= 2016 in the United Kingdom =

Events from the year 2016 in the United Kingdom. The year was dominated by the UK's vote to leave the European Union and the subsequent political fallout.

== Incumbents ==
- Monarch – Elizabeth II
- Prime Minister
  - David Cameron (Conservative) (until 13 July)
  - Theresa May (Conservative) (starting 13 July)

== Events ==
=== January ===
- 4 January – As strong winds and heavy rain continue to batter parts of Scotland, more than 30 flood warnings are issued by SEPA.
- 6 January – Labour MPs Jonathan Reynolds and Stephen Doughty resign from the shadow cabinet over the sacking of the shadow Europe minister Pat McFadden, after party leader Jeremy Corbyn reshuffles his shadow cabinet and makes controversial changes within his team.

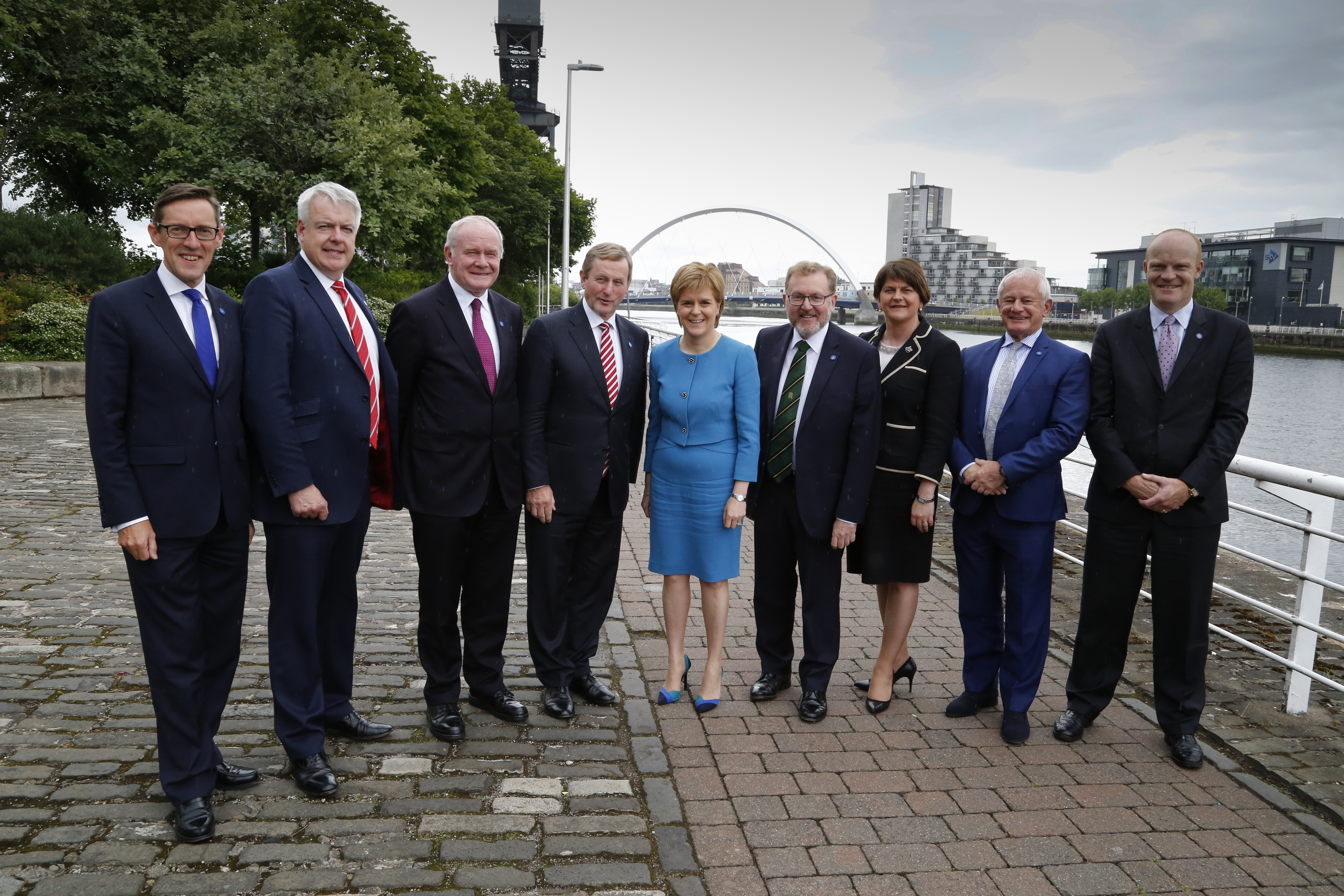
Arlene Foster, newly appointed First minister of Northern Ireland, pictured (third from right) later in 2016 with representatives of various Sovereign, devolved and dependant governments of the islands at the British and Irish Council in Glasgow

- 11 January
  - In the aftermath of Jeremy Corbyn's reshuffle of the Labour Party, Shadow Attorney General Catherine McKinnell resigns, citing party infighting, family reasons and the desire to speak in Parliament beyond her legal portfolio.
  - Arlene Foster becomes the first woman to lead the Democratic Unionist Party and becomes Northern Ireland's first female First Minister.
- 12 January – Junior doctors in England providing non-emergency care strike for 24 hours in a dispute with Health Secretary Jeremy Hunt over pay and working hours.
- 14 January
  - The gang of "brazen burglars" involved in the £14m Hatton Garden jewellery heist, dubbed the "largest burglary in English legal history", face jail after the final three are convicted of involvement.
  - The Metropolitan Police announce that an extra 600 armed officers are to be trained and patrols more than doubled to help counter the threat of a terrorist attack in London.
- 15 January – Tim Peake conducts the first spacewalk by an "official" British astronaut, stepping outside an ISS airlock.
- 20 January – Unemployment rates fall to 5.1%, their lowest level in almost a decade, but figures show that wage growth has slowed.
- 21 January
  - An inquiry finds that the murder of British ex-Russian spy Alexander Litvinenko in 2006 in London was "probably" approved by Russian president Vladimir Putin.
  - Figures show that murders and killings in England and Wales have increased to their highest level for five years, largely due to an abnormally high number of deaths in June when 75 people were killed.
- 28 January – After three weeks of appeals, Camelot receive a "valid claim" for the record breaking £33m Lotto jackpot prize drawn on 9 January.
- 29 January – The last Land Rover Defender rolls off the production line at Solihull, ending 68 years of production.

=== February ===
- 1 February – Scientists are given the go-ahead by regulators to genetically modify human embryos which are to be destroyed in seven days.
- 3 February – The High Court gives permission for Lord Lucan to be declared dead, and for a death certificate to be issued 42 years after his disappearance.
- 8 February – Storm Imogen hits the United Kingdom, causing thousands of power outages and structural damage across the country, along with disruption for many commuters.
- 10 February – Junior doctors walk out in their second recent strike over Saturday working arrangements, causing disruption to medical services.
- 12 February – After many years as print newspapers, it is announced that the UK newspapers The Independent and the Independent on Sunday will cease to print and become online-only at the end of March. Its stablemate, the i, will be sold to Johnston Press.
- 16 February – BBC Three becomes the first UK television network to become online only, having broadcast for its final night after 13 years as a television channel.
- 18 February – R v Jogee, which reverses previous case law on criminal joint enterprise, is decided in the Supreme Court.
- 20 February – David Cameron announces that the UK will hold a referendum on its membership of the European Union on 23 June.
- 21 February – Mayor of London Boris Johnson announces he is to campaign for the UK to leave the European Union.
- 22 February – The pound hits its lowest level against the dollar, falling down as much as 2.4%, in almost seven years amid concerns about a possible exit from the European Union.

=== March ===
- 7 March – Official tourist figures for 2015 show the British Museum remains the most popular attraction in the United Kingdom.
- 9 March
  - Four of the gang of "brazen burglars" involved in the Hatton Garden jewellery heist are sentenced to seven years' imprisonment, while a fifth is given six years.
  - Junior doctors strike for the third time over new contracts, with NHS England saying that more than 5,000 operations have been cancelled as a result.
- 16 March – Chancellor George Osborne announces the Budget for 2016 and the year ahead.
- 18 March – Iain Duncan Smith resigns as Secretary of State for Work and Pensions claiming that he came under pressure from the Treasury to "salami slice" welfare, and voicing his objection to £4bn of planned cuts to disability benefits announced in the Budget. Duncan Smith is succeeded in the post by Stephen Crabb.
- 19 March – England win the Six Nations Grand Slam (rugby union) — their first since 2003.
- 21 March – Brian Reader, the ringleader in the Hatton Garden jewellery heist, and the last of the gang to be sentenced, is given more than six years in jail.
- 22 March – Transgender fell-runner Lauren Jeska attempts to murder UK Athletics official Ralph Knibbs, stabbing him multiple times in Birmingham. Jeska had feared her records and ability to compete in women's events would be investigated due to the unfair advantage she had from being born male.
- 23 March – Drivers on London Underground's Piccadilly line go on strike for 24 hours over bullying allegations.
- 28 March – Storm Katie rips through parts of the United Kingdom through the Easter weekend and many parts of the country suffer damage. The storm causes disruption with many flights cancelled or diverted as a result.
- 30 March – British steel maker Tata Steel reports that it will sell off its British operations in a move to save money, leaving many thousands of jobs at risk, including those at the large Port Talbot steelworks in Wales.
- 31 March
  - Prime Minister David Cameron cuts short his spring break to return to the UK for an emergency meeting with ministers on the planned closure of the Tata Steel works.
  - This Morning agony aunt Denise Robertson dies aged 83 after a short battle with pancreatic cancer having been diagnosed in early 2016.
  - Ferrybridge Power Station in West Yorkshire closes after 50 years of electricity generation to make way for a greener future after major fire destroyed part of the plant on 31 July 2014.

=== April ===
- 1 April – A new National Living Wage comes into force in the United Kingdom, requiring employers to pay all workers over 25 years old at least £7.20 per hour.
- 6 April – The 2016 Dog Microchipping Legislation comes into force, requiring every dog in England, Scotland and Wales to be micro-chipped if they are over eight weeks old. The law was already introduced in Northern Ireland in 2012.
- 7 April – A junior doctors' strike over pay disputes enters its second day, with over 5,000 operations and procedures being postponed.
- 10 April – English golfer Danny Willett wins the 2016 Masters Tournament, the first time a Briton has won the tournament since Nick Faldo in 1996.
- 13 April – Stoke Gifford Parish Council in Gloucestershire votes to charge the weekly Little Stoke Parkrun event for use of its park, becoming the first in the UK to do so. The move is widely condemned.
- 14 April – In the final report following the August 2015 Shoreham Airshow crash, the Civil Aviation Authority tightens the rules of all future airshows over safety fears.
- 15 April – The European Union membership referendum campaign gets underway in the UK as both sides prepare to persuade voters to decide whether they want to leave or remain in the EU when the referendum takes place in June.
- 16 April – Thousands of people take part in central London in a protest against austerity cuts, including the Shadow Chancellor, John McDonnell.
- 21 April
  - Welsh footballer Ched Evans has his 2012 conviction for rape quashed by the Court of Appeal. Evans has been wrongly imprisoned for two and half years; a retrial is ordered to take place in October.
  - Queen Elizabeth II marks her 90th birthday.
- 26 April
  - A jury at a coroner's court in Warrington declares that the victims of the Hillsborough disaster of 1989 were unlawfully killed.
  - Junior doctors go on strike again, this time including those providing emergency care for the first time.

=== May ===
- 2 May – Leicester City win the Premier League for the first time, having been quoted odds as long as 5000/1 before the start of the season.
- 3 May – Thousands of parents take their children out of school for a day in opposition to the introduction of SAT exams for Year 2 pupils.
- 5 May – UK local and Police and crime commissioner elections, as well as elections to the Northern Ireland Assembly, Welsh Assembly and Scottish Parliament are held.
- 7 May – Sadiq Khan is sworn in as mayor of London, succeeding Boris Johnson and becoming London's first Muslim mayor.
- 16 May – The Driver and Vehicle Licensing Agency show a prototype digital driving licence designed to be stored in a digital wallet on a smartphone.
- 18 May – The government's planned new laws are set out by the Queen in her annual speech, which include a large overhaul on prison laws and support for a spaceport and driverless cars.
- 21 May – Manchester United beat Crystal Palace 2–1 after extra time in the FA Cup final at Wembley Stadium in London. It is the 12th time they have won the competition. Two days later, manager Louis van Gaal is sacked, with José Mourinho set to replace him.

=== June ===
- 1 June – Archaeologists announce identification of one of the Roman Bloomberg tablets found during 2010–13 excavations in advance of construction of new Bloomberg London offices in the City of London as the oldest known hand-written document in the United Kingdom, dating back to AD 57.
- 12 June – UEFA threatens to disqualify England from Euro 2016 after "totally unacceptable" violent hooliganism between England and Russia fans during an England-Russia game on 11 June.
- 16 June – Labour MP Jo Cox dies at Leeds General Infirmary after being shot and stabbed as she prepared to hold a meeting with constituents in Birstall, West Yorkshire.
- 21 June – Both sides of the referendum on the UK's membership of the European Union take part in the biggest live debate at Wembley Arena on a special edition of Question Time on the BBC. Panelists include former mayor of London Boris Johnson, for Leave, and his successor Sadiq Khan for Remain.
  Ballot for the EU referendum
- 23 June – The 2016 United Kingdom European Union membership referendum is held in the UK and Gibraltar, the first of its kind since the 1975 referendum on the UK's membership of the then European Economic Community.
- 24 June
  - The United Kingdom votes to leave the European Union in a vote of 51.9% to 48.1%, in a record voting turnout of 72%.
  - David Cameron resigns as leader of the Conservative Party, announcing he is to step down as Prime Minister by October, claiming "fresh leadership" is needed in the wake of a vote to leave. The 2016 Conservative Party leadership election is launched to find his successor.
  - London's stock market plunges more than 8% in the wake of the EU referendum result, with the pound falling to its lowest level against the dollar since 1985.
- 26 June
  - Several Labour Party shadow cabinet ministers resign from their positions, with many more expected, in protest at Jeremy Corbyn's leadership and "lacklustre" referendum campaign. Corbyn issues a statement in response, vowing to stand in any new leadership election and to reshape his shadow cabinet.
  - First Minister of Scotland Nicola Sturgeon warns she could persuade the Scottish Parliament to veto the United Kingdom's exit from the European Union.
- 27 June
  - Chancellor of the Exchequer George Osborne makes a statement to calm the markets, claiming the UK is ready to face the future "from a position of strength" and indicating there won't be an immediate emergency Budget.
  - Ratings agency Standard & Poor's state the referendum result could lead to "a deterioration of the UK's economic performance, including its large financial services sector" as the United Kingdom loses its top AAA credit rating.
  - England are knocked out of UEFA Euro 2016 after a shock 2–1 defeat to Iceland in the round of 16. England manager Roy Hodgson resigns in the wake of the result.
- 28 June
  - A motion of no confidence by Labour MPs in leader Jeremy Corbyn is passed by a 172 to 40 vote. However, Corbyn reiterates that he will not resign.
  - Stephen Crabb becomes the first MP to announce their candidacy in the 2016 Conservative Party leadership election.
- 30 June – Michael Gove, Theresa May, Andrea Leadsom and Liam Fox announce their candidacies for leadership of the Conservative Party and subsequently Prime Minister. Boris Johnson, a front runner for the job according to political analysts, surprisingly declares his intentions not to campaign.

=== July ===
- 1 July
  - A two-minute silence is observed at 7.28 a.m. throughout the United Kingdom to commemorate the centenary of the Battle of the Somme. The art event We're Here Because We're Here is staged across the U.K. by Jeremy Deller to mark the same event.
  - Wales qualify for the semi-final of Euro 2016 after beating Belgium 3–1, the team's most significant victory since 1958.
- 4 July – UK Independence Party leader Nigel Farage resigns, saying his "political ambition had been achieved" with the UK voting to leave the European Union.
- 6 July – The Chilcot Inquiry report into the Iraq War is released, more than seven years after the inquiry was first announced, showing that the UK went to war before peaceful options were exhausted, that military action was not the "last resort", ill-prepared troops were sent into battle with inadequate plans for the aftermath, and that the threat from Saddam Hussein was overstated; ultimately rejecting former prime minister Tony Blair's case for the 2003 invasion.
- 8 July – Women are now permitted to serve in close combat roles in the British armed services.
- 10 July
  - Angela Eagle announces she will challenge Jeremy Corbyn for leadership of the Labour Party, triggering a leadership election.
  - Andy Murray defeats Milos Raonic of Canada in straight sets for his second men's Singles title at Wimbledon 2016. Murray becomes the first British man since Fred Perry in 1935 to win the Wimbledon Championships multiple times.
- 11 July – Theresa May is announced as the Conservative Party leader, and Prime Minister-designate, after Andrea Leadsom withdraws from the leadership election.
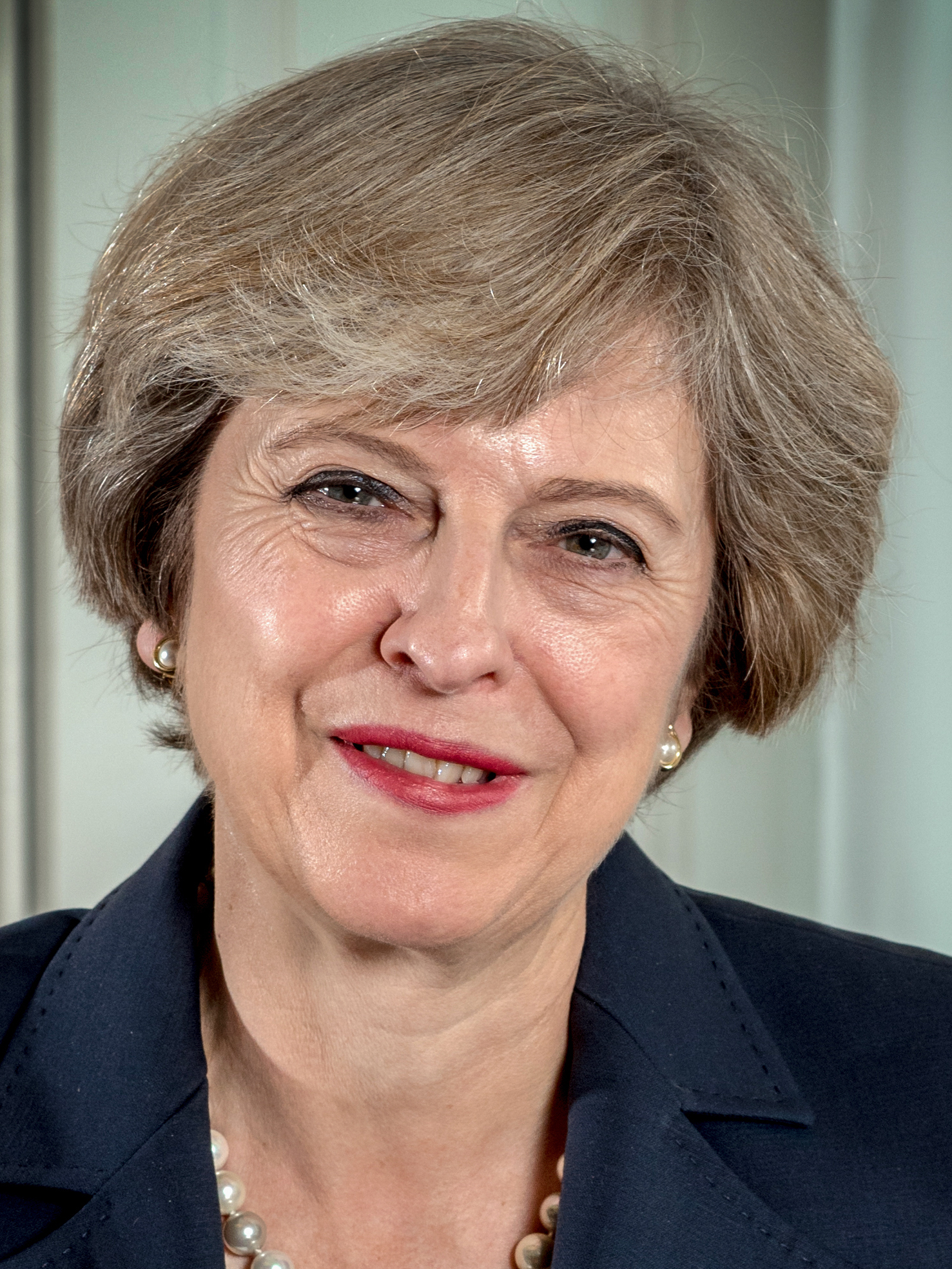
  New Prime Minister and Conservative leader Theresa May
- 13 July
  - David Cameron officially tenders his resignation as Prime Minister to the Queen, and is succeeded by his former Home Secretary Theresa May.
  - Theresa May begins to announce her cabinet, with Philip Hammond as the new chancellor of the exchequer, Amber Rudd as Home Secretary, Boris Johnson as Foreign Secretary, and David Davis appointed in the new Exiting the European Union Secretary post.
  - Owen Smith announces he will also contest the 2016 Labour Party leadership election.
- 18 July – MPs vote to back the renewal of the UK's Trident nuclear weapons programme, in a vote of 472 to 117.
- 19 July – Angela Eagle withdraws from the 2016 Labour Party leadership election, leaving Owen Smith to challenge Jeremy Corbyn for the leadership in a head-to-head race.
- 24 July – Chris Froome wins the Tour de France for the second year running and third time overall. Froome's victory means that a British rider has won four of the last five editions of the race.
- 28 July – EDF approves investment in the first new nuclear power plant to be built in the UK in 20 years at Hinkley Point, Somerset; however, the government delay a final decision, calling for it to be reviewed by the autumn.

=== August ===
- 1 August – Permission is given to enlarge the Yorkshire Dales and Lake District National Parks in northern England.
- 4 August – The Bank of England cuts interest rates from 0.5% to 0.25% – a record low and the first cut since 2009.
- 8 August – A five-day strike by workers on Southern Rail begins, disrupting train services between London, Surrey and Sussex, the longest rail strike in the United Kingdom since 1968.
- 12 August – Mumin Sahin and Emin Ozmen are jailed for a total of 42 years for their part in the UK's largest ever drugs haul, in which 3.2 tonnes of cocaine worth £512 million was seized from a vessel in the North Sea.
- 16 August
  - The radical Islamic cleric Anjem Choudary and his assistant Mohammed Mizahnur Rahman are found guilty at the Old Bailey of inviting support for a proscribed terrorist organisation, Islamic State.
  - The world's largest ever wind farm, consisting of 300 turbines producing 1.8 gigawatts of clean energy, is approved for construction off the Yorkshire coast.
- 17 August – The Airlander 10 hybrid airship, the world's largest aircraft at 92 m (302 ft) in length and 38,000 m^{3} (1,300,000 cu ft) in volume, has its maiden civilian flight in Bedfordshire.
- 21 August – Team GB finish competing at the 2016 Summer Olympics in Rio de Janeiro, Brazil. They finish second in the medal table, with 27 golds, 23 silvers, and 17 bronze medals; their best Olympic result in over a century.

=== September ===
- 1 September – The Francis Crick Institute, Europe's largest biomedical research facility, opens in London.
- 2 September – Nicholas Chamberlain, the Bishop of Grantham, becomes the first Church of England bishop to declare openly that he is gay and in a relationship.
- 12 September – Former prime minister David Cameron resigns from the House of Commons, triggering the 2016 Witney by-election.
- 13 September
  - The first Bank of England polymer banknote enters circulation. (Northern Bank in Northern Ireland had previously issued a polymer £5 note, but that was not legal tender in the rest of the UK).
  - The UK experiences its hottest September day since 1911, with 34.4 °C recorded in Gravesend, Kent.
- 15 September – The government approves the Hinkley Point C nuclear power plant, which will cost £18bn, and says it will introduce "new safeguards" to future projects.
- 16 September
  - Flash flooding hits parts of England as thunderstorms dump almost half a month's rainfall in some areas overnight.
  - Diane James is elected the new leader of UKIP.
- 24 September – Jeremy Corbyn is re-elected as leader of the Labour Party following an unsuccessful challenge by Owen Smith.

=== October ===
- 5 October – Diane James resigns as leader of UKIP after only 18 days in the post.
- 6 October – Communities Secretary Sajid Javid approves plans for fracking at Cuadrilla's Preston New Road site in Lancashire, overturning an earlier decision by the local council.
- 12 October – Welsh footballer Ched Evans is cleared of rape in a retrial, having previously been wrongfully convicted for the offence, serving two and half years in prison.
- 25 October – The government approves a third runway at Heathrow Airport. Zac Goldsmith, MP for Richmond Park, resigns in protest.

=== November ===
- 2 November – The High Court in London rules in favour of ClientEarth in their case against the government regarding dangerous levels of air pollution in the UK.
- 5 November – The British tennis player Andy Murray becomes ATP world number one, the first British player of either sex to reach number one in tennis rankings in the modern era.
- 9 November – 2016 Croydon tram derailment: Seven people die and 61 are injured when a tram derails close to Sandilands tram stop in Croydon (London).
- 15 November
  - The British Medical Journal backs the legalisation of drugs for the first time, arguing that the "war on drugs" has failed.
  - The second phase of the high-speed rail line HS2 is confirmed by the government, with lines running from Crewe to Manchester and the West Midlands to Leeds.
- 17 November – Tornadoes affect parts of The Midlands and Wales, causing some damage.
- 23 November
  - Chancellor Philip Hammond delivers the Autumn Statement to Parliament, announced to be the final such Statement, being replaced by a full Budget in 2017.
  - Thomas Mair is found guilty of the murder of Jo Cox, who was serving as Member of Parliament (MP) for Batley and Spen at the time of her death. He is sentenced to life imprisonment with a whole life order and Justice Wilkie says Mair's actions "betrayed the quintessence of our country".
- 25 November – Stephen Port is sentenced to life imprisonment with a whole life order for four murders committed between June 2014 and September 2015.
- 28 November – Paul Nuttall is elected as UKIP's new leader.
- 29 November –The Investigatory Powers Bill receives Royal assent.

=== December ===
- 7 December – HMS Illustrious, the last Invincible-class aircraft carrier, makes its final voyage out of Portsmouth Harbour to a ship recycling company in Turkey.
- 16 December – A riot occurs at HMP Birmingham, described as the worst since the Strangeways prison riot and protest of 1990. Authorities regain control of all four wings after more than 12 hours of disorder involving 600 inmates.

=== Undated ===
- London based cloud-computing company Carrenza is acquired by Six Degrees.

== Publications ==
- Steve Cole's Heads You Die, the second novel in the Young Bond series.
- David Stuart Davies' novel The Ripper Legacy.
- Lindsey Davis' crime novel The Graveyard of the Hesperides.
- Owen Hatherley's The Ministry of Nostalgia.
- Deborah Levy's novel Hot Milk.
- Stuart MacBride's novel In the Cold Dark Ground.
- China Miéville's fantasy novella This Census-Taker.
- Tony Norfield's The City: London and the Global Power of Finance.
- Beatrix Potter's children's story The Tale of Kitty-in-Boots, discovered after 100 years.
- Terry Pratchett and Stephen Baxter's novel The Long Cosmos.
- Rosa Prince's Comrade Corbyn, the biography of Labour leader Jeremy Corbyn.
- Kate Saunders, Brian Sibley, Jeanne Willis and Paul Bright's collection The Best Bear in All the World, an authorised Winnie-the-Pooh sequel (from Egmont Publishing).

== Deaths ==
=== January ===
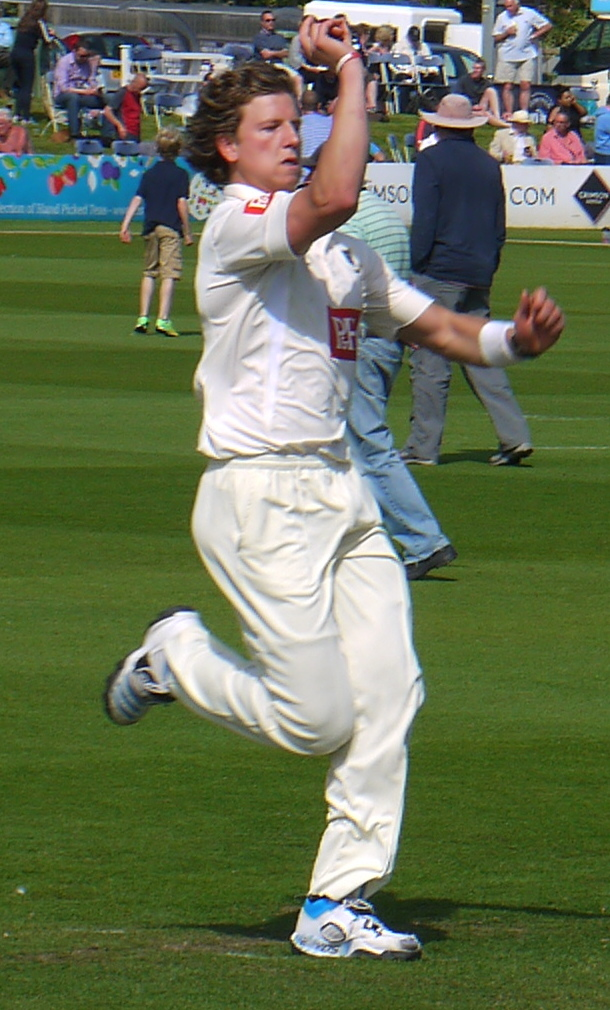
Matt Hobden (1993–2016)

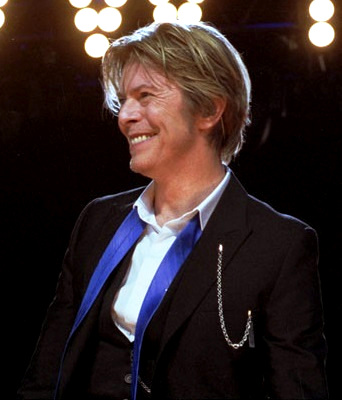
David Bowie (1947–2016) in 2002

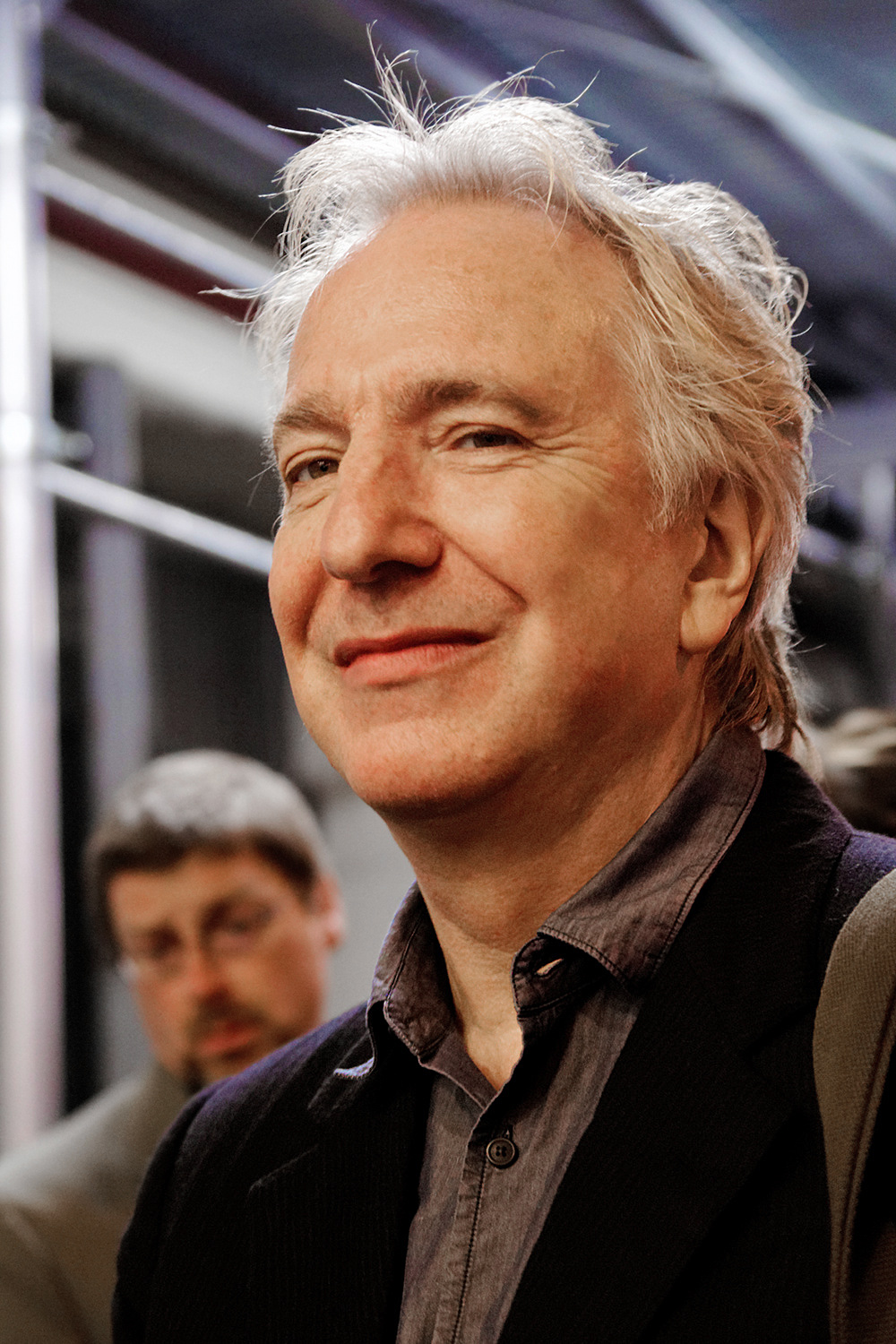
Alan Rickman (1946–2016), acclaimed stage and screen actor, in 2011

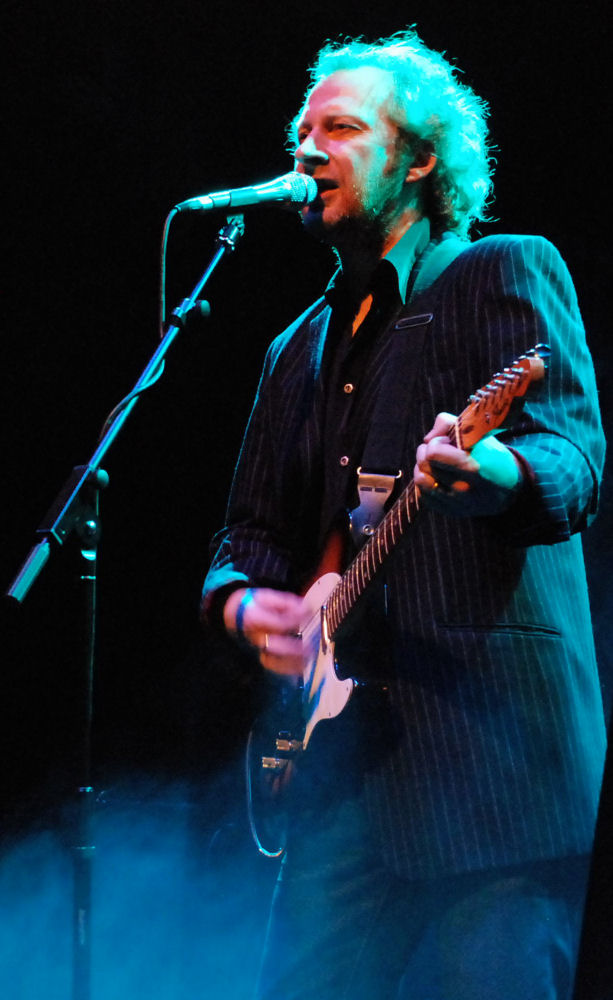
Black (1962–2016)

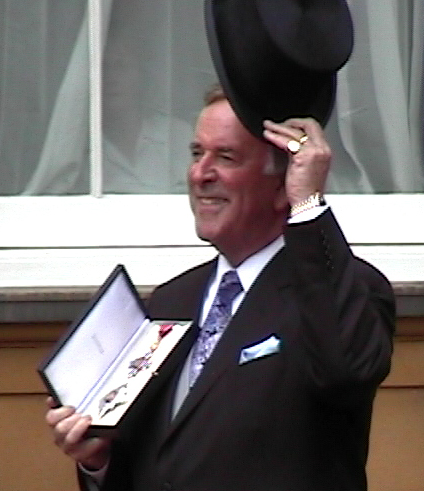
Sir Terry Wogan (1938–2016) at his investiture in 2005

- 1 January – Mark B, 45, hip-hop record producer.
- 2 January
  - Matt Hobden, 22, cricketer (Sussex).
  - Thomas Johnstone McWiggan, 97, aviation engineer.
  - Leonard White, 99, television producer and actor.
- 3 January
  - Olwyn Hughes, 87, literary agent (Ted Hughes).
  - Peter Powell, 83, kite maker.
  - Tommy Sale, 97, rugby league player (Leigh, Widnes).
- 4 January
  - Tom Allin, 28, cricket player (Warwickshire).
  - Robert Balser, 88, animator (Yellow Submarine, Heavy Metal, The Jackson 5ive).
  - Colin Butler, 102, entomologist.
  - John Roberts, 69, footballer (Arsenal, Birmingham, Wrexham).
  - Robert Stigwood, 81, band manager (Bee Gees, Cream) and film producer (Grease, Saturday Night Fever, Evita).
- 5 January
  - Sian Blake, 43, actress (EastEnders) (body discovered).
  - Percy Freeman, 70, footballer (Lincoln City, West Bromwich Albion, Reading).
  - Albert Gubay, 87, businessman (Kwik Save).
- 7 January
  - Paddy Doherty, 89, Irish civil rights activist.
  - Alan Haven, 80, jazz organist.
  - Sir Christopher Wallace, 73, army general, Commandant Royal College of Defence Studies (2001–2005)
- 8 January – Ida Gaskin, 96, teacher and quiz show contestant.
- 9 January
  - Ed Stewart, 74, radio presenter.
  - Gareth Hoskins, 48, architect.
  - Mike McGinnity, football chairman (Coventry City).
- 10 January
  - David Bowie, 69, singer-songwriter ("Space Oddity", Ziggy Stardust, Station to Station), record producer and actor (Labyrinth).
  - Anthony Mellows, 79, barrister and academic, Lord Prior of the Order of St John (2008–2014).
  - John Stokes, 70, soldier and mountaineer.
- 11 January
  - Elizabeth Aston, 67, author.
  - Sir Kenneth Corfield, 91, camera engineer, inventor of the Corfield Periflex.
  - John Easter, 70, squash player and cricketer.
- 12 January
  - Robert Black, 68, serial killer and kidnapper.
  - Tommy Mulgrew, 86, footballer (Southampton).
  - John Stevens, 86, journalist.
- 13 January
  - Brian Bedford, 80, actor (Robin Hood, Nixon, Much Ado About Nothing).
  - Sir Albert McQuarrie, 98, Scottish politician, MP for East Aberdeenshire (1979–1983) and Banff and Buchan (1983–1987).
  - Conrad Phillips, 90, television and film actor (The Adventures of William Tell).
  - Mike Salmon, 82, racing driver.
- 14 January
  - Glyn W. Humphreys, 61, neuropsychologist.
  - Alan Rickman, 69, actor (Harry Potter, Die Hard, Love Actually).
  - Robert Banks Stewart, 84, television writer (Doctor Who, Bergerac, Shoestring).
- 15 January
  - Robin Fletcher, 93, academic administrator and Olympic field hockey player.
  - Charles Harbord-Hamond, 12th Baron Suffield, 62, nobleman.
- 17 January
  - Dale Griffin, 67, drummer (Mott the Hoople).
  - Delphine Parrott, 87, immunologist.
  - Angus Ross, 49, darts player.
- 18 January
  - Terence Cook, 88, rugby union and rugby league footballer.
  - Andy Dog Johnson, 57, artist, designer of The The record sleeves.
  - Mike MacDowel, 83, racing driver.
- 19 January
  - Robert M. Carter, 73, marine geologist and climate skeptic.
  - Laurence Lerner, 90, literary critic.
  - Sheila Sim, Lady Attenborough, 93, actress (A Canterbury Tale, Pandora and the Flying Dutchman, West of Zanzibar).
- 20 January
  - Stuart Cowden, 90, footballer (Stoke City).
  - Brian Key, 68, politician, MEP for Yorkshire South (1979–1984).
  - George Weidenfeld, Baron Weidenfeld, 96, publisher, philanthropist, and newspaper columnist.
- 21 January
  - Michael Sheringham, literary academic, Marshal Foch Professor of French Literature at Oxford University (2004–2015).
  - Gerald Williams, 86, tennis commentator.
- 22 January
  - Jack Bannister, 85, cricket player (Warwickshire) and commentator.
  - Tommy Bryceland, 76, footballer (St Mirren, Norwich, Oldham Athletic).
  - John Dowie, 60, footballer (Fulham, Celtic).
  - Ian Murray, 83, Roman Catholic prelate, Bishop of Argyll and the Isles (1999–2008).
  - Denise Newman, 91, Olympic diver (1948).
  - Cecil Parkinson, Lord Parkinson, 84, Conservative politician and cabinet minister, Secretary of State for Trade and Industry (1983), Energy (1987–1989), and Transport (1989–1990), and Chairman of the Conservative Party (1997–1998).
  - Anthony Simmons, 93, screenwriter and film director (The Optimists of Nine Elms, Black Joy).
  - Alec Wishart, 76, musician (Hogsnort Rupert).
- 23 January
  - Jimmy Bain, 68, bassist (Rainbow, Dio).
  - Grahame Hodgson, 79, rugby union player (Wales).
- 24 January
  - Christine Jackson, 53, cellist
  - Eric Webster, 84, footballer (Manchester City) and football manager (Stockport County).
  - Henry Worsley, 55, adventurer.
- 26 January
  - Black, 53, singer-songwriter ("Wonderful Life").
  - Ray Pointer, 79, footballer (Burnley, Coventry City, Portsmouth).
- 27 January
  - Peter Baker, 84, footballer (Tottenham Hotspur).
  - Bernard Cookson, 79, cartoonist.
  - John F. G. Howe, 85, air marshal.
- 28 January
  - Tommy O'Hara, 62, footballer (Queen of the South, Washington Diplomats, Motherwell).
  - Nigel Peel, 48, cricketer (Cheshire).
  - Nadine Senior, 76, English dance teacher.
  - Dave Thomson, 77, footballer (Dunfermline Athletic).
- 29 January
  - Gordon Goody, 86, criminal, mastermind of the Great Train Robbery.
  - John Roper, Baron Roper, 80, politician.
  - Donald I. Williamson, 94, biologist.
- 30 January
  - Tony Beard, 79, radio announcer (BBC Radio Devon).
  - Frank Finlay, 89, actor (Othello, The Pianist, The Three Musketeers).
- 31 January
  - Gillian Avery, 89, children's novelist and historian.
  - Sir Terry Wogan, 77, broadcaster (Wogan, Children in Need, Blankety Blank, Come Dancing) and BBC presenter of the Eurovision Song Contest (1971–2008).

=== February ===
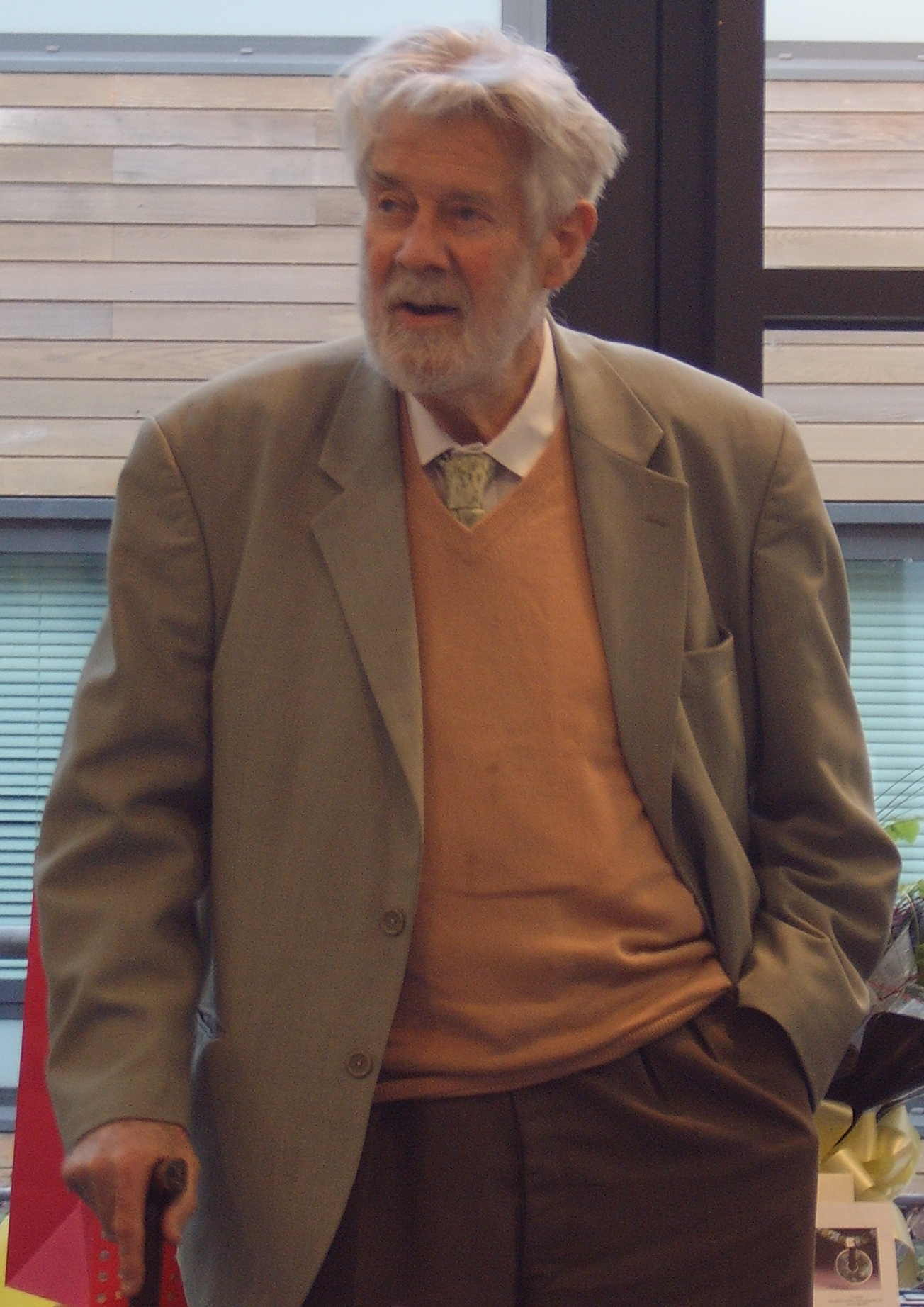
Sir Christopher Zeeman (1925–2016) in 2009

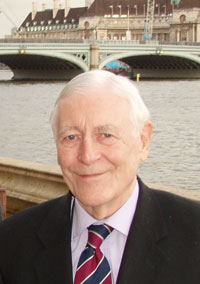
Eric Lubbock, 4th Baron Avebury (1928–2016) in 2006

- 1 February
  - Francis Ormsby-Gore, 6th Baron Harlech, 61, nobleman.
  - Tom Pugh, 78, cricketer.
  - Sir Peter Whiteley, 95, General in the Royal Marines, Lieutenant Governor of Jersey (1979–1984).
- 2 February – Seth Cardew, 81, studio potter.
- 4 February
  - William Gaskill, 85, theatre director.
  - Harry Glasgow, 76, footballer (Clyde).
  - Harry Harpham, 61, politician, MP for Sheffield Brightside and Hillsborough (since 2015).
  - Sir Jeremy Morse, 87, banker and crossword compiler.
  - David Sloan, 74, footballer (Scunthorpe United, Oxford United, Walsall).
- 6 February
  - Alastair Biggar, 69, rugby union player (Scotland, British and Irish Lions, London Scottish).
- 8 February
  - John Disley, 87, steeplechase runner, Olympic bronze medallist (1952), and co-founder of the London Marathon.
  - Margaret Forster, 77, novelist (Georgy Girl) and biographer.
  - Norman Hudis, 93, screenwriter (Carry On).
- 9 February
  - Wayne England, artist (Magic: The Gathering).
  - Michael Hanlon, 51, science journalist.
  - Roy Harris, 82, folk singer.
  - Graham Moore, 74, footballer (Charlton Athletic, Cardiff City).
- 10 February
  - Ian Cowap, 65, cricketer (Cheshire).
  - Phil Gartside, 63, businessman and football chairman (Bolton Wanderers).
- 11 February
  - Les Belshaw, 88, rugby league footballer of the 1950s
  - Sir Timothy Bevan, 88, banker, chairman of Barclays (1981–1987).
  - Peter Wood, 90, theatre director.
- 12 February
  - Barbara Hardy, 92, author.
  - Keith Jeffery, 64, historian.
- 13 February
  - Flakey Dove, 30, racehorse, winner of the 1994 Champion Hurdle.
  - Sir Christopher Zeeman, 91, mathematician.
  - Members of the band Viola Beach killed in a car accident:
    - Jack Dakin, 19, drummer.
    - Kris Leonard, 20, singer and guitarist.
    - Tomas Lowe, 27, bassist.
    - River Reeves, 19, guitarist.
    - Craig Tarry, 32, manager.
- 14 February
  - Ali Brownlee, 56, radio sports broadcaster (Middlesbrough F.C. on BBC Tees).
  - Drewe Henley, 75, actor (Star Wars).
  - David Hey, 77, historian.
  - Eric Lubbock, 4th Baron Avebury, 87, politician, MP for Orpington (1962–1970).
- 15 February – Walter McGowan, 73, boxer, world champion (1966).
- 16 February
  - Ronnie Blackman, 90, footballer (Reading).
  - Gwyneth George, 95, concert cellist and music academic.
  - Jim Pleass, 92, cricketer (Glamorgan).
- 18 February
  - Sir Tony Durant, 88, politician, MP (1974–1997).
  - Brendan Healy, 59, actor and musician.
  - Bruce Lacey, 89, artist and actor.
  - Johnny Miller, 65, footballer (Ipswich Town).
  - Don Rossiter, 80, footballer and politician.
- 19 February
  - Freddie Goodwin, 82, football player (Manchester United, Leeds United) and manager (Birmingham City).
  - Sir Anthony Hidden, 79, judge.
  - Sir William O'Brien, 99, admiral, Naval Secretary (1964–1966).
  - Vi Subversa, 80, musician (Poison Girls).
- 20 February – Jon Rollason, 84, actor (The Avengers,Coronation Street, Doctor Who).
- 21 February
  - Eric Brown, 97, test pilot.
  - Roger Chorley, 2nd Baron Chorley, 85, nobleman.
  - Vlasta Dalibor, 94, puppeteer (Pinky and Perky).
  - David Duffield, 84, sports commentator and cyclist.
  - Andrew Herxheimer, 90, physician and clinical pharmacologist.
  - Peter Marlow, 63, news photographer.
- 22 February – Douglas Slocombe, 103, cinematographer (Indiana Jones, The Lion in Winter, Jesus Christ Superstar).
- 24 February
  - Jim McFadzean, 77, footballer (Kilmarnock, Heart of Midlothian).
  - S. F. C. Milsom, 92, barrister and legal historian.
- 25 February
  - John Chilton, 83, jazz musician and writer.
  - Jim Clark, 84, film editor (The World Is Not Enough, The Killing Fields, Marathon Man), Oscar winner (1985).
- 26 February
  - Antony Gibbs, 90, film editor (Tom Jones, Fiddler on the Roof, Ronin).
  - Michael S. Longuet-Higgins, 90, mathematician and oceanographer.
- 27 February
  - Michael Bowes-Lyon, 18th Earl of Strathmore and Kinghorne, 58, nobleman and soldier.
  - Dick Bradsell, 56, bartender.
  - Steven Rumbelow, 66, theatre and film director (Autumn).
- 28 February
  - Paul Colinvaux, 85, ecologist and author (Fates of Nations).
  - John Cameron, Lord Coulsfield, 81, judge (Pan Am Flight 103 bombing trial), Senator of the College of Justice (1987–1992).
  - John Jones, 91, author and academic.
- 29 February – Louise Rennison, 64, author (Angus, Thongs and Full-Frontal Snogging).

=== March ===
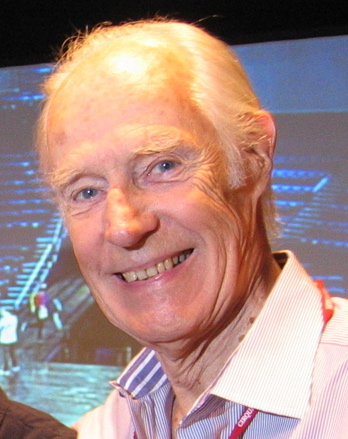
Sir George Martin (1926–2016), often referred to as the "Fifth Beatle", in 2006

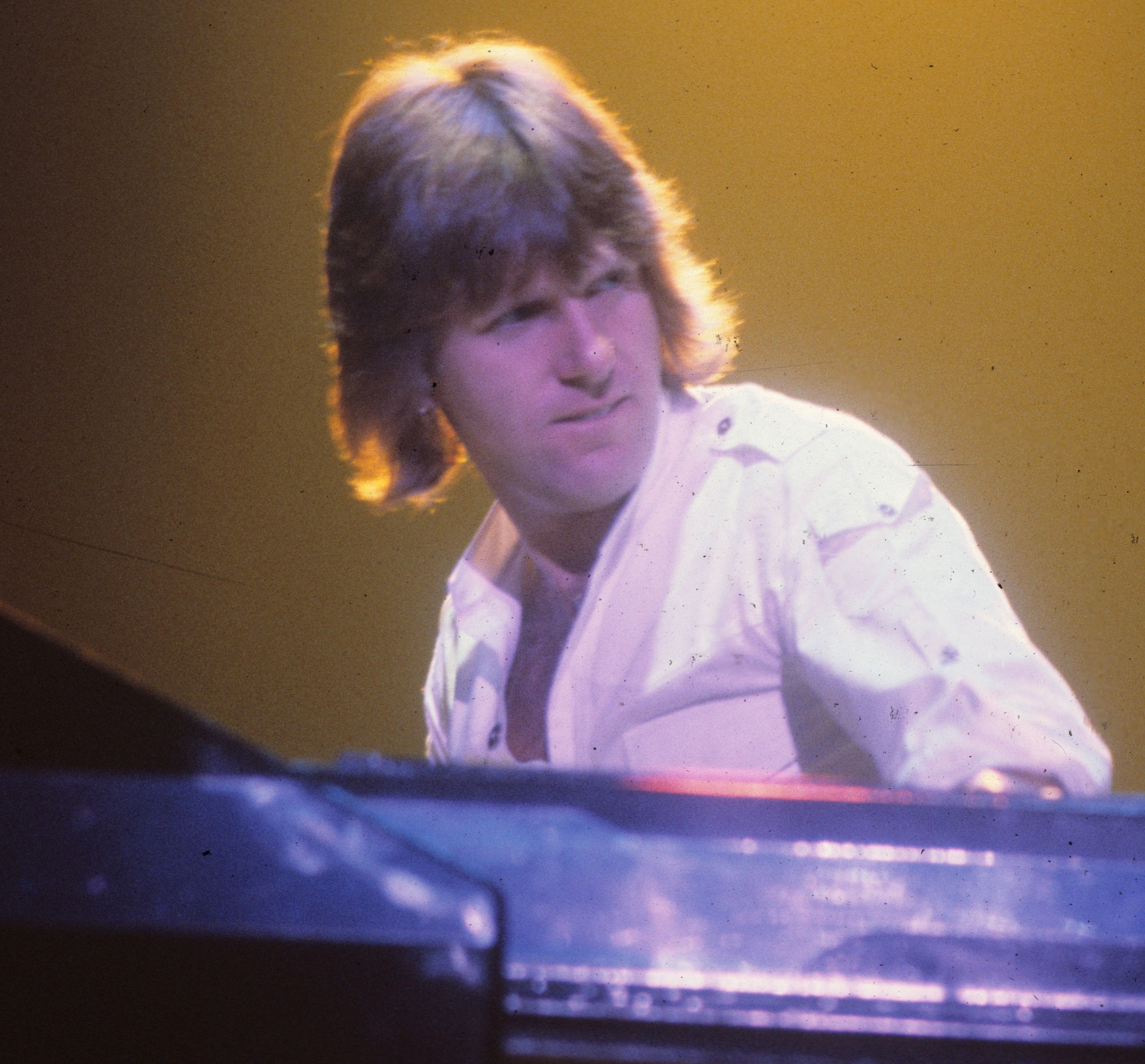
Keith Emerson (1944–2016)

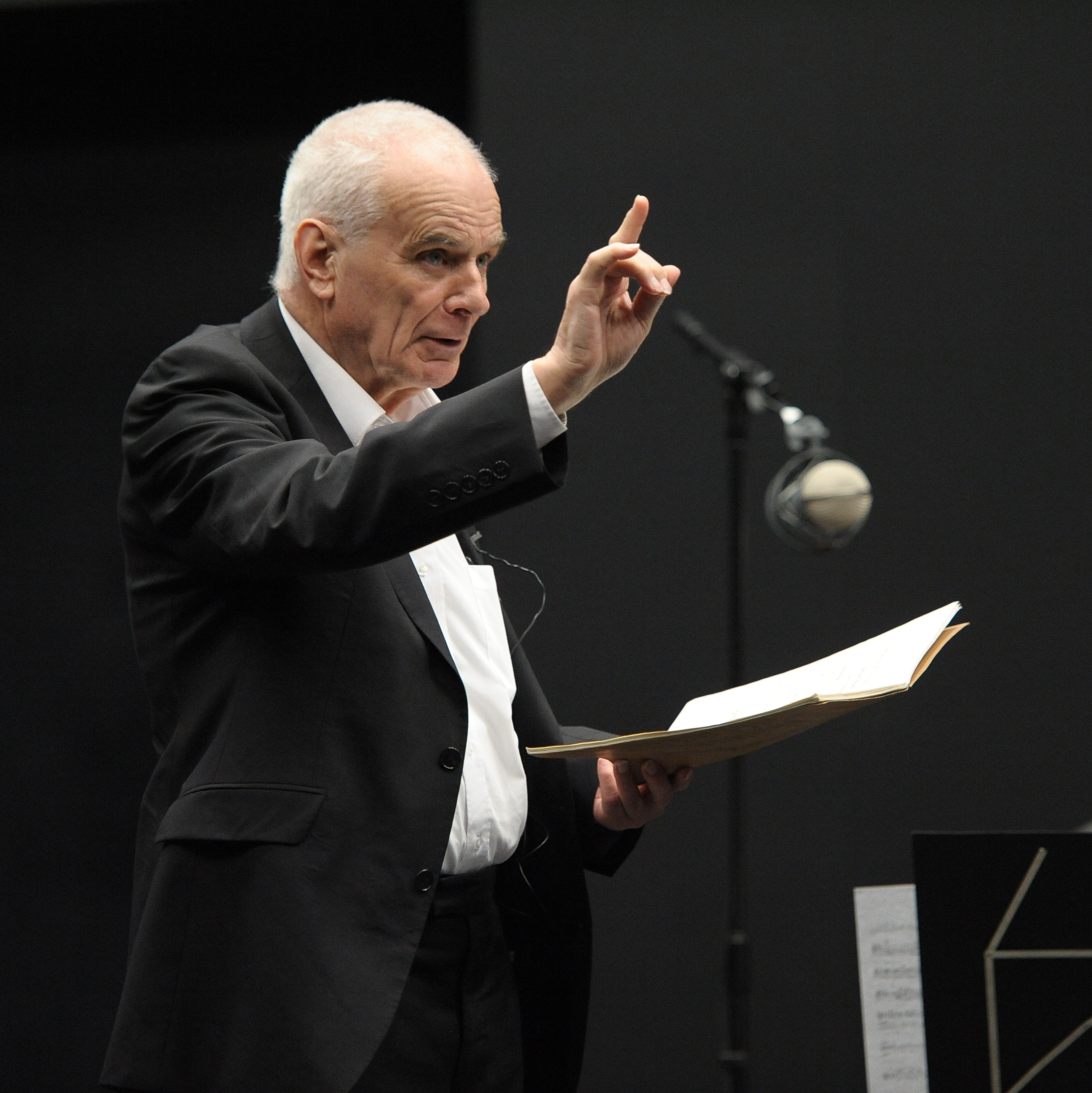
Sir Peter Maxwell Davies (1934–2016) in 2012

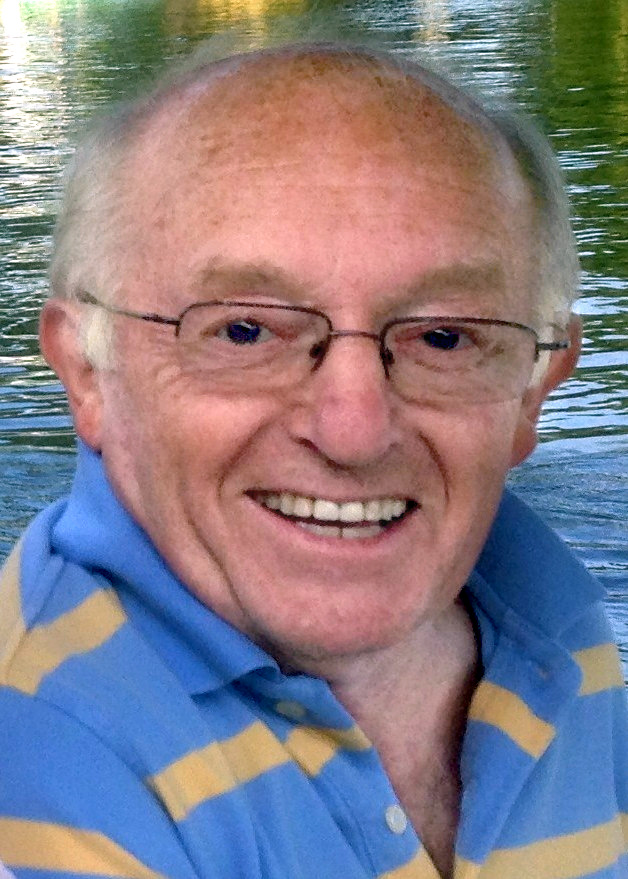
Paul Daniels (1938–2016), a world renowned magician and television performer, in 2013

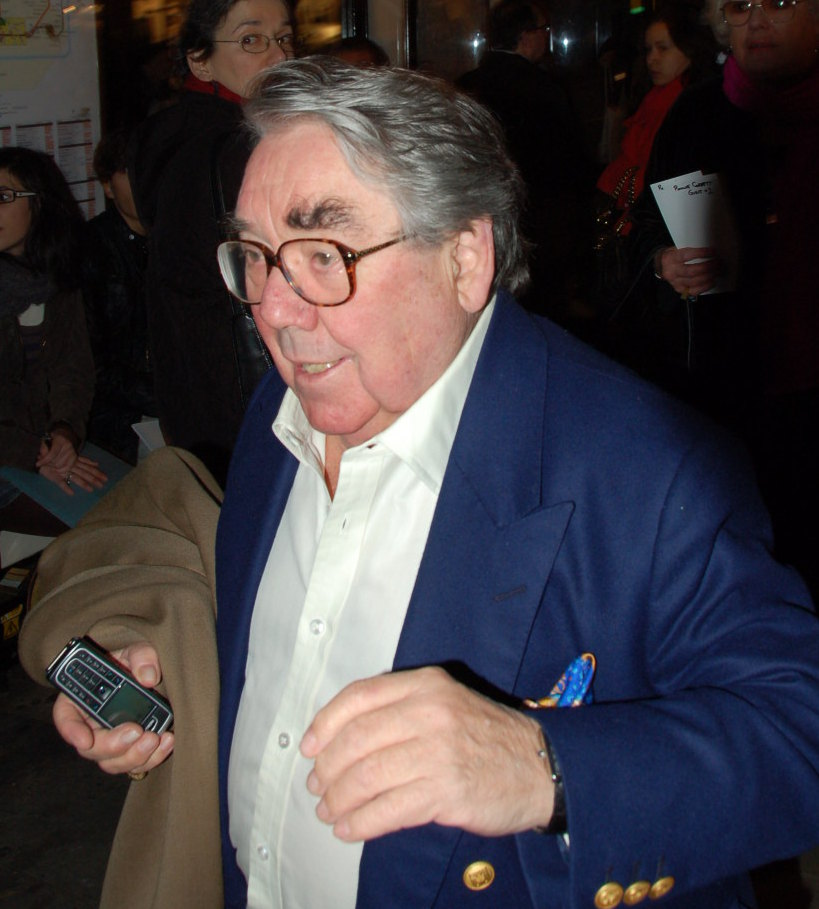
Ronnie Corbett (1930–2016), acclaimed for his work on The Two Ronnies with comedy partner Ronnie Barker

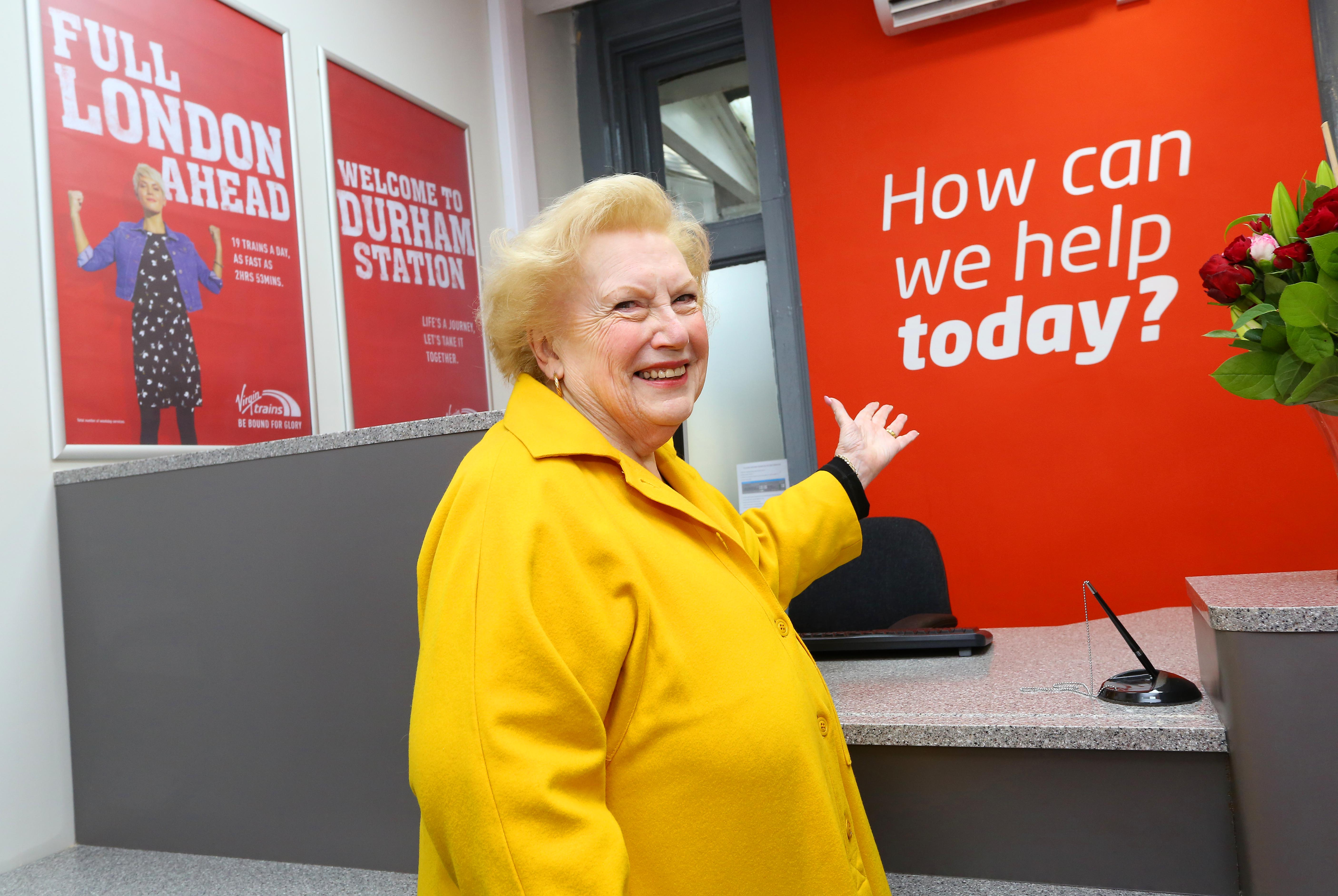
Denise Robertson (1932–2016), dubbed "the best agony aunt in the business"

- 1 March
  - Peter Mathias, 88, economic historian.
  - Tony Warren, 79, television scriptwriter (Coronation Street).
- 2 March
  - Arthur Keily, 94, marathon runner.
  - Paul Webley, 62, educator, president of SOAS, University of London (2006–2015).
- 3 March
  - Lord James Blears, 92, professional wrestler.
  - Anthony Carrigan, 35, academic.
  - Cyril Denis, 71, land developer (London Docklands) and hotelier.
  - Andrew Derbyshire, 92, architect.
  - Tony Dyson, 68, film prop designer (R2-D2).
  - John Thomas, 63, guitarist (Budgie).
- 4 March
  - John Brooks, Baron Brooks of Tremorfa, 88, politician and boxing executive, President of the British Boxing Board of Control and Welsh Sports Hall of Fame.
  - Alistair Stuart, 89, newspaper editor (Scotland on Sunday).
- 5 March
  - John Douglas, 21st Earl of Morton, 88, nobleman.
  - John Evans, Baron Evans of Parkside, 85, politician, MP for Newton (1974–1983) and St Helens North (1983–1997).
  - Alan Henry, 68, motorsport journalist.
  - Henry Hobhouse, 91, author (Seeds of Change: Five Plants That Transformed Mankind).
- 6 March
  - Wally Bragg, 86, footballer (Brentford).
  - Ernest George Mardon, 87, historian.
- 7 March
  - Leonard Berney, 95, military officer, a liberator of Bergen-Belsen.
  - Scott Goodall, 80, comic book writer.
  - Michael White, 80, film and theatre producer (Monty Python and the Holy Grail, The Rocky Horror Picture Show), Tony Award-winner (1971, 1972 and 1976), and subject of The Last Impresario.
- 8 March
  - Jack Jones, 90, Olympic water polo player (1952, 1956).
  - Sir George Martin, 90, record producer (The Beatles), composer, arranger and engineer, six times Grammy Award winner.
- 9 March
  - Bryan Coombs, 81, academic and shorthand expert (Pitman shorthand).
  - Jon English, 66, musician and actor.
- 10 March
  - Sir Ken Adam, 95, production designer (Dr. Strangelove, James Bond, The Madness of King George), Oscar winner (1975, 1994).
  - Anita Brookner, 87, novelist (Hotel du Lac) and art historian, Man Booker Prize winner (1984).
  - Keith Emerson, 71, progressive rock and rock keyboardist (The Nice, Emerson, Lake & Palmer).
- 11 March
  - Doreen Massey, 72, geographer.
  - Brenda Naylor, 89, sculptor.
  - Billy Ritchie, 79, footballer (Rangers, Partick Thistle).
- 13 March
  - Adrienne Corri, 85, actress (Doctor Zhivago, A Clockwork Orange, Doctor Who).
  - Lord Michael Jones, 68, judge.
- 14 March
  - Sir Peter Maxwell Davies, 81, composer and conductor, Master of the Queen's Music (2004–2014).
  - Lilly Dubowitz, 85, paediatrician.
- 15 March
  - Sylvia Anderson, 88, television producer and voice actress (Thunderbirds).
  - Asa Briggs, Baron Briggs, 94, historian, codebreaker and life peer.
  - Sebastian Rahtz, 61, digital humanities researcher.
- 16 March
  - Cliff Michelmore, 96, television presenter and producer (Tonight, 24 Hours, Holiday).
  - Alan Spavin, 74, footballer (Preston North End, Dundalk).
- 17 March
  - Paul Daniels, 77, magician and television presenter (The Paul Daniels Magic Show, Odd One Out, Every Second Counts, Wipeout, Wizbit).
  - DJ Derek, 73, disc jockey. (death reported on this date).
  - Sandy McDonald, 78, Church of Scotland minister, Moderator of the General Assembly of the Church of Scotland (1997–1998).
  - Trevor J. Phillips, 89, educational philosopher (see Transactionalism).
- 18 March
  - Barry Hines, 76, author (A Kestrel for a Knave).
  - John Urry, 79, sociologist.
- 19 March
  - David Green, 76, cricketer (Lancashire, Gloucestershire).
  - Jack Mansell, 88, footballer and football coach.
- 20 March
  - Jon Beazley, television executive (BBC) and producer (Strictly Come Dancing).
  - Jack Boxley, 84, footballer (Bristol City, Coventry City).
  - Mark Sutton, 46, rugby union player (Dunvant).
- 21 March – Robert McNeill Alexander, 81, zoologist.
- 22 March – Petra Davies, 85, actress.
- 23 March
  - David Blackburn, 76, artist.
  - Sir Richard George, 71, food manufacturer (Weetabix Limited).
  - Desmond McKeown, 79, rugby league player (Oldham). (death reported on this date).
  - Sir Peter Moores, 83, businessman (Littlewoods), and chairman of Everton (1960–1965).
- 24 March – Brendan Sloan, 67, Gaelic football player (Down).
- 25 March
  - Ken Barr, 83, artist.
  - Terry Brain, 60, animator (The Trap Door).
  - David Snellgrove, 95, Tibetologist.
- 26 March
  - Michael MccGwire, 91, foreign policy analyst.
  - Bernard Neal, 93, structural engineer and croquet player.
- 28 March
  - Peggy Fortnum, 96, illustrator (Paddington Bear).
  - Derek Robertson, 64, football executive (Dundee United). (death reported on this date)
- 30 March
  - Denys Carnill, 90, field hockey player, Olympic bronze medalist (1952).
  - John King, 77, football player and manager (Tranmere).
  - Andy Newman, 73, pianist (Thunderclap Newman).
- 31 March
  - Ian Britton, 61, footballer (Chelsea, Blackpool, Burnley) and manager (Nelson).
  - Ronnie Corbett, 85, actor and comedian (The Two Ronnies, The Frost Report, Sorry!).
  - Sir Robert Finch, 71, Lord Mayor of London (2003).
  - Dame Zaha Hadid, 65, Iraqi-born architect.
  - Denise Robertson, 83, writer and television broadcaster (This Morning).
  - Jimmy Toner, 92, footballer (Dundee, Leeds United).
  - Kris Travis, 33, professional wrestler.
  - Douglas Wilmer, 96, actor (Sherlock Holmes, Octopussy, Cleopatra).

=== April ===
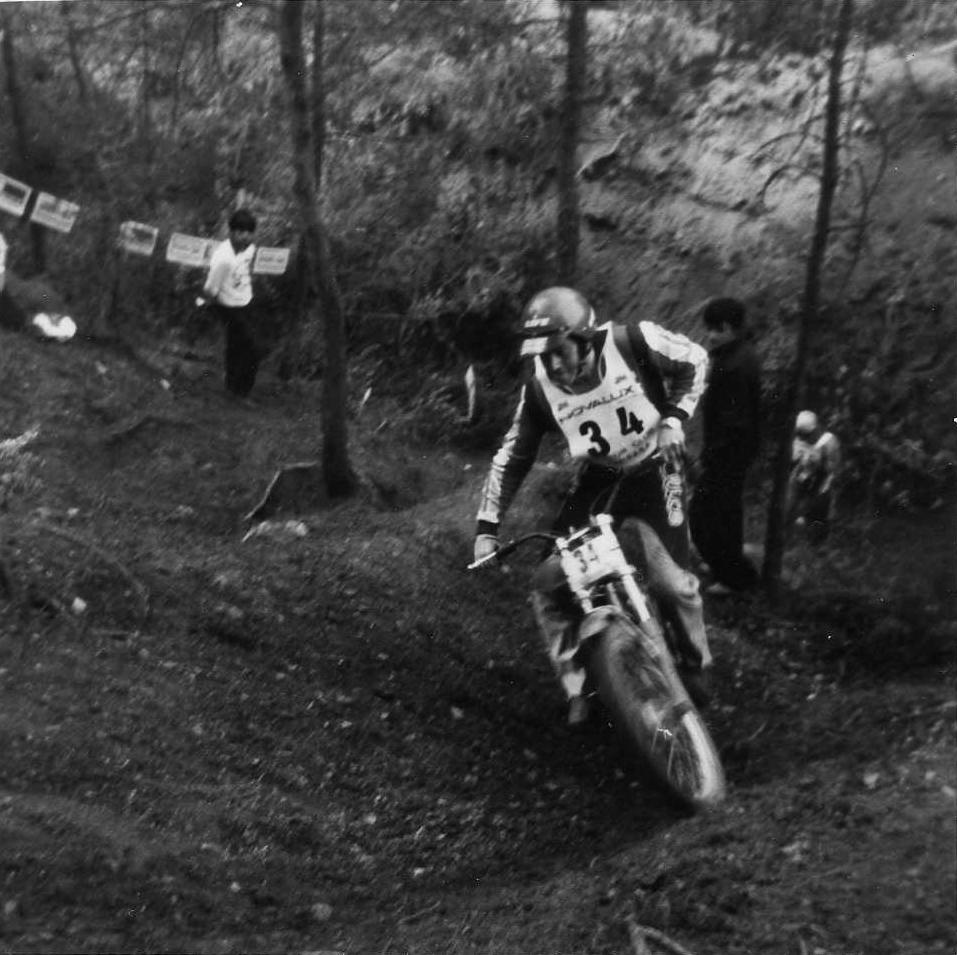
Motorcyclist Martin Lampkin (1950–2016) at the Trial Sant Llorenç in 1978

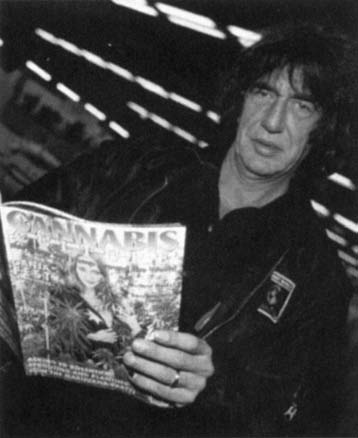
Howard Marks (1945–2016) in 2000

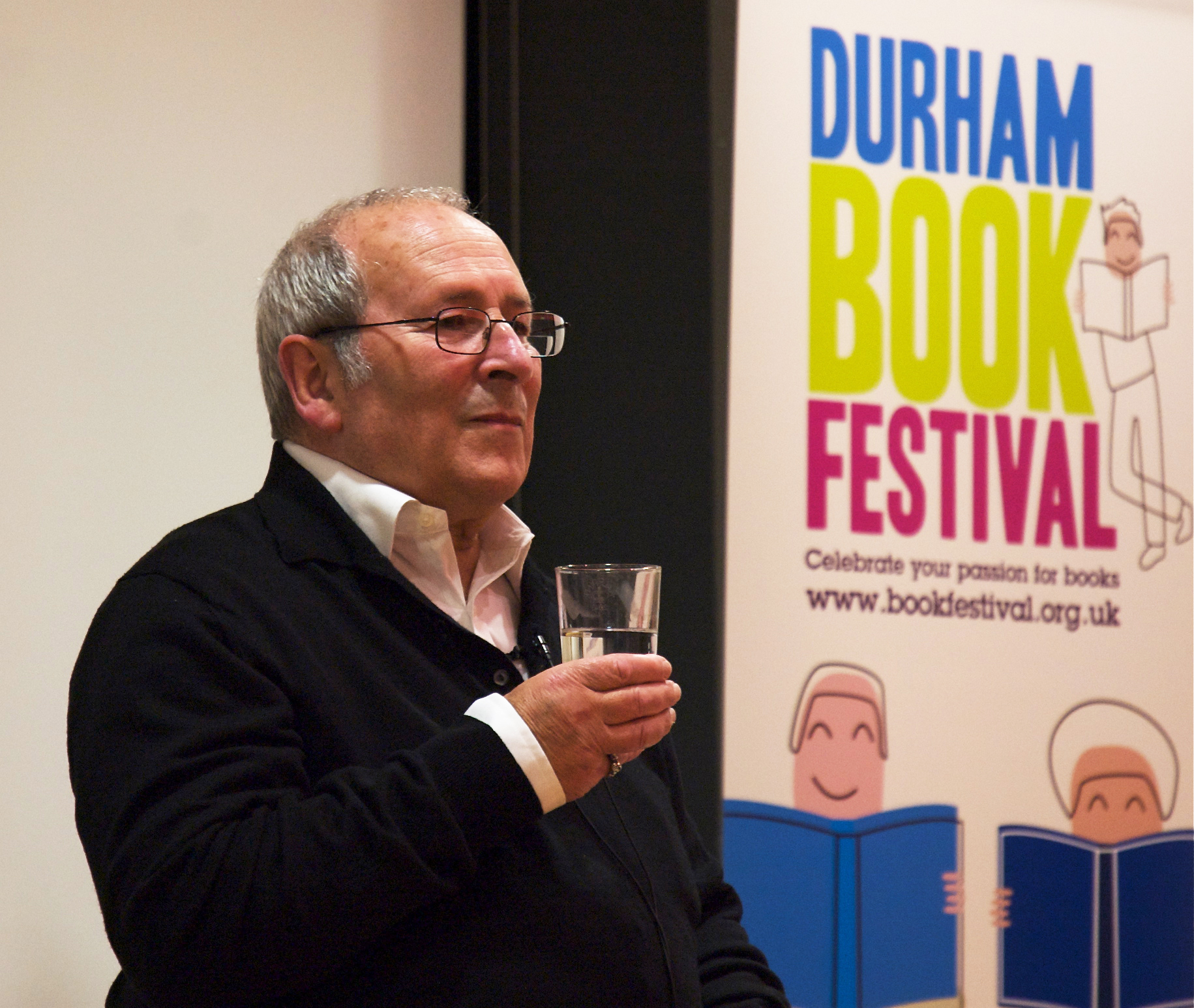
Sir Arnold Wesker (1932–2016) at the Durham Book Festival in 2008

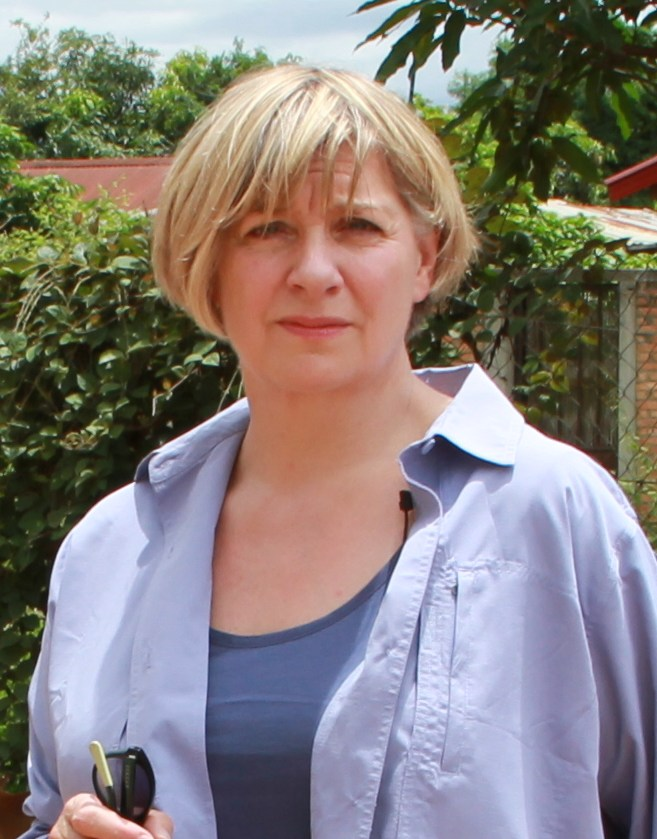
Victoria Wood (1953–2016) in Laos

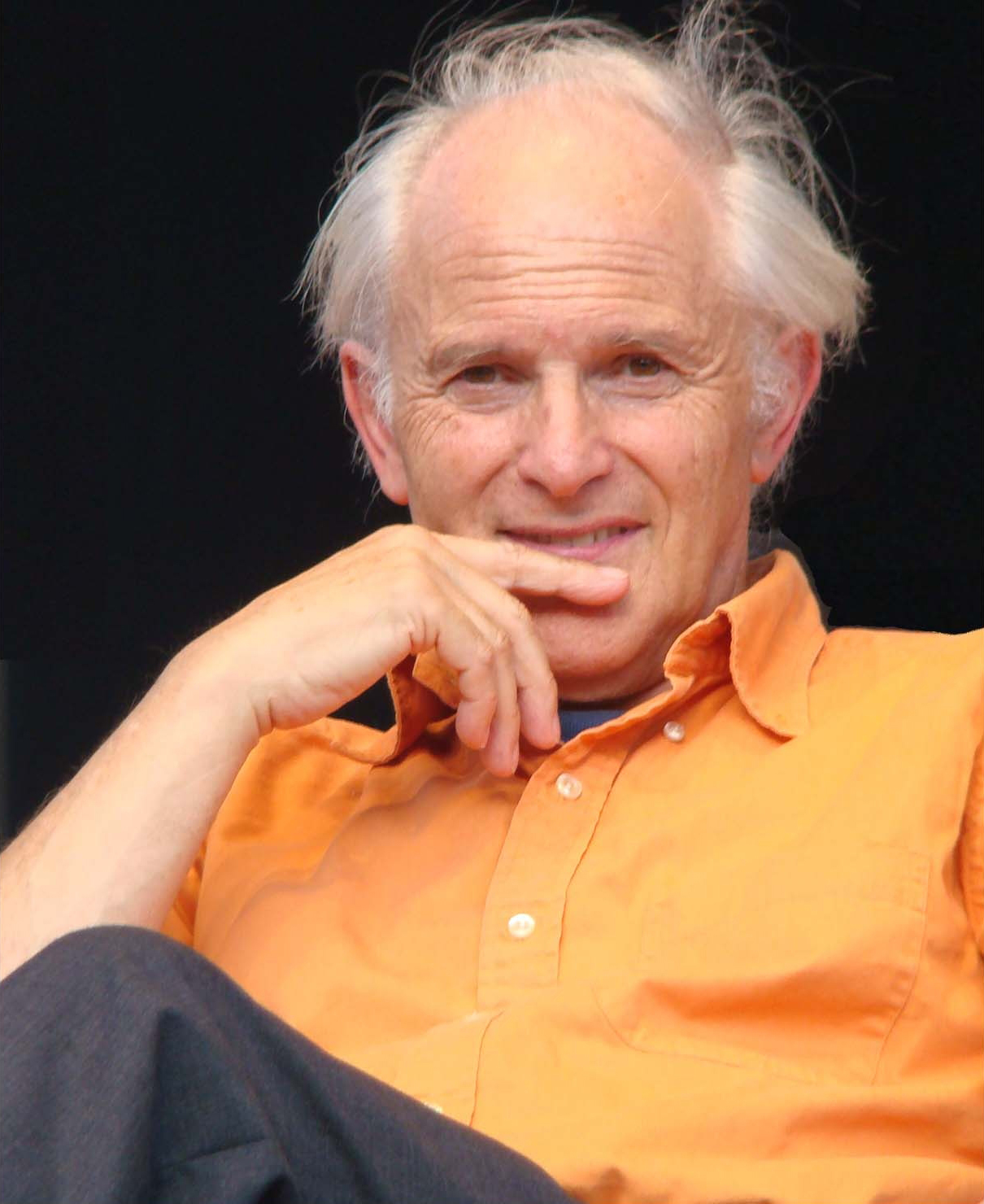
Sir Harry Kroto (1939–2016) in 2010

- 1 April
  - Alan Carter, 86, civil servant, Director of Immigration of Hong Kong (1983–1989).
  - Tony Whittaker, 81, solicitor and politician.
- 2 April – Gareth Jones, 85, legal academic.
- 3 April
  - John Vane, 11th Baron Barnard, 92, nobleman.
  - Martin Lampkin, 65, motorcycle trials rider.
  - John Waite, 74, footballer (Grimsby).
- 4 April
  - Royston Nash, 82, conductor (D'Oyly Carte Opera Company).
  - Ken Waterhouse, 85, footballer (Preston North End, Rotherham United).
- 5 April
  - Henry Hobhouse, 91, journalist and historian (Seeds of Change: Five Plants That Transformed Mankind).
  - Mick Sullivan, 82, rugby league footballer (Wigan), world champion (1954, 1960).
- 6 April – Sid Nathan, 93, boxer and referee (death reported on this date).
- 7 April
  - Adrian Greenwood, 42, art dealer and author.
  - Rachel Johnson, 93, last native of the Scottish island of St Kilda (death reported on this date).
  - Garry Jones, 65, footballer (Bolton Wanderers).
  - Charles Thomas, 87, archaeologist.
  - Ruth Westbrook, 85, cricket player and coach (England).
- 8 April
  - Mildred Gordon, 92, politician, MP for Bow and Poplar (1987–1997).
  - Fred Middleton, 85, footballer (Lincoln City).
  - David Swift, 85, actor (Drop the Dead Donkey).
- 9 April
  - Patrick (Paddy) J. O'Donnell, 68, academic.
  - Martin Roberts, 48, rugby union player (Gloucester Rugby).
- 10 April
  - Howard Marks, 70, cannabis smuggler, writer and campaigner.
  - Adrian St John, 22, cricketer.
- 11 April
  - Emile Ford, 78, singer (Emile Ford and the Checkmates).
  - Nicholas Gargano, 81, boxer, Olympic bronze medallist (1956).
  - Dame Marion Kettlewell, 102, naval officer, Director of the Wrens (1966–1970).
- 12 April
  - Alan Loveday, 88, violinist (Royal Philharmonic Orchestra, Academy of St Martin in the Fields).
  - Sir Arnold Wesker, 83, playwright.
- 13 April
  - Srinivas Aravamudan, 54, academic.
  - Steve Quinn, 64, rugby league player (York Wasps, Featherstone Rovers).
  - Jock Scot, 64, poet and recording artist.
  - Gareth Thomas, 71, actor (Blake's 7, Children of the Stones, Star Maidens).
  - Gwyn Thomas, 79, poet and academic, National Poet of Wales (2006–2008).
- 14 April
  - David Collischon, 78, executive (Filofax).
  - Martin Fitzmaurice, 75, darts personality.
  - Ted Gundry, 81, radio broadcaster (BBC).
  - Sir David MacKay, 48, author, scientist and professor (University of Cambridge).
  - Phil Sayer, 62, voice artist ("Mind the gap").
- 15 April
  - Morag Siller, 46, actress (Emmerdale, Memphis Belle, Casualty).
  - Guy Woolfenden, 78, composer and conductor.
- 16 April
  - Richard Smith, 84, painter.
  - Kit West, 79, special effects artist (Raiders of the Lost Ark, Dragonheart, Return of the Jedi, Enemy at the Gates), Oscar winner (1982).
- 18 April
  - Adrian Berry, 4th Viscount Camrose, 78, peer and journalist.
  - Barry Davies, 71, soldier and extractor of Lufthansa Flight 181 hostages.
  - Karina Huff, 55, actress (The House of Clocks, Time for Loving, Voices from Beyond) and television personality.
  - Sir John Leslie, 4th Baronet, 99, aristocrat and media personality.
- 19 April
  - Harry Elderfield, 72, geochemist and professor (University of Cambridge).
  - Billy Redmayne, 25, motorcycle racer.
- 20 April
  - Cynthia Cooke, 96, nurse, Matron-in-Chief of the Queen Alexandra's Royal Naval Nursing Service (1973–1976).
  - Guy Hamilton, 93, film director (James Bond, Battle of Britain, Evil Under the Sun).
  - Avril Henry, 81, academic.
  - Victoria Wood, 62, comedian and actress (New Faces, Victoria Wood: As Seen on TV, dinnerladies).
  - Jack Tafari, 69, activist.
- 21 April – John Walton, Baron Walton of Detchant, 93, peer.
- 22 April
  - David Beresford, 68, journalist.
  - John Lumsden, 55, footballer (Stoke City).
  - Sir Denys Wilkinson, 93, nuclear physicist.
- 23 April
  - Patrick George, 92, painter.
  - Sir Richard Parsons, 88, diplomat, Ambassador to Hungary, Spain and Sweden.
  - Maurice Peston, Baron Peston, 85, peer, politician and economist.
- 26 April – Mark Farmer, 53, actor (Grange Hill, Minder, Johnny Jarvis).
- 27 April
  - Harold Cohen, 87, computer artist (AARON).
  - Angela Flanders, 88, perfumer.
  - Herta Groves, 96, milliner.
- 28 April
  - Sir Edward Ashmore, 96, Royal Naval officer, First Sea Lord (1974–1977).
  - Jenny Diski, 68, writer (Nothing Natural, Rainforest, London Review of Books).
  - Barry Howard, 78, actor (Hi-de-Hi!).
- 29 April
  - Tim Bacon, 52, restaurateur and actor (Sons and Daughters).
  - Alyson Bailes, 67, diplomat, ambassador to Finland (2000–2002).
  - Dave Robinson, 67, footballer (Birmingham City, Walsall).
- 30 April
  - Sir Harry Kroto, 76, chemist, winner of the Nobel Prize in Chemistry (1996).
  - Phil Ryan, 69, keyboardist (Man).

=== May ===
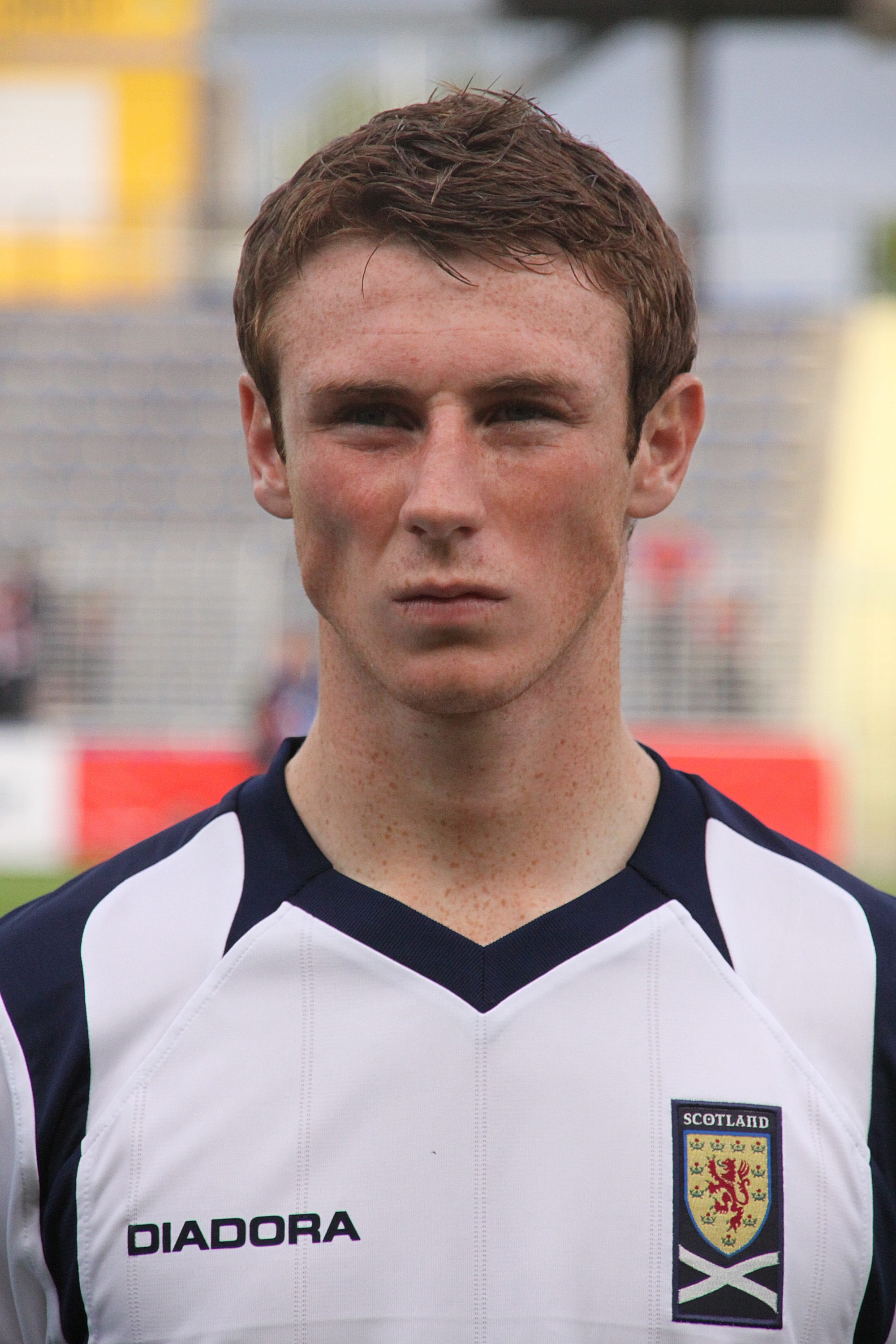
Chris Mitchell (1988–2016) in 2009

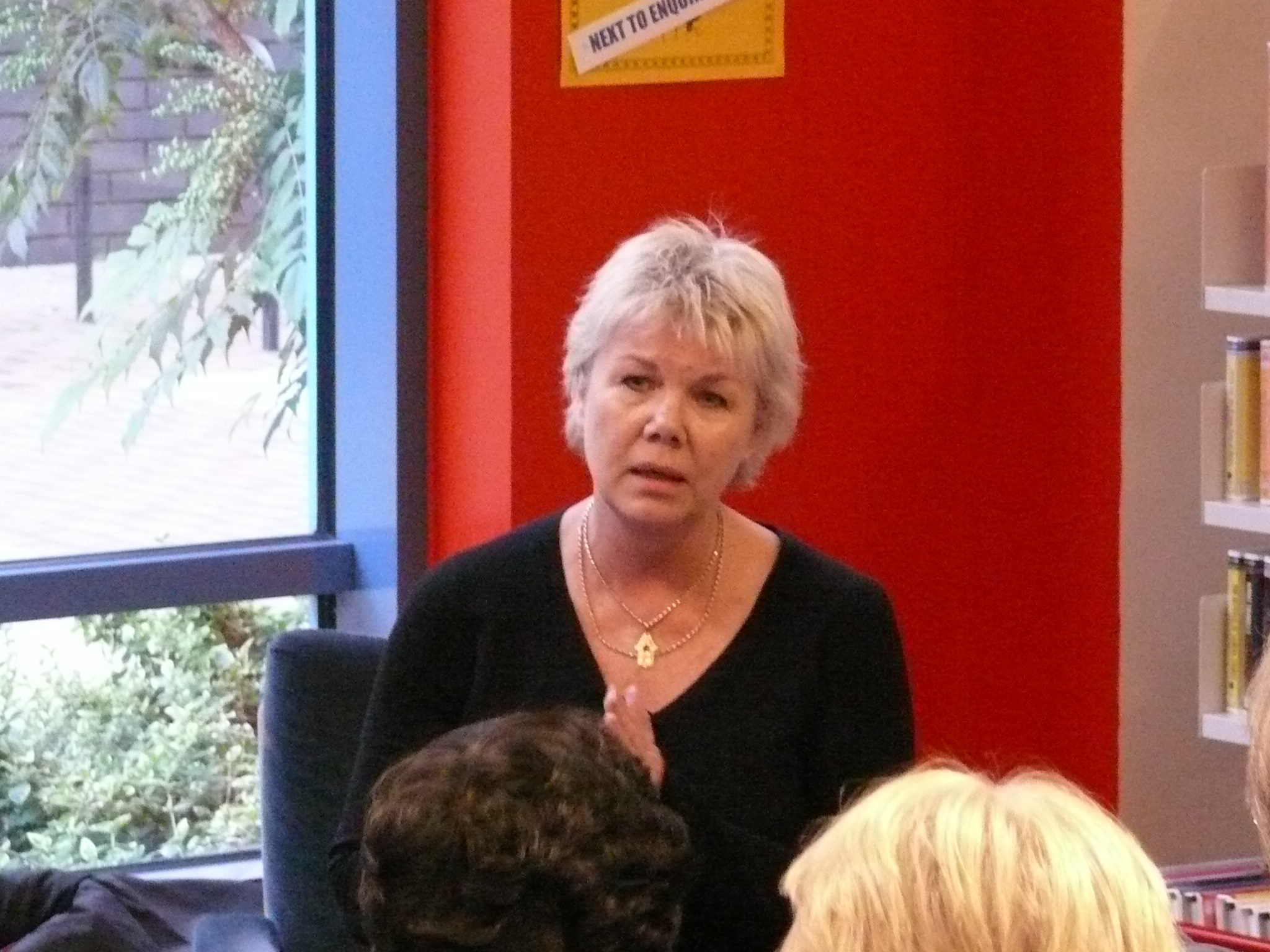
Sally Brampton (1955–2016) discussing depression in 2010

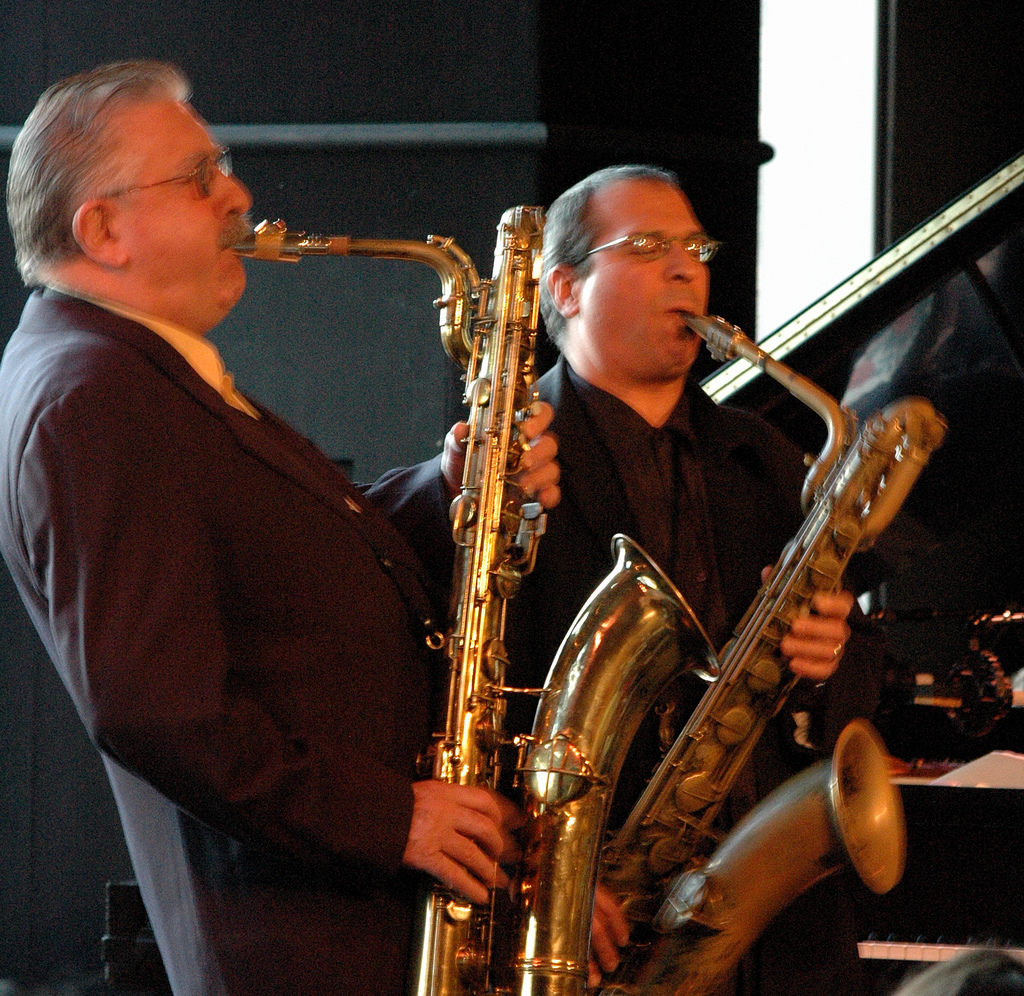
Joe Temperley (1929–2016) (left) performing with Gary Smulyan in 2005

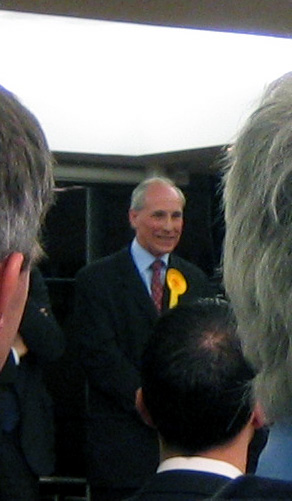
David Rendel (1949–2016) at the Newbury declaration during the 2005 general election

- 1 May – Richard Gilpin, 76, Anglican vicar, Archdeacon of Totnes (1996–2005).
- 2 May
  - Basil Blackshaw, 84, artist.
  - Jonathan Cainer, 58, astrologer (Daily Mail).
  - Richard Davis, 66, radio astronomer.
  - Paul McDowell, 84, actor and singer (The Temperance Seven).
  - Roger Millward, 68, rugby league player (Hull Kingston Rovers, Castleford Tigers, Great Britain).
- 3 May – Kristian Ealey, 38, actor (Brookside, Hollyoaks) and musician.
- 4 May
  - Sir Jack Baer, 91, art dealer.
  - Michael Caborn-Waterfield, 86, businessman (Ann Summers).
- 5 May – Matt Irwin, 36, photographer.
- 6 May
  - Lakshmi Holmström, 81, author and translator.
  - Chris Mitchell, 27, footballer (Queen of the South, Clyde).
- 7 May
  - John Krish, 92, film director.
  - George Ross, 73, footballer (Preston North End).
- 8 May – Sir Iain Glidewell, 91, jurist, Lord Justice of Appeal (1985–1995).
- 9 May
  - Comply or Die, 17, thoroughbred racehorse, winner of the 2008 Grand National.
  - Gareth Gwenlan, 79, television producer (One Foot in the Grave, Only Fools and Horses, The Fall and Rise of Reginald Perrin, To the Manor Born).
  - Bill MacIlwraith, 88, playwright and screenwriter (Two's Company).
  - Dennis Nineham, 94, theologian.
  - John Warr, 88, cricketer (Middlesex).
- 10 May
  - Sally Brampton, 60, writer and magazine editor (Elle).
  - Sarah Corp, 41, television news producer.
  - Nicholas Fisk, 92, children's author.
- 11 May
  - Seb Adeniran-Olule, 20, rugby union player (Harlequins).
  - Bobby Carroll, 77, footballer (Celtic).
  - David King, 73, graphic designer, art collector and writer (The Commissar Vanishes).
  - Joe Temperley, 86, jazz saxophonist (Jazz at Lincoln Center Orchestra).
- 12 May – Sidney Brazier, 96, army bomb disposal officer.
- 14 May
  - Tony Barrow, 80, press officer (The Beatles).
  - John Coyle, 83, footballer (Dundee United, Clyde).
  - Malachi Mitchell-Thomas, 20, motorcycle racer.
  - Kenneth Painter, 71, archaeologist and curator.
- 15 May – Bobby McIlvenny, 89, footballer (Oldham Athletic).
- 16 May
  - Sir Gavyn Arthur, 64, judge, Lord Mayor of London (2002–2003).
  - Anthony Bird, 85, Anglican priest and academic.
  - Ken Cameron, 74, trade unionist.
  - John O. Hughes, 97, football administrator.
  - David Rendel, 67, politician, MP for Newbury (1993–2005).
- 18 May
  - Ethel Bush, 100, police officer.
  - Adrian Flowers, 89, photographer.
- 19 May
  - George Forty, 88, army officer and author.
  - Hugh Honour, 88, art historian.
  - Donald Snelgrove, 91, Anglican clergyman, Bishop of Hull (1981–1994).
- 20 May
  - Malvina Cheek, 100, war artist.
  - Audrey Purton, 90, Women's Royal Army Corps officer.
- 21 May
  - Jane Fawcett, 95, codebreaker at Bletchley Park during the Second World War, and key figure in the sinking of the Bismarck.
  - Sir Denys Henderson, 83, businessman, chairman of ICI (1987–1995).
  - Alan Lewis, 61, footballer (Reading, Derby County, Peterborough United).
  - Chris Meek, 86, racing driver and businessman, owner of Mallory Park.
- 24 May – Burt Kwouk, 85, actor (The Pink Panther, Last of the Summer Wine, Goldfinger).
- 25 May
  - Ian Gibson, 73, footballer (Cardiff City, Coventry City, Middlesbrough).
  - Peggy Spencer, 96, dancer.
  - John Webster, 60, theologian.
- 27 May – Henrietta Phipps, 84, landscape gardener.
- 28 May
  - Patrick Neill, Baron Neill of Bladen, 89, barrister and life peer.
  - Edward O'Hara, 78, politician, MP for Knowsley South (1990–2010).
- 29 May
  - Alan Devereux, 75, actor (The Archers).
  - Edward Morris, 75, art historian.
  - Berrick Saul, 91, economist and academic administrator (death reported on this date).
- 31 May
  - James Campbell, 81, historian.
  - Carla Lane, 87, television writer (The Liver Birds, Butterflies, Bread).
  - Peter Owen, 89, publisher.
  - Pam Royds, 91, publisher.

=== June ===
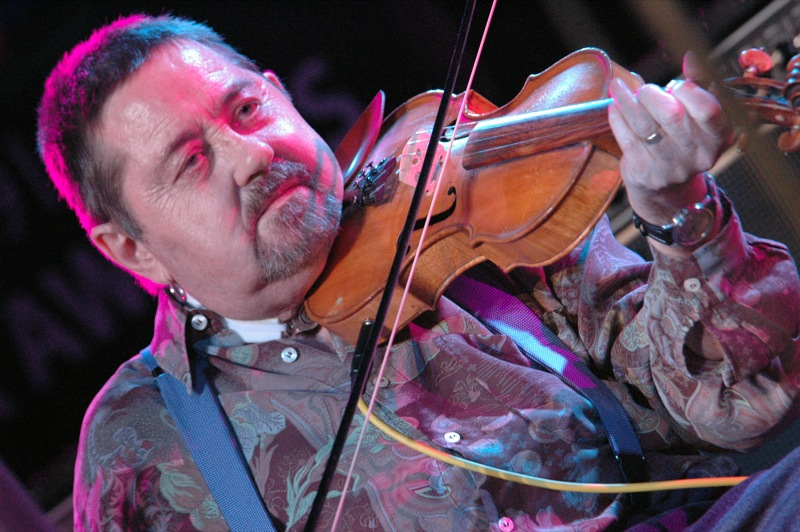
Dave Swarbrick (1941–2016) in 2006

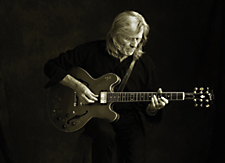
Henry McCullough (1943–2016) in 2008

- 1 June
  - John Taylor, 87, Anglican clergyman and theologian, Bishop of St Albans (1980–1995).
  - Alan Wise, 63, record producer.
- 2 June – Sir Tom Kibble, 83, physicist.
- 3 June – Dave Swarbrick, 75, folk musician and singer-songwriter (Fairport Convention).
- 4 June
  - Annie Castledine, 77, theatre director.
  - Nicky Jennings, 70, footballer (Portsmouth, Exeter City).
  - Sir Brian McGrath, 90, courtier, private secretary to the Duke of Edinburgh.
  - Alan Rathbone, 57, rugby league player (Bradford, Warrington).
- 6 June
  - Harry Gregory, 72, footballer.
  - John Harding, 2nd Baron Harding of Petherton, 88, army officer and peer.
  - Sir Peter Shaffer, 90, playwright (Black Comedy, Equus, Amadeus) and screenwriter, Tony Award winner (1975, 1981).
- 7 June
  - Johnny Brooks, 84, footballer (Tottenham Hotspur, Chelsea, Brentford).
  - Peter Jost, 95, mechanical engineer.
- 8 June – Michael Manser, 87, architect.
- 9 June
  - Hamza Ali, 20, cricketer (Hampshire).
  - Bernard Shrimsley, 85, newspaper editor (The Sun, News of the World).
- 10 June – Alex Govan, 86, footballer (Plymouth Argyle, Birmingham City).
- 11 June
  - Donald Carr, 89, cricketer (Derbyshire, Oxford University, England).
  - Alberto Remedios, 81, operatic tenor.
- 12 June
  - Rodney Leach, Baron Leach of Fairford, 82, banker and politician.
  - Tom Leppard, 80, tattooed man (a.k.a. The Leopard Man).
- 14 June
  - Ronan Costello, 17, rugby league player (Huddersfield Giants).
  - Henry McCullough, 72, guitarist (Spooky Tooth, Paul McCartney & Wings, The Grease Band).
- 15 June
  - Bob Holman, 79, academic (University of Bath) and community worker.
  - Harry Moule, 94, cricketer (Worcestershire).
- 16 June – Jo Cox, 41, politician, MP for Batley and Spen (since 2015), assassinated.
- 17 June
  - Audrey Disbury, 82, cricketer.
  - Sam Beaver King, 90, political activist, Mayor of Southwark (1983), co-founder of the Notting Hill Carnival.
  - Corinne Philpott, 62, judge.
  - Tenor Fly, rapper and ragga vocalist.
- 19 June – Bob Williamson, 67, songwriter and comedian.
- 21 June
  - Karl Dallas, 85, journalist, author and campaigner.
  - Bryan Edwards, 85, footballer (Bolton Wanderers).
- 22 June
  - David J. Hickson, 85, organizational theorist.
  - Harry Rabinowitz, 100, composer (Reilly, Ace of Spies) and conductor (Chariots of Fire, Cats).
- 23 June – Peter Morley, 91, filmmaker.
- 24 June – Steven Hancock, 58, Olympic kayaker (1980) and business executive.
- 25 June
  - Percy Beake, 99, WWII fighter pilot.
  - Patrick Mayhew, Baron Mayhew of Twysden, 86, barrister and politician, Secretary of State for Northern Ireland (1992–1997).
- 28 June – Freddie Gilroy, 80, bantamweight boxer, Olympic bronze medallist (1956).
- 30 June
  - Geoffrey Hill, 84, poet.
  - Gordon Murray, 95, television producer and puppeteer (Trumpton, Camberwick Green, Chigley).

=== July ===
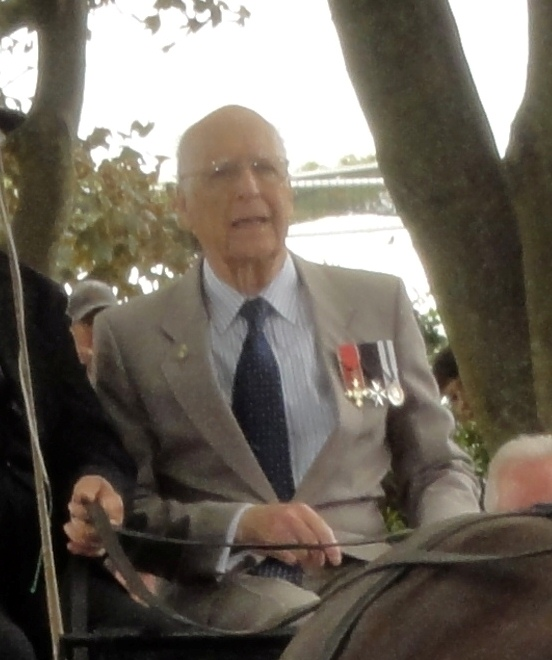
Michael Beaumont (1927–2016) in 2012

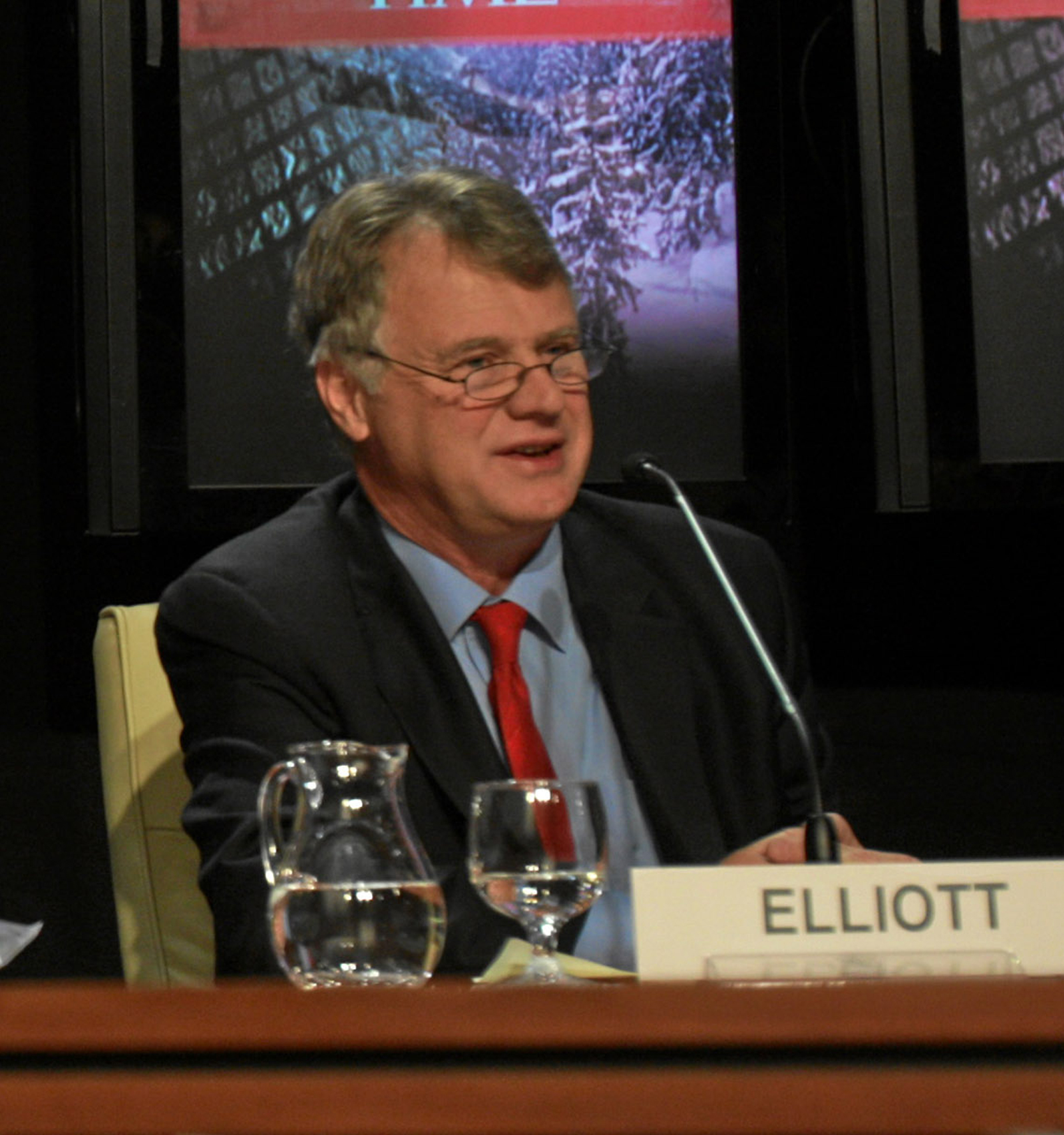
Michael J. Elliott (1951–2016) in 2008

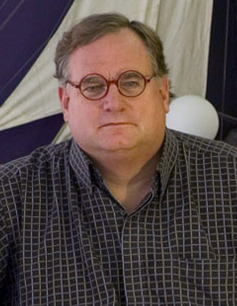
Eric Kuhne (1951–2016) in 2007

- 1 July
  - Tom Boulton, 90, anaesthetirst.
  - Robin Hardy, 86, film director (The Wicker Man).
- 2 July
  - Caroline Aherne, 52, comedian, writer and actress (The Mrs Merton Show, The Fast Show, The Royle Family).
  - Euan Lloyd, 92, film producer (The Wild Geese).
  - Harold "H" Nelson, 88, cycling coach.
  - Robert Nye, 77, poet.
- 3 July
  - Michael Beaumont, 22nd Seigneur of Sark, 88, aristocrat.
  - Jimmy Frizzell, 79, footballer (Greenock Morton, Oldham Athletic) and football manager.
  - John Middleton, 59, footballer (Derby County, Nottingham Forest).
- 4 July – Geoffrey Shovelton, 80, opera singer and illustrator.
- 5 July
  - Beatrice de Cardi, 102, archaeologist.
  - John Baillie-Hamilton, 13th Earl of Haddington, 74, peer.
  - David Jones, 66, politician, member of the States of Guernsey.
  - Brian White, 59, politician, MP for North East Milton Keynes (1997–2005).
  - Victor P. Whittaker, 97, biochemist.
- 6 July – Matthew Evans, Baron Evans of Temple Guiting, 74, politician and publisher (Faber).
- 7 July
  - Sally Beauman, 71, author (Rebecca's Tale, The Landscape of Love).
  - James Gilbert, 93, television producer (The Two Ronnies, Last of the Summer Wine).
  - John O'Rourke, 71, footballer (Middlesbrough, Ipswich Town).
- 8 July
  - Frank Dickens, 84, cartoonist (Bristow).
  - William Lucas, 91, actor (The Adventures of Black Beauty).
  - Cicely Mayhew, 92, diplomat.
  - Jackie McInally, 76, footballer (Kilmarnock, Motherwell, Hamilton Academical).
  - Paddy Phelan, 78, cricketer (Essex) (death reported on this date).
- 9 July
  - Gladys Hooper, 113, supercentenarian, oldest living person in the United Kingdom.
  - Ray Spencer, 82, footballer (Darlington, Torquay United).
- 10 July – David Stride, 58, footballer (Chelsea).
- 11 July – Elaine Fantham, 83, classicist.
- 13 July – George Allen, 84, footballer (Birmingham City).
- 14 July – Michael J. Elliott, 65, newspaper and magazine editor (Time, Newsweek, The Economist).
- 15 July
  - Helen Bailey, 51, author (body discovered on this date).
  - Peregrine Eliot, 10th Earl of St Germans, 75, peer and festival founder.
- 18 July
  - Richard Budge, 69, businessman.
  - John Hope, 67, footballer (Sheffield United).
  - Les Stocker, 73, wildlife expert, founder of Tiggywinkles.
- 19 July
  - Tom McCready, 72, footballer (Wimbledon F.C.).
  - John Pidgeon, 69, writer and broadcaster.
  - Anthony D. Smith, 76, historical sociologist.
- 20 July – Jim Pressdee, 83, cricketer (Glamorgan).
- 21 July
  - John Garton, 74, Anglican prelate, Bishop of Plymouth (1996–2005).
  - Des Rea, 72, boxer.
- 23 July
  - Kate Granger, 34, physician and fundraiser.
  - Sir David Goodall, 84, diplomat, British High Commissioner to India (1987–1991).
- 24 July – Keith Gemmell, 68, musician (Audience, Stackridge, Pasadena Roof Orchestra).
- 25 July
  - Tom Clegg, 81, television and film director.
  - Eric Kuhne, 64, architect (Bluewater Shopping Centre, Titanic Belfast).
- 26 July
  - Roye Albrighton, 67, rock guitarist and singer (Nektar).
  - Anne Balfour-Fraser, 92, film producer.
  - Maggie Macdonald, 63, singer in Scottish Gaelic.
  - Sylvia Peters, 90, continuity announcer and actress (BBC TV).
  - Dave Syrett, 60, footballer (Swindon Town, Mansfield Town, Peterborough United).
- 28 July
  - Norman Guthkelch, 100, paediatric neurosurgeon.
  - Patrick Jourdain, 73, bridge player and journalist.
- 29 July – Ken Barrie, 83, voice actor (Postman Pat) and singer.
- 31 July
  - Gwynn ap Gwilym, 61, author.
  - Bill Holdsworth, 87, cricketer (Yorkshire).

=== August ===
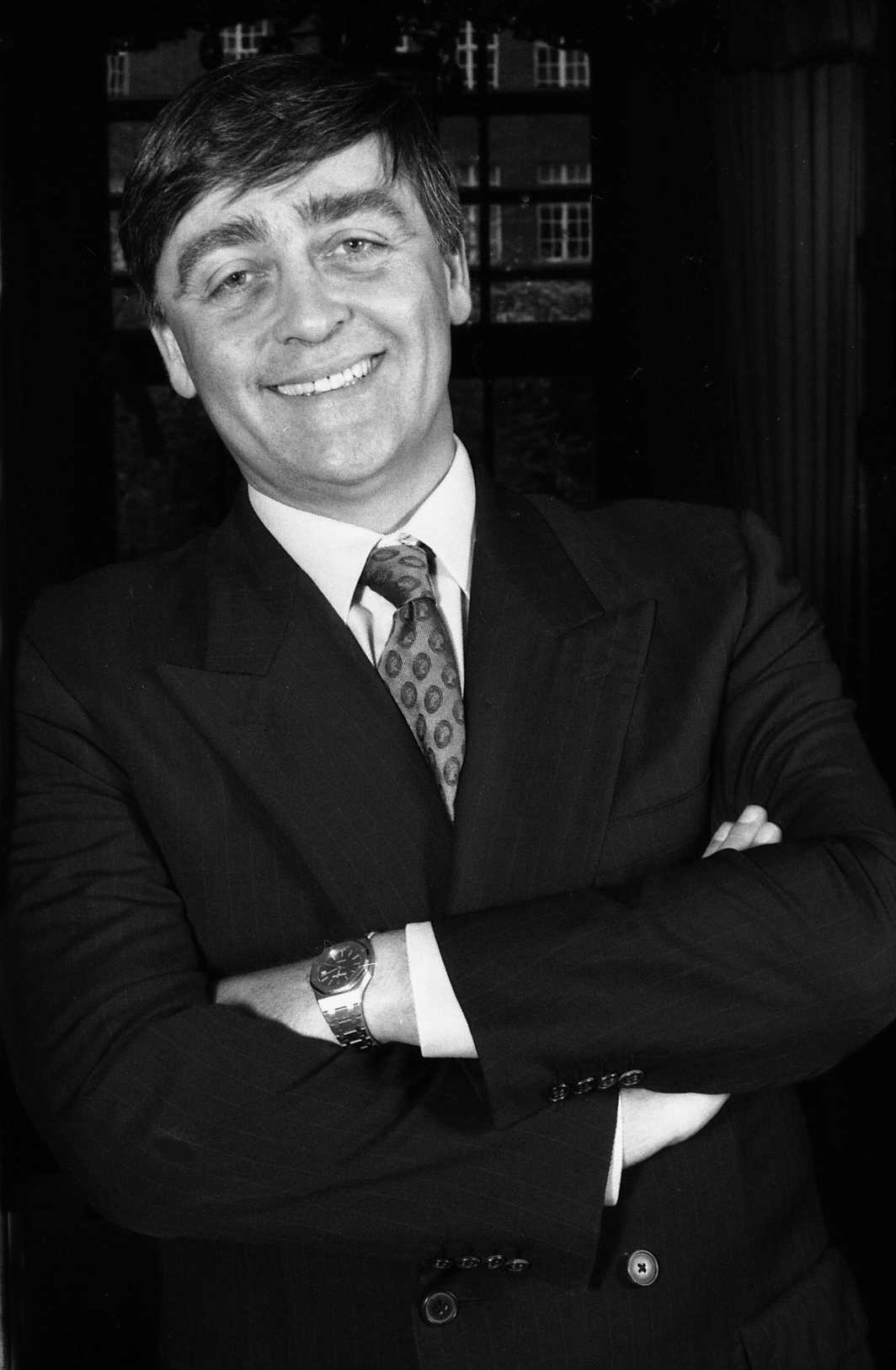
6th Duke of Westminster (1951–2016) in 1997

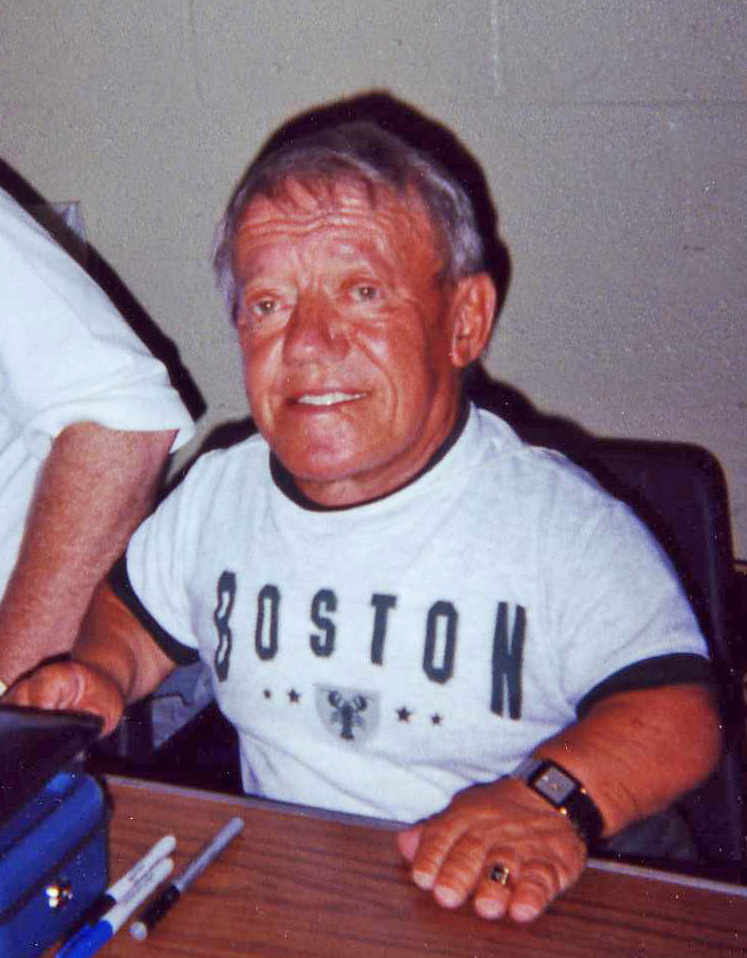
Kenny Baker (1934–2016) in 2005

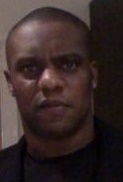
Dalian Atkinson (1968–2016) in 2008

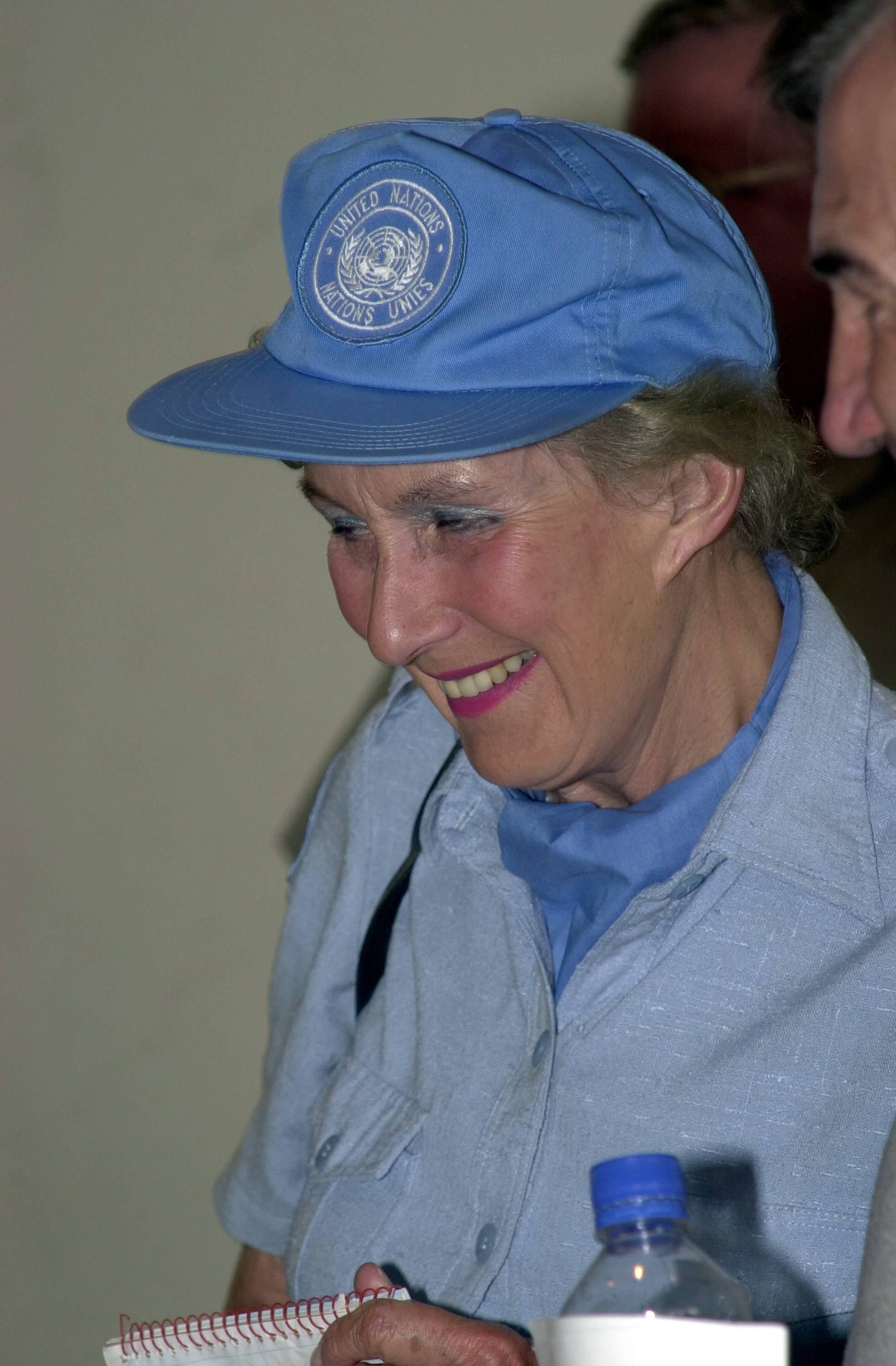
Dame Margaret Anstee (1926–2016) in Honduras in 2002

- 1 August
  - Dai Dower, 83, flyweight boxer.
  - Sir Derek Oulton, 89, civil servant, Permanent Secretary of the Lord Chancellor's Department and Clerk of the Crown in Chancery (1982–1989).
- 2 August
  - Jonathan Borwein, 65, mathematician.
  - Tony Chater, 86, communist activist and newspaper editor (Morning Star).
  - John Fox, 87, cricketer (Durham, Warwickshire, Devon).
  - Neil Wilkinson, 61, footballer (Blackburn Rovers, Port Vale, Crewe Alexandra).
- 3 August – Russell Coughlin, 56, footballer (Carlisle United, Plymouth Argyle, Swansea City).
- 5 August
  - David Attwooll, 67, poet and publisher.
  - Sir Robin Chichester-Clark, 88, politician, MP for Londonderry (1955–1974).
  - Joe Davis, 75, footballer (Hibernian, Carlisle United).
  - Harold Hillman, 85, scientist.
  - Sir Leonard Peach, 83–84, civil servant, Chief Executive of the NHS (1986–1989).
  - John Alan Robinson, 86, philosopher, mathematician and computer scientist.
- 6 August
  - Alan Dossor, 74, theatre director.
  - Kenneth Durham, 62, educationalist, headmaster of University College School.
  - Mel Slack, 72, footballer (Southend United, Cambridge United).
  - Samuel Robin Spark, 78, artist.
- 7 August
  - Jack Sears, 86, race and rally driver.
  - Peter Stein, 90, legal scholar.
  - Roy Summersby, 81, footballer (Crystal Palace, Millwall, Portsmouth).
- 8 August – Edward Daly, 82, Roman Catholic prelate, Bishop of Derry (1974–1993).
- 9 August
  - Gerald Grosvenor, 6th Duke of Westminster, 64, peer, Army major-general and billionaire property developer.
  - Bob Kiley, 80, public transport planner, Commissioner of Transport for London (2001–2006).
- 11 August
  - Roly Bain, 62, priest and clown.
  - Charles Bawden, 92, Mongolist.
  - David Enthoven, 72, music manager (Robbie Williams, T. Rex, Roxy Music) and record label founder (E.G. Records).
- 12 August
  - Keith Blunt, 77, football coach (Sutton United, Malmö, Viking).
  - Sir Swinton Thomas, 85, judge.
- 13 August
  - Kenny Baker, 81, actor (Star Wars, Time Bandits, Flash Gordon).
  - Patricia English, 84, actress.
- 14 August
  - Neil Black, 84, oboist.
  - Robert Goff, Baron Goff of Chieveley, 89, judge and law lord.
- 15 August
  - Dalian Atkinson, 48, footballer (Ipswich Town, Aston Villa).
  - Ieuan Roberts, 66, political activist.
- 17 August
  - John Ellenby, 75, computer scientist.
  - Barry Myers, 79, advertising filmmaker.
- 18 August – Michael Napier Brown, 79, actor, theatre director and playwright.
- 19 August
  - Trevor Baker, 94, meteorologist.
  - Peter Blundell Jones, 66–67, architect and architectural historian.
  - Colin O'Brien, 76, photographer.
  - Danus Skene, 72, politician.
- 20 August
  - Brian Rix, 92, actor (And the Same to You) and activist (Mencap).
  - Tom Searle, 28, metalcore guitarist (Architects).
- 21 August
  - Sir Antony Jay, 86, broadcaster, director and writer (Yes Minister).
  - Derek Smith, 85, jazz pianist.
  - Rab Stewart, 54, footballer (Dunfermline Athletic, Motherwell, Falkirk).
- 22 August
  - Michael Leader, 78, actor (EastEnders, Star Wars).
  - Gilli Smyth, 83, singer (Gong).
- 23 August – Dennis Hackett, 87, journalist and editor (Queen, Nova, Today).
- 25 August
  - Dame Margaret Anstee, 90, diplomat, Director-General of the UN Office in Vienna (1987–1992).
  - G. Spencer-Brown, 93, polymath.
- 26 August
  - Graham Cairns-Smith, 74–75, scientist.
  - J. Alec Motyer, 91, biblical scholar.
  - Michael Phillips, ice dancer.
  - Martyn Quayle, 57, politician, member of the House of Keys (2001–2011).
- 27 August
  - Alan Cuthbert, 84, pharmacologist.
  - Alan Smith, 77, footballer (Torquay United).
- 28 August – Ken Purchase, 77, politician, MP for Wolverhampton North East (1992–2010).
- 29 August
  - Harry Jepson, 96, rugby league administrator.
  - Reg Matthewson, 77, footballer (Sheffield United, Fulham).
- 30 August
  - Dave Durie, 85, footballer (Blackpool, Chester City).
  - Zoe Tynan, 18, footballer, (Manchester City W.F.C., Fylde Ladies).
- 31 August
  - David H. Trump, 85, archaeologist.
  - Brian Wildsmith, 86, artist and illustrator of children's books.
  - Miles Vaughan Williams, 98, pharmacologist.

=== September ===
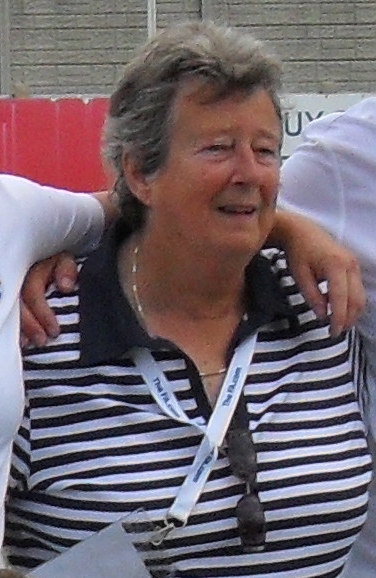
Sylvia Gore (1944–2016) in 2015

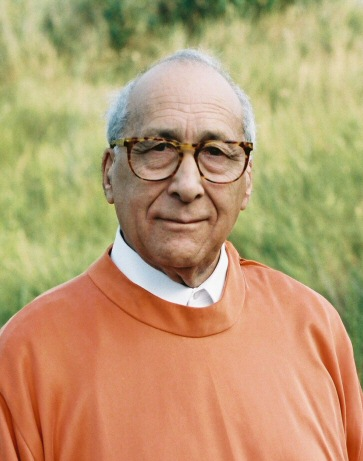
Hidayat Inayat Khan (1917–2016) in 2004

- 1 September – Frans ten Bos, 79, rugby union player (Scotland).
- 2 September
  - David Morgan, 56, journalist.
  - Eileen Younghusband, 95, WW2 air officer and author.
- 4 September
  - David Jenkins, 91, Anglican cleric and theologian, Bishop of Durham (1984–1994).
  - Melvyn Pignon, 86, field hockey player.
- 5 September
  - George McLeod, 83, footballer.
  - Max Murray, 80, footballer (Rangers, West Bromwich Albion).
  - Donald Ranvaud, 62, journalist and film producer (The Constant Gardener, Central Station, City of God).
- 7 September
  - Emlyn Davies, 94, rugby union player (Swansea, Aberavon, Wales).
  - Ken Higgs, 79, cricketer (Lancashire, Leicestershire).
  - Dave Pacey, 79, footballer (Luton Town).
- 8 September
  - Sir Trevor Jones, 89, politician.
  - Bert Llewellyn, 77, footballer (Crewe, Port Vale, Wigan Athletic).
  - John Watts, 69, politician, MP for Slough (1983–1997).
- 9 September
  - Sylvia Gore, 71, football player (England) and manager (Wales).
  - Lord Littlebrook, 87, midget wrestler.
- 11 September
  - Beryl Crockford, 66, rower, world champion (1985).
  - Gavin Frost, 86, Wiccan author.
- 12 September
  - Hidayat Inayat Khan, 99, composer and conductor.
- 13 September
  - Denis Atkins, 77, footballer (Bradford City).
  - Matt Gray, 80, footballer (Third Lanark, Manchester City).
  - Jonathan Riley-Smith, 78, historian.
- 14 September
  - Lady Caroline Faber, 93, aristocrat.
  - Richard Whittington-Egan, 91, writer and criminologist.
  - Gareth F. Williams, 61, author.
- 18 September
  - Stephanie Booth, 70, hotelier.
  - Sir Nicholas Fenn, 80, diplomat, High Commissioner to India (1991–1996).
- 20 September
  - Bernard Bergonzi, 87, literary scholar.
  - Alan Cousin, 78, footballer (Dundee, Hibernian, Falkirk).
  - Jim Semple, 81, businessman.
- 21 September – Jack Rawlings, 93, footballer (Hayes, Hendon).
- 23 September – David Coleman, 73, footballer (Colchester United).
- 24 September
  - Mel Charles, 81, footballer (Swansea Town, Arsenal, Cardiff City).
  - James Crowden, 88, Olympic rower (1952), Lord Lieutenant of Cambridgeshire (1992–2002).
- 25 September
  - Hughie Jones, 89, Anglican rector, Archdeacon of Loughborough (1986–1992).
  - Sir Patrick Sissons, 71, professor of medicine.
- 26 September
  - Don Brothwell, 82–83, archaeologist.
  - Jackie Sewell, 89, footballer (Notts County, Sheffield Wednesday, Aston Villa).
- 27 September
  - Ronald King Murray, Lord Murray, 94, politician and jurist, Lord Advocate (1974–1979).
  - Paddy O'Flaherty, 73, broadcaster.
  - Mike Taylor, vocalist (Quartz).
- 28 September – Graham Hawkins, 70, footballer and football manager.
- 29 September
  - Terence Brady, 77, writer (Upstairs, Downstairs), and actor.
  - Ann Emery, 86, actress (Rentaghost, Billy Elliot, Julia Jekyll and Harriet Hyde).
  - Anthony Ryle, 89, doctor.
- 30 September
  - Gordon Borrie, Baron Borrie, 85, lawyer and life peer.
  - Michael Casswell, 53, guitarist.
  - Victor Munden, 88, cricketer (Leicestershire). (death announced on this date).
  - Mike Towell, 25, professional boxer.

=== October ===
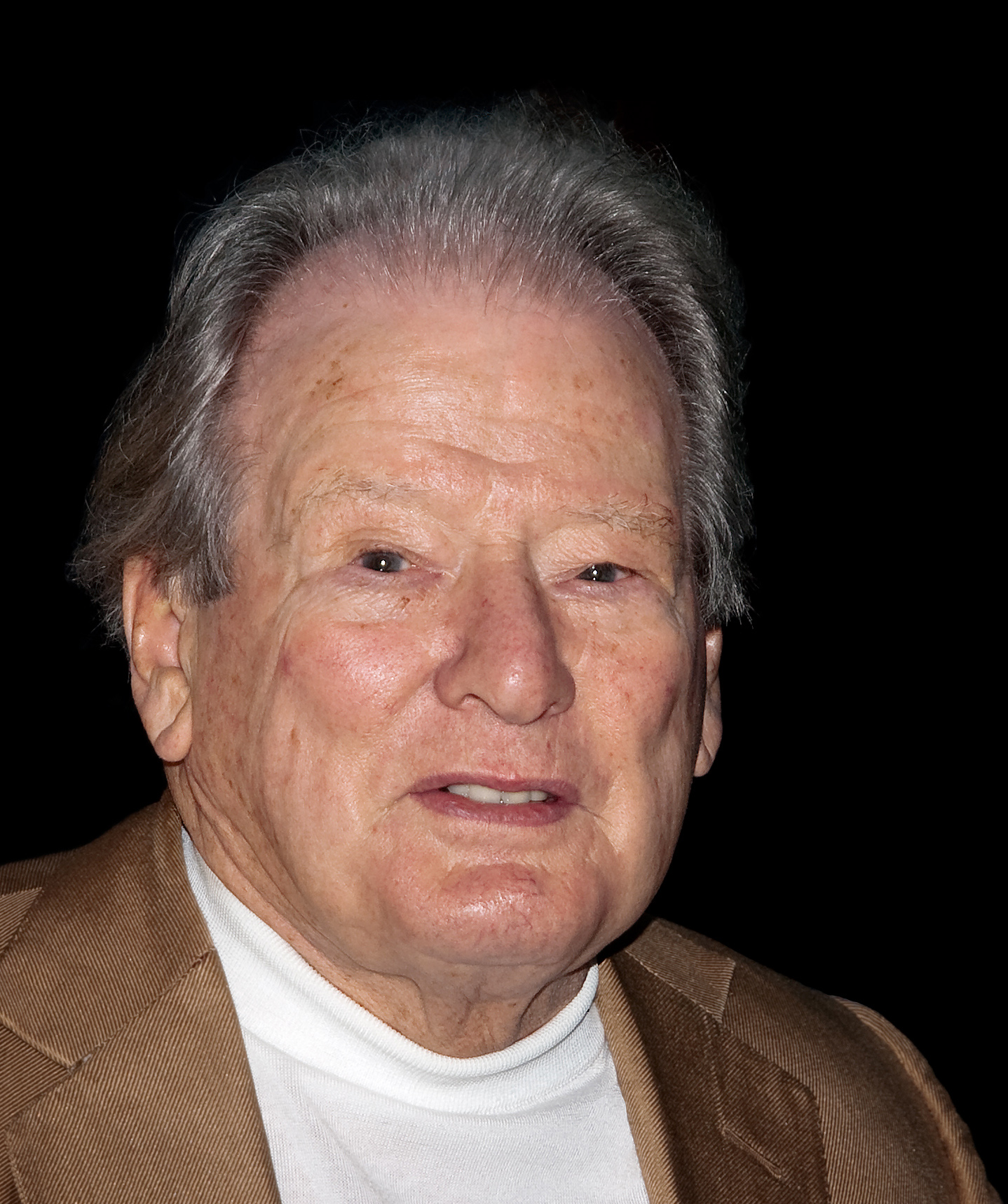
Sir Neville Marriner (1924–2016) in Barcelona in 2010

Andrew Vicari (1932–2016) in 2007

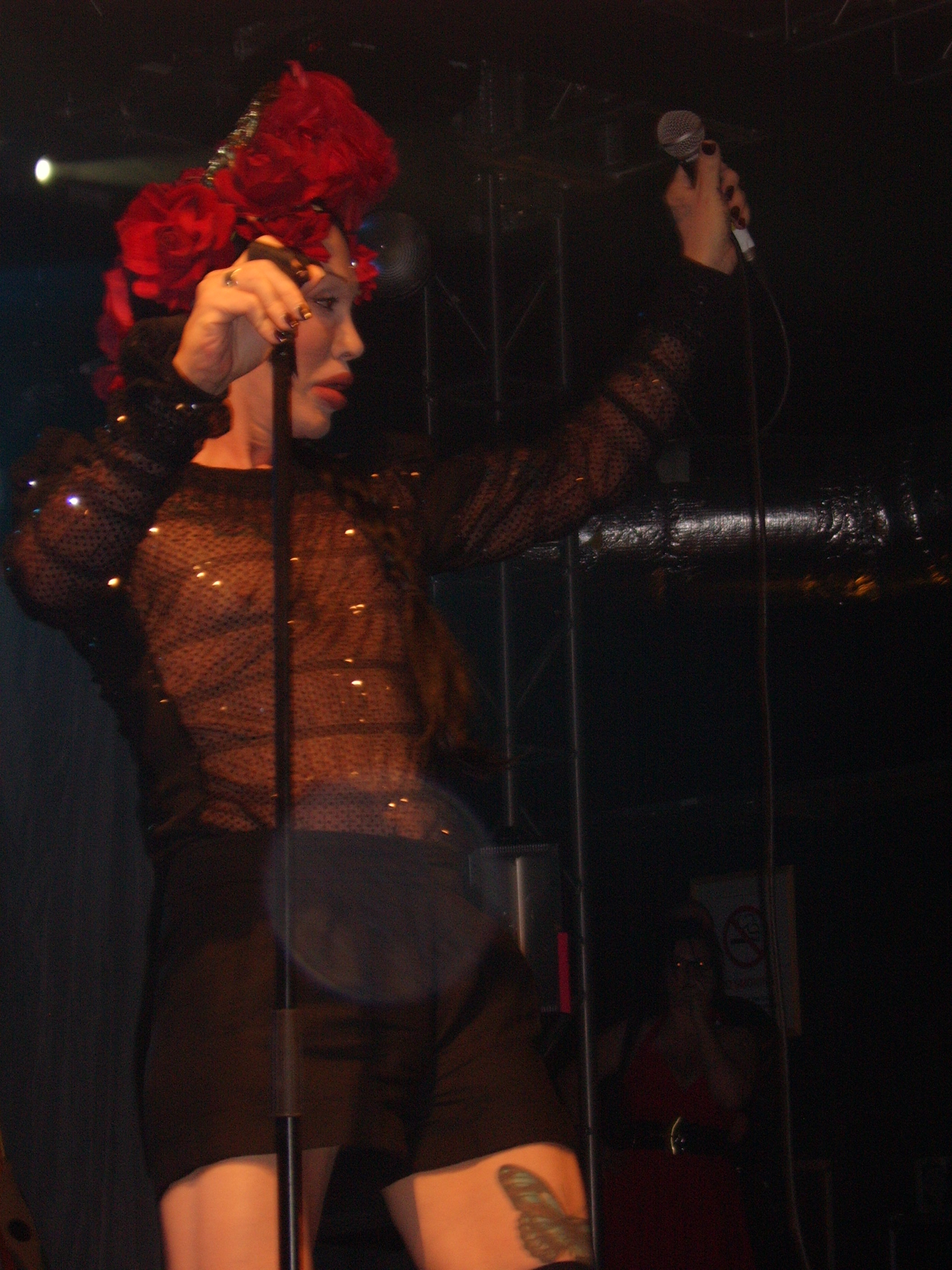
Pete Burns (1959–2016) performing in Liverpool in 2008

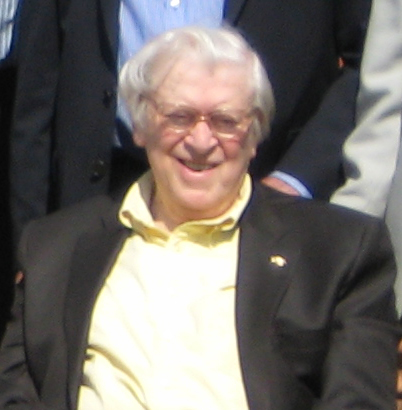
Jimmy Perry (1923–2016) in 2011

- 1 October – David Herd, 82, footballer (Arsenal, Manchester United, Scotland).
- 2 October
  - Steve Byrd, 61, guitarist (Gillan, Kim Wilde).
  - Mary Hesse, 91, academician and educator.
  - Sir Neville Marriner, 92, conductor and founder of the Academy of St Martin in the Fields.
  - Thomas Round, 100, opera singer.
- 3 October
  - Anthony Goodman, 80, historian.
  - Andrew Vicari, 84, painter.
- 4 October
  - Caroline Crawley, singer and musician (Shelleyan Orphan, This Mortal Coil).
  - Stephen de Mowbray, 91, counter-intelligence officer.
  - Merfyn Jones, 85, footballer (Scunthorpe United, Crewe Alexandra, Chester City).
- 5 October – Rod Temperton, 66, keyboardist (Heatwave) and songwriter ("Rock with You", "Give Me the Night", "Thriller"). (death reported on this date).
- 6 October
  - Peter Denton, 70, footballer (Coventry City, Luton Town).
  - Alan Hodgson, 64, cricketer (Northamptonshire).
  - Tony Mottram, 96, tennis player.
  - Mike Tomkies, 88, nature writer.
- 7 October
  - Anne Pashley, 80, athlete and opera singer, Olympic silver medalist (1956).
  - Wolfgang Suschitzky, 104, photographer and cinematographer (Get Carter).
  - Alistair Urquhart, 97, author and soldier in the Gordon Highlanders during World War II.
- 8 October
  - Dickie Jeeps, 84, rugby union player (Northampton Saints) and administrator (Sports Council).
  - Michael Horace Miller, 88, RAF air commodore.
- 9 October
  - Angus Grant, 49, fiddler (Shooglenifty, Swamptrash).
  - Sir Anthony Grant, 91, politician, MP for Harrow Central (1964–1983), and Cambridgeshire South West (1983–1997).
  - David Konstant, 86, Roman Catholic prelate, Bishop of Leeds (1985–2004).
- 10 October
  - Gerry Gow, 64, footballer (Bristol City, Manchester City, Rotherham United).
  - Graham C. Greene, 80, publisher (Jonathan Cape).
  - Drew Nelson, 60, solicitor, politician, and Grand Secretary of the Grand Orange Lodge of Ireland.
  - Eddie O'Hara, 80, footballer (Falkirk, Everton, Barnsley).
- 11 October
  - Peter Reynolds, 58, composer.
  - Ewen Whitaker, 94, astronomer.
- 12 October
  - Mark Fisher, 57, pop musician (Matt Bianco).
  - Leo Harrison, 94, cricketer (Hampshire).
- 13 October – William Gilbert Chaloner, 87, palaeobotanist.
- 14 October
  - Jean Alexander, 90, actress (Coronation Street, Last of the Summer Wine).
  - John Mone, 87, Roman Catholic prelate, Bishop of Paisley (1988–2004).
- 15 October
  - Colin George, 87, actor and director.
  - John Spanswick, 83, cricketer (Kent).
- 16 October
  - Valerie Hunter Gordon, 94, inventor of the disposable nappy.
  - Molly Rose, 95, World War II aviator.
- 17 October – George Peebles, 80, footballer (Dunfermline Athletic, Stirling Albion).
- 18 October
  - Dave Colclough, 52, professional poker player.
  - Alan Collins, 88, sculptor.
  - Mike Daniels, 88, jazz trumpeter and bandleader.
  - Marianne de Trey, 102, potter.
  - Huw Jones, 82, Anglican clergyman, Bishop of St. David's (1996–2001).
  - William McKelvey, 82, politician, MP for Kilmarnock and Loudoun (1983–1997).
  - Sir Sigmund Sternberg, 95, philanthropist, businessman and Labour Party donor.
- 19 October
  - Mark Birch, 67, jockey.
  - Rough Quest, 30, racehorse, winner of the 1996 Grand National.
  - Norman Sherry, 91, author.
  - Gary Sprake, 71, footballer (Leeds United, Wales).
  - Sammy Smyth, 91, footballer (Wolverhampton Wanderers).
- 20 October – Benedict Read, 71, art historian.
- 21 October
  - Dave Cash, 74, radio presenter.
  - Roy Jennings, 84, footballer (Brighton and Hove Albion).
  - Richard Nicoll, 39, fashion designer.
  - Raine Spencer, Countess Spencer, 87, socialite and politician.
- 22 October
  - Martin Aitchison, 96, illustrator (Eagle).
  - Steve Dillon, 54, comic book artist (Preacher, The Punisher, Hellblazer).
  - Gordon Hamilton, 50, climate scientist.
- 23 October
  - Pete Burns, 57, singer-songwriter (Dead or Alive).
  - Jimmy Perry, 93, actor and scriptwriter (Dad's Army, It Ain't Half Hot Mum, Hi-de-Hi!, You Rang, M'Lord?).
- 24 October
  - Benjamin Creme, 93, artist, author and esotericist.
  - Roland Dobbs, 91, physicist.
- 25 October – Howard Davies, 71, theatre and television director.
- 27 October
  - Brian Hill, 75, footballer (Coventry City).
  - David Nash, 77, rugby union player.
  - Bobby Wellins, 80, jazz saxophonist.
- 29 October
  - Raymond Gilmour, 56 or 57, undercover agent, infiltrated INLA and PIRA. (death reported on this date).
  - Dave Lanning, 78, sports commentator.
- 30 October – Jack Braughton, 95, Olympic long-distance runner (1948).
- 31 October
  - Victor Cannings, 97, cricketer (Hampshire).
  - Jimmy Gray, 90, cricketer (Hampshire).
  - Ray Mabbutt, 80, footballer.
  - Lionel Morrison, 81, journalist and trade unionist.

=== November ===
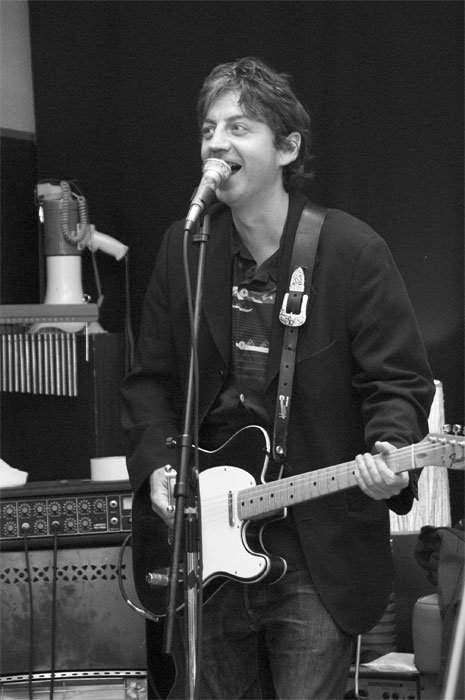
Bap Kennedy (1962–2016) in 2009

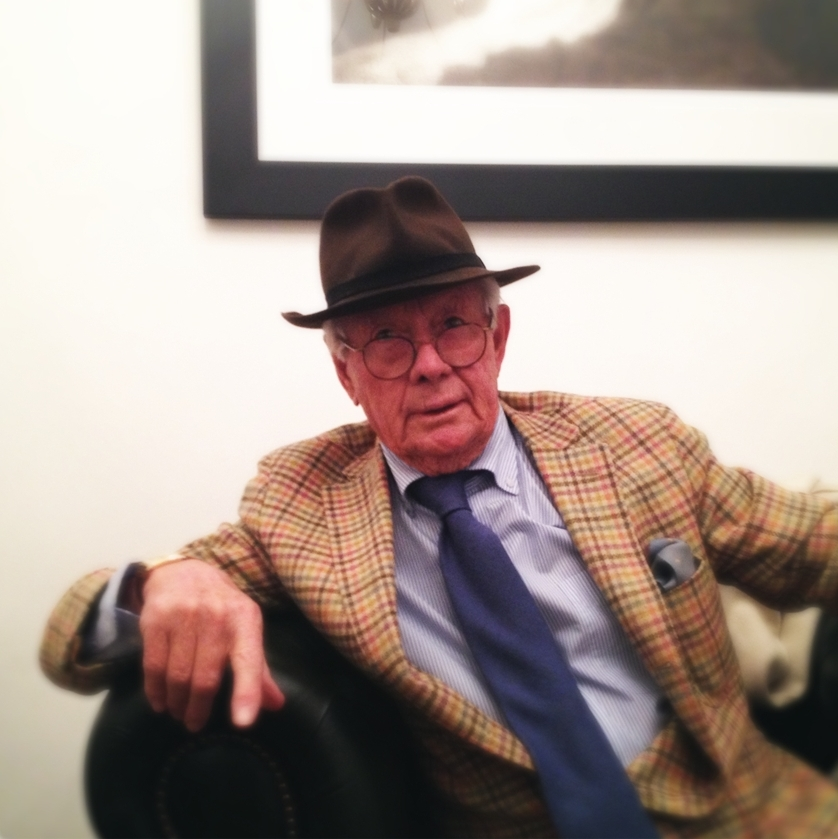
David Hamilton (1933–2016) in 2012

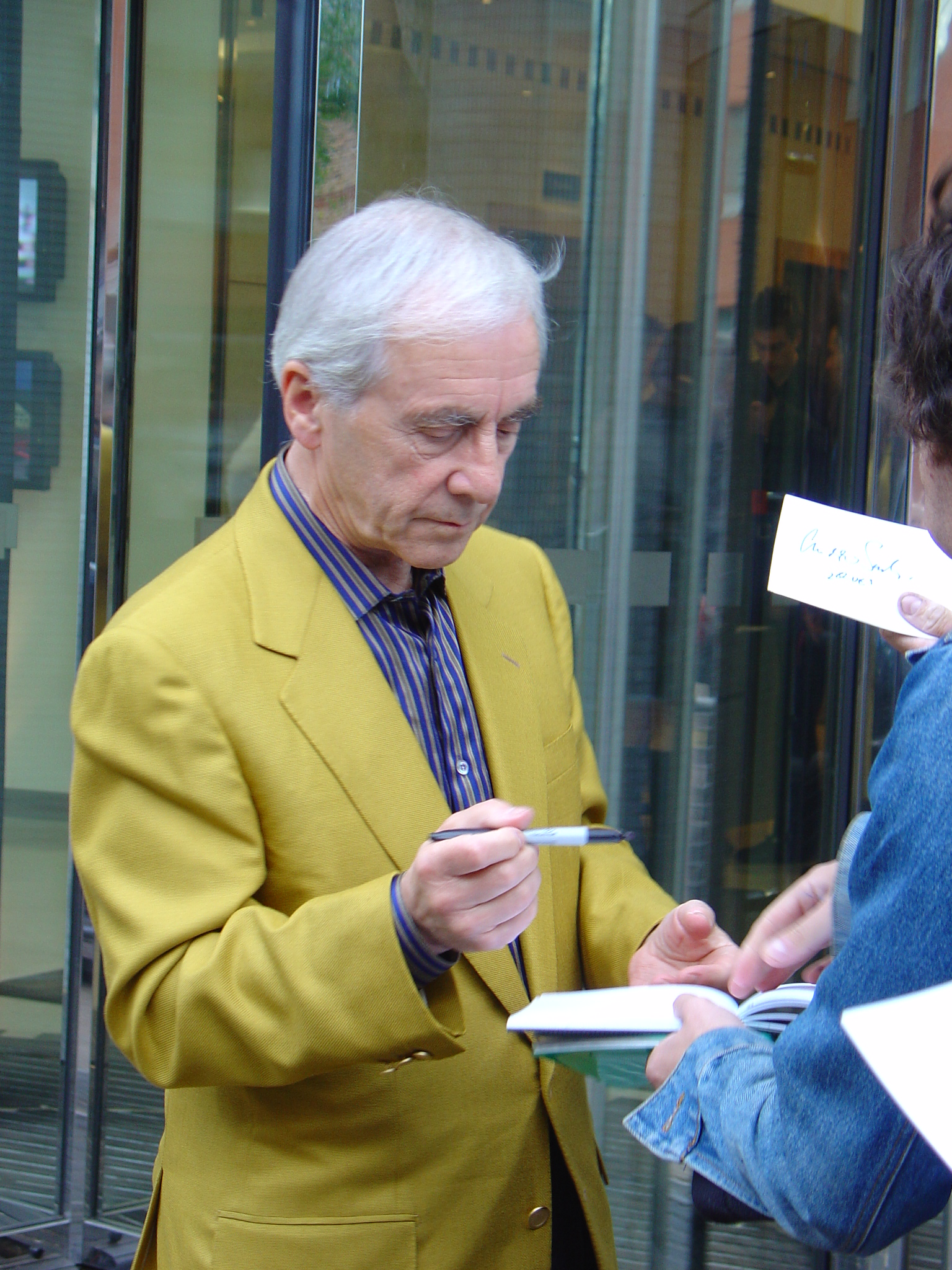
Andrew Sachs (1930–2016), best known for playing Manuel in Fawlty Towers, in 2004

- 1 November
  - Bap Kennedy, 54, singer-songwriter.
  - Martin Leach, 59, automotive executive (NextEV Formula E Team).
- 5 November
  - John Carson, 89, actor (Doomsday, Captain Kronos – Vampire Hunter, Doctor Who).
  - Giles Waterfield, 67, art historian and curator (Dulwich Picture Gallery).
- 6 November
  - Roddy Evans, 81, rugby union player.
  - Mick Granger, 85, footballer (York City).
  - Thomas Martyn, 69, rugby league player (Leigh, Warrington, England).
- 7 November
  - Thomas Gardner, 93, footballer (Everton).
  - Sir Jimmy Young, 95, singer ("Unchained Melody", "More", "The Man from Laramie") and radio broadcaster (Radio 2).
- 8 November – Ian Cowan, 71, footballer (Partick Thistle, Falkirk, Dunfermline Athletic).
- 9 November
  - Jack Bodell, 76, heavyweight boxer, British champion (1969–1970, 1971–1972).
  - Branse Burbridge, 95, World War Two fighter pilot.
  - Martin Stone, 69, guitarist (The Action) and bookseller.
- 11 November
  - Sir Ralph Kohn, 88, medical scientist.
  - Sir Aubrey Trotman-Dickenson, 90, chemist.
- 12 November – Louis Devereux, 85, cricketer (Worcestershire, Glamorgan).
- 13 November
  - Don Rutherford, 79, rugby union player.
  - Sir Mota Singh, 86, judge.
  - Denys Smith, 92, racehorse trainer.
- 15 November
  - Bobby Campbell, 60, footballer (Bradford City).
  - Ken Grieve, 74, television director (The Bill, Peak Practice, Doctor Who).
- 16 November – Len Allchurch, 83, footballer (Swansea City, Sheffield United, Wales).
- 17 November – Steve Truglia, 54, stuntman (The Wolfman, Mission: Impossible – Rogue Nation, Hollyoaks).
- 18 November
  - Jerzy Cynk, 91, aviation historian.
  - Paul Newbold, 71, econometrist.
- 19 November – David Turner-Samuels, 98, barrister.
- 20 November
  - Sally Grace, 78, actress (The Animals of Farthing Wood) and voice teacher.
  - Tim Heald, 72, author and journalist.
- 22 November – Craig Gill, 44, rock drummer (Inspiral Carpets).
- 23 November
  - Joe Lennon, 80–81, Gaelic footballer (Down).
  - Andrew Sachs, 86, actor (Fawlty Towers, Coronation Street, Hitler: The Last Ten Days).
- 24 November
  - Michael Abbensetts, 78, playwright.
  - Paul Futcher, 60, footballer (Manchester City, Barnsley, Grimsby Town).
- 25 November
  - David Hamilton, 83, photographer.
  - Margaret Rhodes, 91, writer and cousin of Elizabeth II.
  - Thomas Taylor, Baron Taylor of Blackburn, 87, Labour politician.
- 26 November – David Provan, 75, footballer (Rangers, Crystal Palace).
- 27 November
  - Bernard Gallagher, 87, actor (Casualty, Crown Court, Downton Abbey).
  - Valerie Gaunt, 84, actress (The Curse of Frankenstein, Dracula).
  - John Mansfield, 108, oldest man in the United Kingdom.
- 28 November – Sir John Swire, 89, businessman (Swire Group).
- 29 November
  - Joe Dever, 60, author (Lone Wolf).
  - Duncan B. Forrester, 83, theologian.
  - Norman Oakley, 77, footballer (Hartlepool United, Doncaster Rovers, Grimsby Town).
- 30 November – Leonard of Mayfair, 78, hairdresser.

=== December ===
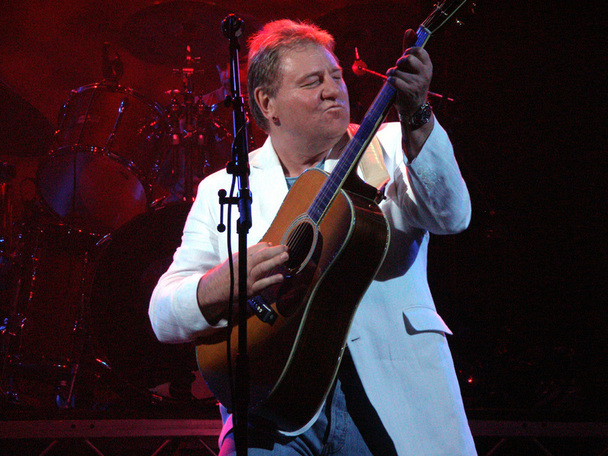
Greg Lake (1947–2016) in 2005

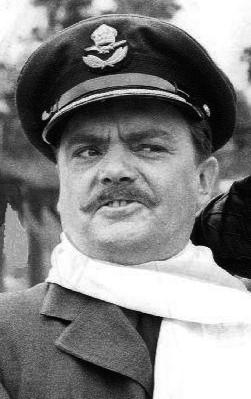
Bernard Fox (1927–2016) in the film Hogan's Heroes

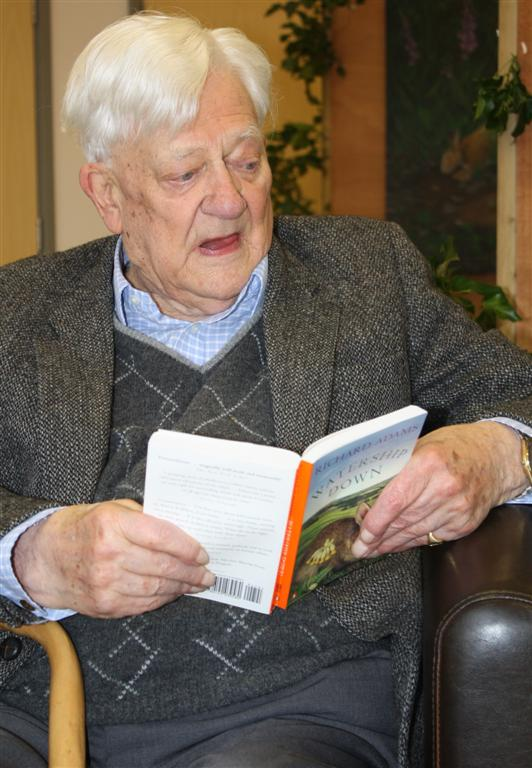
Richard Adams (1920–2016), author of Watership Down, in 2008

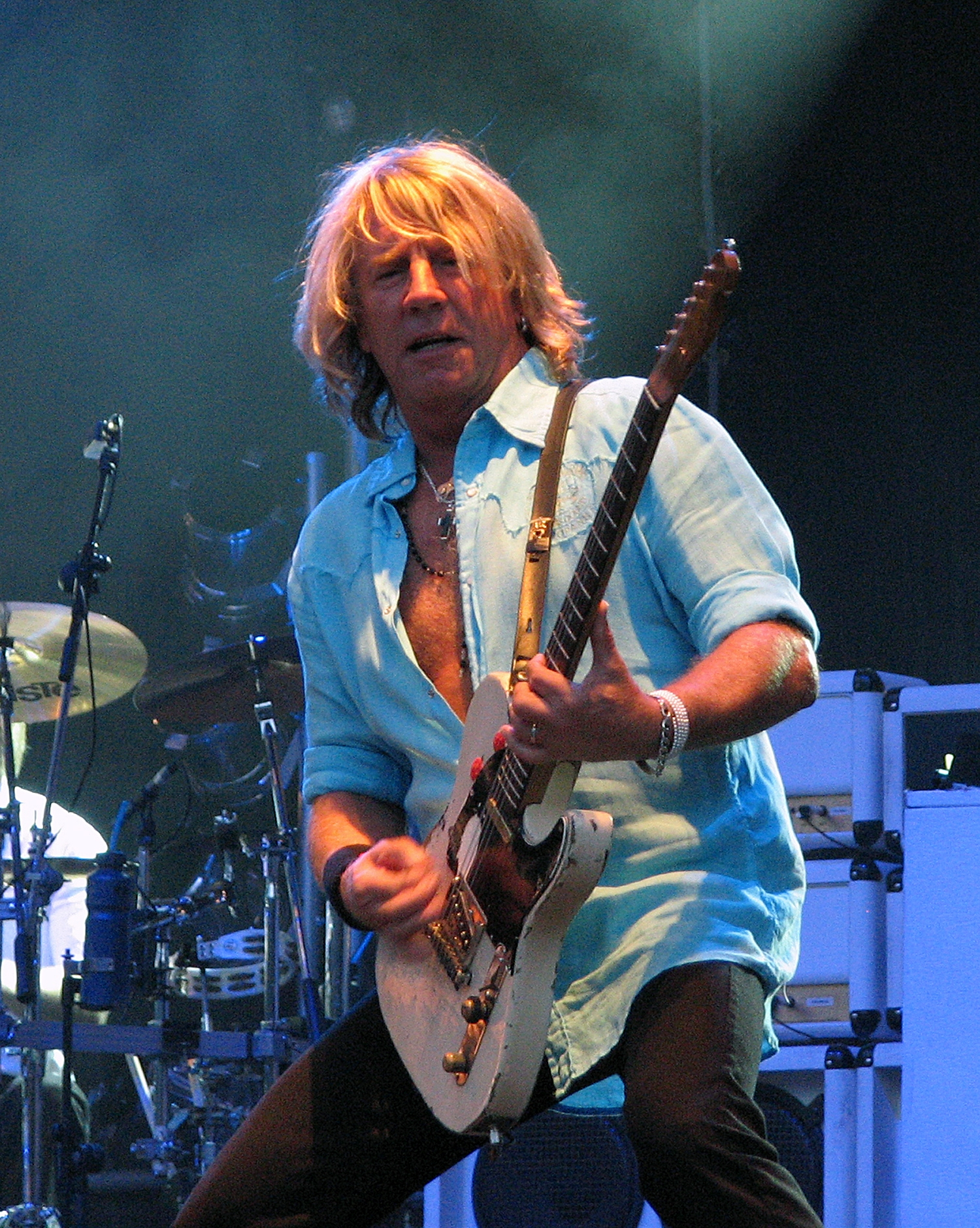
Rick Parfitt (1948–2016) in Sweden in 2007

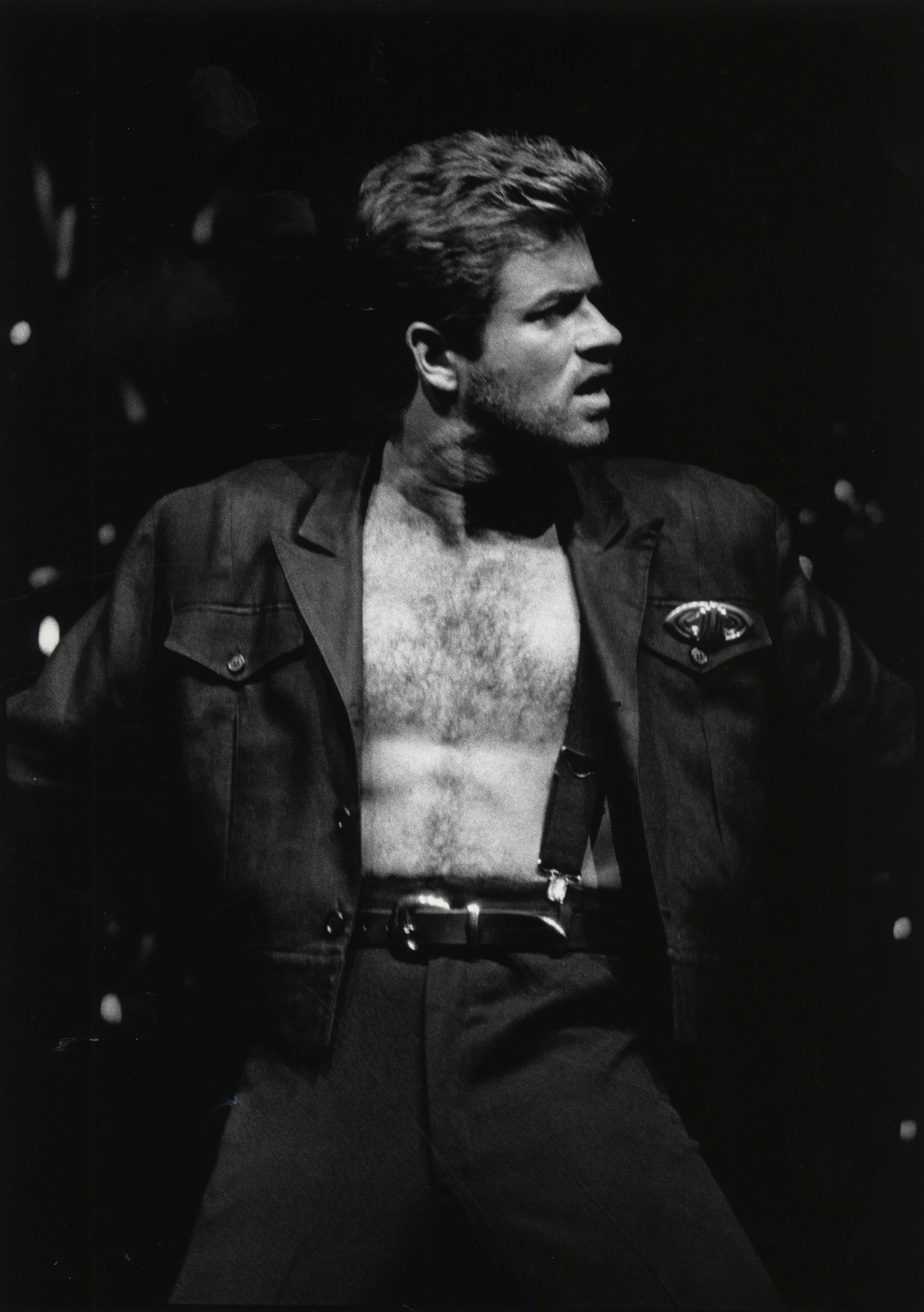
George Michael (1963–2016) in 1988

- 1 December
  - Micky Fitz, punk singer (The Business).
  - Barry Lloyd, 63, cricketer (Glamorgan).
- 2 December
  - Coral Atkins, 80, actress (A Family at War, Emmerdale).
  - Jean Stead, 90, journalist (The Guardian).
- 3 December – Arthur Latham, 86, politician, MP for Paddington North (1969–1974) and Paddington (1974–1979), Leader of the London Borough of Havering (1990–1996).
- 4 December
  - Lady Moyra Browne, 98, nursing administrator.
  - Peter Latham, 91, air marshal.
  - Patricia Robins, 95, novelist.
- 6 December
  - Dave MacLaren, 82, football player and manager (Plymouth Argyle).
  - Peter Vaughan, 93, actor (Game of Thrones, Porridge, Brazil).
- 7 December
  - Brian Bulless, 83, footballer (Hull City).
  - Ian Cartwright, 52, footballer (Wolverhampton Wanderers).
  - Alex Johnstone, 55, politician, MSP for North East Scotland (since 1999).
  - Greg Lake, 69, singer and musician (King Crimson, ELP).
  - Helen Roseveare, 91, Christian missionary.
  - Romilly Squire of Rubislaw, 63, heraldic artist.
  - Allan Stewart, 74, politician, MP for East Renfrewshire (1979–1983), and Eastwood (1983–1997).
- 8 December
  - Gareth Griffiths, 85, rugby union player (Cardiff, Wales).
  - Peter Jackson, 90, animal conservationist and journalist.
  - Dame Sheila Quinn, 96, nurse, President of the Royal College of Nursing (1982–1986).
  - Fred Secombe, 98, Church in Wales priest and writer.
  - Sir Alan Urwick, 86, diplomat and public servant, Ambassador to Egypt (1985–1987), High Commissioner to Canada (1987–1989), Serjeant-at-Arms of the House of Commons (1989–1995).
- 10 December
  - Peter Brabrook, 79, footballer.
  - A. A. Gill, 62, writer and restaurant critic (The Sunday Times).
  - Ian McCaskill, 78, television weatherman and meteorologist.
  - Tommy McCulloch, 82, footballer (Clyde).
- 11 December
  - Valerie Gell, 71, singer and guitarist (The Liverbirds).
  - Charlie McNeil, 53, footballer (Stirling Albion).
  - John Moffat, 97, Royal Navy pilot during the Second World War and veteran of the sinking of the Bismarck.
  - Michael Nicholson, 79, journalist and war correspondent.
- 12 December
  - Mark Fisher, 57, pop musician (Matt Bianco).
  - Gustav Jahoda, 96, psychologist.
  - Jim Prior, Baron Prior, 89, politician, Secretary of State for Northern Ireland (1981–1984) and Employment (1979–1981).
  - Walter Swinburn, 55, jockey.
- 14 December
  - Bernard Fox, 89, actor (Bewitched, Titanic, The Mummy).
  - Sir Dudley Smith, 90, politician, MP for Brentford and Chiswick (1959–1966) and Warwick and Leamington (1968–1997).
  - Jeremy Summers, 85, film and television director.
- 15 December
  - Albert Bennett, 72, footballer (Rotherham United, Newcastle United, Norwich City).
  - Dave Shepherd, 87, jazz clarinetist.
- 18 December
  - Rachel Owen, 48, academic and printmaker.
  - Jack V. Lunzer, 92, industrial diamond merchant and museum curator (Valmadonna Trust Library).
- 19 December
  - Lionel Blue, 86, rabbi, journalist and broadcaster.
  - Annette Karmiloff-Smith, 78, neuroscientist.
  - Sir John Oakeley, 8th Baronet, 84, Olympic yachtsman (1972).
  - Christopher Young, 71, rugby league player (Hull Kingston Rovers, Great Britain).
- 20 December
  - Patrick Jenkin, Baron Jenkin of Roding, 90, politician, Secretary of State for Social Services (1979–1981), Industry (1981–1983), and Environment (1983–1985).
  - Dame Frances Patterson, 62, judge.
- 21 December
  - Deddie Davies, 78, actress (The Railway Children, Stella) and musician (The Zimmers).
  - John Gwilliam, 93, rugby union player (Wales).
  - Bob Jeffery, 81, Anglican priest, Dean of Worcester (1987–1996).
  - Nigel Nicholls, 78, civil servant, Clerk of the Privy Council (1992–1998).
- 22 December
  - John Buckingham, 76, jockey.
  - Philip Saville, 86, actor, television director and screenwriter.
- 23 December
  - John Aitchison, 90, statistician.
  - Robert Hinde, 93, zoologist, Master of St John's College, Cambridge (1989–1994).
  - Piers Sellers, 61, astronaut and meteorologist.
  - George Thompson, 88, politician, MP for Galloway (1974–1979).
- 24 December
  - Richard Adams, 96, author (Watership Down, The Plague Dogs, Shardik).
  - Rick Parfitt, 68, singer, songwriter and guitarist (Status Quo).
  - Liz Smith, 95, actress (The Royle Family, I Didn't Know You Cared, Charlie and the Chocolate Factory).
- 25 December
  - Lady Marion Fraser, 84, music educator.
  - John Sedgwick Gregson, 92, George Cross recipient.
  - George Michael, 53, singer (Wham!) and songwriter ("Careless Whisper", "Last Christmas", "Faith").
  - John Nike, 81, businessman.
- 26 December – Mary Wondrausch, 93, artist and potter.
- 29 December
  - Matt Carragher, 40, footballer (Wigan, Port Vale).
  - John Kelly, 84, boxer.
  - Norman Rimmington, 93, footballer (Hartlepool, Barnsley).
- 30 December
  - Allan Williams, 86, businessman and promoter (The Beatles).
  - Tommy Wisbey, 86, criminal, participant in the Great Train Robbery.
- 31 December – Sir Dennis Faulkner, 90, officer in the Royal Navy.

== See also ==
- 2016 in British music
- 2016 in British radio
- 2016 in British television
- List of British films of 2016
