= Deaths in April 2016 =

The following is a list of notable deaths in April 2016.

Entries for each day are listed alphabetically by surname. A typical entry lists information in the following sequence:

- Name, age, country of citizenship and reason for notability, established cause of death, reference.

== April 2016 ==
=== 1 ===
- Karl-Robert Ameln, 96, Swedish sailor (1948 and 1952 Olympics).
- Aleksander Arkuszyński, 98, Polish brigadier general, WWII veteran.
- Pratyusha Banerjee, 24, Indian actress, suicide by hanging.
- Alan Carter, 86, British civil servant, Director of Immigration of Hong Kong (1983–1989).
- Tom Coughlin, 67, American business executive and convicted fraudster (Walmart).
- George Curry, 71, American football coach, amyotrophic lateral sclerosis.
- Mame Younousse Dieng, 76, Senegalese writer.
- Alberto Fontanesi, 87, Italian footballer.
- Artur Górski, 46, Polish politician, member of Sejm (since 2005), leukemia.
- Kao Ching-yuen, 87, Taiwanese businessman (Uni-President Enterprises Corporation). (death announced on this date)
- Richard S. Kem, 89, American army Major-General.
- Emil Keres, 90, Hungarian actor and theatre director.
- Clarence Makwetu, 88, South African politician.
- Herbert Theodore Milburn, 84, American judge.
- John Minney, 76, English cricketer (Cambridge University, Northamptonshire).
- Wiebe Nijenhuis, 61, Dutch sportsman.
- Carl Nordling, 85, Swedish physicist.
- Constance-Anne Parker, 94, British sculptor.
- Marjorie Peters, 97, American baseball player (AAGBPL).
- Geoff Portz, 85, British professional wrestler.
- Fausto Puccini, 83, Italian Olympic equestrian.
- Patricia Thompson, 89, American philosopher.
- André Villers, 85, French photographer.
- Tony Whittaker, 83, British solicitor and politician.
- Ron Wicks, 76, Canadian NHL ice hockey referee, liver cancer.

=== 2 ===
- Gato Barbieri, 83, Argentine jazz saxophonist, pneumonia.
- Rick Bartow, 69, American artist, heart failure.
- Don Beery, 96, American basketball player.
- Moreese Bickham, 98, American convicted murderer and anti-death penalty activist.
- Sergio Ferrari, 72, Italian footballer.
- Gallieno Ferri, 87, Italian comic book artist (Zagor, Mister No).
- Rona M. Fields, 83, American psychologist.
- Boris Hybner, 74, Czech actor and mime artist.
- Gareth Jones, 85, British legal academic.
- Martin Lampkin, 65, English motorcycle trials rider, cancer.
- Nabil Nosair, 77, Egyptian footballer (Zamalek).
- Amber Rayne, 31, American pornographic actress, accidental drug overdose.
- Dennis Riggin, 79, Canadian ice hockey player (Detroit Red Wings).
- László Sárosi, 84, Hungarian football player and coach.
- Aleksandar Vasin, 82, Serbian Olympic fencer.
- Thomas Zeng Jing-mu, 95, Chinese clandestine Roman Catholic prelate, Bishop of Yujiang (1988–2012).
- Soldiers killed in the Armenian–Azerbaijani clashes:
  - Robert Abajyan, 19, Armenian (Nagorno-Karabakh Defense Army).
  - Samid Imanov, 34–35, Azerbaijani (Special Forces).
  - Samir Kachayev, 22, Azerbaijani.
  - Murad Mirzayev, 40, Azerbaijani (Special Forces).
  - Kyaram Sloyan, 19, Armenian (Nagorno-Karabakh Defense Army).

=== 3 ===
- Abu Firas al-Suri, 65, Syrian al-Nusra Front senior official, air strike.
- Phanor Arizabaleta-Arzayus, 78, Colombian criminal, heart attack.
- John C. Baldwin, 67, American cardiac surgeon, drowned.
- John Vane, 11th Baron Barnard, 92, British peer.
- Erik Bauersfeld, 93, American radio dramatist (KPFA) and voice actor (Star Wars, A.I. Artificial Intelligence, Crimson Peak).
- Jesse L. Cooksey, 83, American politician.
- Ward Crutchfield, 87, American politician, member of the Tennessee Senate (1985–2007).
- Bob Ellis, 73, Australian writer (Newsfront, My First Wife) and journalist, liver cancer.
- Bas van Erp, 36, Dutch wheelchair tennis player, Paralympic bronze medalist (2004).
- Leopoldo Flores, 82, Mexican artist.
- Don Francks, 84, Canadian jazz vocalist and actor (La Femme Nikita, Inspector Gadget, I'm Not There), lung cancer.
- Robert Guinan, 82, American painter, lymphoma.
- Lars Gustafsson, 79, Swedish writer and scholar.
- Rowley Habib, 82, New Zealand writer.
- Henry Harpending, 72, American anthropologist, stroke.
- Bill Henderson, 90, American jazz vocalist and actor (Clue, City Slickers, White Men Can't Jump), cancer.
- Dick Hodgins Jr., 84, American cartoonist.
- Ross Honsberger, 87, Canadian mathematician.
- Stephen Jacobsen, 75, American bioengineer.
- Alex de Jesús, 33, Puerto Rican professional and Olympic lightweight boxer (2004), shot.
- Cesare Maldini, 84, Italian football player and manager.
- Joe Medicine Crow, 102, American Crow historian.
- Ronald Mulkearns, 85, Australian Roman Catholic prelate, Bishop of Ballarat (1971–1997), colon cancer.
- Don Narrell, 87, American football player (Edmonton Eskimos).
- Whai Ngata, 74, New Zealand Māori broadcaster, journalist and lexicographer.
- Noh Jin-kyu, 23, South Korean short track speed skater, world champion (2011, 2012), osteosarcoma.
- Lola Novaković, 80, Serbian singer.
- Ian Robinson, 69, Zimbabwean cricket umpire, lung cancer.
- Jules Schelvis, 95, Dutch historian and Holocaust survivor.
- Kōji Wada, 42, Japanese singer ("Butter-Fly", "All of My Mind"), nasopharynx cancer.
- John Waite, 74, English footballer (Grimsby Town).
- Clarence Clifton Young, 93, American politician, member of the United States House of Representatives from Nevada's at-large congressional district (1953–1957), Nevada Senate (1966–1980) and Supreme Court (1985–2002).

=== 4 ===
- Ranjan Baindoor, 66, Indian cricketer.
- Jarle Bondevik, 81, Norwegian philologist.
- Archie Dees, 80, American basketball player (Cincinnati Royals, Detroit Pistons).
- Eric Dott, 89, American game designer.
- Aubrey Finlay, 78, Irish cricketer.
- Georgi Hristakiev, 71, Bulgarian footballer, Olympic silver medalist (1968).
- Shahidul Islam Khokon, 59, Bangladeshi filmmaker, motor neuron disease.
- Doug Kraner, 65, American production designer (Uncle Buck, Lean on Me, Miracle on 34th Street), cancer.
- Rita Lafontaine, 76, Canadian actress, complications following surgery.
- Chus Lampreave, 85, Spanish actress (Belle Époque, Volver).
- Carlo Mastrangelo, 78, American bassist and doo-wop singer (The Belmonts).
- Getatchew Mekurya, 81, Ethiopian jazz saxophonist.
- John Miller, 68, American politician, member of the Virginia Senate (since 2008).
- Royston Nash, 82, English conductor (D'Oyly Carte Opera Company).
- George Radosevich, 88, American football player (Baltimore Colts).
- Mike Sandlock, 100, American baseball player (Brooklyn Dodgers).
- Abe Segal, 85, South African tennis player, cancer.
- Song Soo-kwon, 76, South Korean writer.
- Ted Toles Jr., 90, American baseball player.
- Geoff Vanderfeen, 86, Australian rules footballer (Footscray).
- Ken Waterhouse, 86, English footballer (Preston North End, Rotherham United).

=== 5 ===
- Monica Asman, 95, American nun and research scientist.
- John Carlson, 82, American sportscaster.
- Richard G. Dupont, 72, American politician.
- Michael Earls-Davis, 95, English cricketer.
- Zyta Gilowska, 66, Polish politician, Minister of Finance (2006, 2007), Deputy Prime Minister (2006, 2007).
- Roman Gribbs, 90, American politician, Mayor of Detroit (1970–1974).
- Leon Haywood, 74, American funk and soul singer.
- Ed Johnson, 71, American basketball player.
- Koço Kasapoğlu, 80, Turkish footballer.
- George Gelaga King, Sierra Leonean judge.
- Zena Latto, 90, American jazz saxophonist.
- Kerrie Lester, 62, Australian painter, leukaemia.
- Elsie Morison, 91, Australian soprano.
- E. M. Nathanson, 88, American author (The Dirty Dozen), heart failure.
- Cornel Patrichi, 72, Romanian ballet dancer, choreographer and actor, lung cancer.
- Mick Sullivan, 82, English rugby league footballer (Wigan), world champion (1954, 1960).
- Ahmed Refai Taha, 61, Egyptian terrorist, leader of al-Gama'a al-Islamiyya, air strike.
- Barbara Turner, 79, American actress (Soldier Blue) and screenwriter (Pollock, The Company).
- Frank Wainright, 48, American football player (Miami Dolphins, Baltimore Ravens), NFL champion (2000).

=== 6 ===
- Orison Rudolph Aggrey, 89, American diplomat, Ambassador to the Gambia (1973–1977), Senegal (1973–1977) and Romania (1977–1981).
- Joe Freeman Britt, 80, American attorney and death penalty advocate.
- Marjorie V. Butcher, 90, American mathematician.
- Dennis Davis, 64, American drummer (David Bowie, Stevie Wonder), cancer.
- Jaime Pedro Gonçalves, 79, Mozambican Roman Catholic prelate, Archbishop of Beira (1976–2012).
- Adrian Greenwood, 42, British art dealer and author, stabbed.
- Merle Haggard, 79, American singer-songwriter ("Okie from Muskogee", "The Fightin' Side of Me", "Carolyn"), Grammy winner (1984, 1998, 1999), complications from pneumonia.
- Darrell Hogan, 89, American football player (Pittsburgh Steelers).
- Wolfgang Horak, 63, German Olympic rower.
- Bernd Hoss, 76, German football manager.
- Garry Jones, 65, English footballer (Bolton Wanderers).
- Esa Kervinen, 86, Finnish Olympic sport shooter.
- Joel Kurtzman, 68, American economist, cancer.
- Robert MacCrate, 94, American lawyer, President of the American Bar Association (1987–1988).
- Tomohiro Osawa, 47, Japanese Olympic sprinter.
- Ogden Mills Phipps, 75, American horse breeder.
- Norm Rowe, 90, Canadian Olympic rower.
- Prasan Suvannasith, 82, Thai Olympic footballer.
- Sherwyn Thorson, 75, American football player (Winnipeg Blue Bombers).
- Josef Toms, 94, Czech Olympic basketball player.
- Pablo Lucio Vasquez, 38, American convicted murderer, execution by lethal injection.
- Murray Wier, 89, American basketball player (Tri-Cities Blackhawks, Waterloo Hawks).

=== 7 ===
- László Bárczay, 80, Hungarian chess Grandmaster (FIDE, ICCF).
- Freda Briggs, 85, English-born Australian professor and child protection expert, Senior Australian of the Year (2000).
- A. V. Christie, 53, American poet, breast cancer.
- Frank E. Denholm, 92, American politician, member of the United States House of Representatives from South Dakota's 1st congressional district (1971–1975).
- Marcel Dubé, 86, Canadian playwright.
- Hendrikje Fitz, 54, German actress (In aller Freundschaft), cancer.
- Theodore van Houten, 63, Dutch–British author and journalist.
- John J. Johnson, 89, American politician.
- Vladimir Kagan, 88, American furniture designer.
- Cyril Edel Leonoff, 91, Canadian civil engineer and historian.
- Harry Mazer, 90, American author.
- Carlo Monti, 96, Italian athlete, Olympic bronze medalist (1948).
- Blackjack Mulligan, 73, American professional wrestler (WWWF, JCP, CWF).
- Barbara Sosgórnik, 81, Polish Olympic hurdler.
- Charles Thomas, 87, British archaeologist.
- Jimmie Van Zant, 59, American singer, songwriter and guitarist, liver cancer.
- Chuck Waseleski, 61, American baseball statistician (Boston Red Sox).
- Ruth Westbrook, 85, English cricket player and coach (national team).
- Sir John Yocklunn, 82, Australian–Papua New Guinean librarian and government advisor.

=== 8 ===
- Nicolas Abu Samah, 76–77, Lebanese actor and director.
- Dick Alban, 87, American football player (Washington Redskins, Pittsburgh Steelers).
- Mircea Albulescu, 81, Romanian actor and writer, heart failure.
- Harry Apted, 90, Fijian cricketer.
- Victoria Chitepo, 88, Zimbabwean politician.
- Anatol Ciobanu, 81, Moldovan linguist, writer and university professor.
- Richard D. Dean, 86, American brigadier general.
- David Dore, 75, Canadian figure skating competitor, judge and official, President (1980–1984) and Director General (1986–2004) of the CFSA.
- Phoebus Dhrymes, 82, American economist.
- Doug France, 62, American football player (Los Angeles Rams).
- Paul Fung Jr., 93, American cartoonist (Blondie).
- Mildred Gordon, 92, British politician, MP for Bow and Poplar (1987–1997).
- William Hamilton, 76, American cartoonist, traffic collision.
- Jack Hammer, 90, American musician and songwriter ("Great Balls of Fire").
- Charles Hirsch, 79, American forensic pathologist.
- Mimi Hirsh, 68, American author.
- Julien Hoferlin, 49, Belgian tennis coach (national team), cancer.
- George Ilsley, 88, Australian rules footballer (Carlton).
- Grace Lotowycz, 99, American botanist.
- Fred Middleton, 85, English footballer (Lincoln City).
- Elizabeth Roemer, 87, American astronomer.
- Erich Rudorffer, 98, German Luftwaffe fighter ace during World War II.
- Gene Salvay, 96, American aircraft engineer.
- Manouchehr Sotodeh, 102, Iranian geographer.
- David Swift, 85, British actor (Drop the Dead Donkey).
- Mehmetbulent Torpil, 50, Turkish Olympic sport shooter.
- Wei Chueh, 88, Taiwanese Buddhist monk, founder of the Chung Tai Shan.
- Nigel Paulet, 18th Marquess of Winchester, 74, British peer, member of the House of Lords (1968–1999).

=== 9 ===
- Frederic W. Allen, 89, American judge.
- Arthur Anderson, 93, American actor (Courage the Cowardly Dog, Midnight Cowboy), voice of Lucky Charms leprechaun.
- Frank Baron, 93, Dominican politician.
- Paul E. Bierley, 90, American music historian.
- Duane Clarridge, 83, American CIA official, complications from esophageal cancer.
- Tony Conrad, 76, American avant-garde musician, composer, video artist and professor (University at Buffalo), pneumonia.
- Juris Ekmanis, 74, Latvian academic, President of Latvian Academy of Sciences (2004–2012).
- Finn Hodt, 96, Norwegian Olympic speed skating competitor (1956) and coach.
- J. Vinton Lawrence, 76, American CIA paramilitary officer, acute myeloid leukemia.
- Bea Maddock, 81, Australian artist.
- Lucas Martínez Lara, 70, Mexican Roman Catholic prelate, Bishop of Matehuala (since 2006).
- Patrick J. O'Donnell, 68, Scottish academic.
- Martin Roberts, 48, English rugby union player (Gloucester Rugby).
- Derrick Rochester, 76, Jamaican politician and trade unionist, MP for South East St Elizabeth (1972–1980, 1989–2002), member of the Senate (1980–1983).
- Harriet Shorr, 76, American artist and writer.
- Will Smith, 34, American football player (New Orleans Saints), Super Bowl champion (2010), shot.

=== 10 ===
- Connie M. Borror, 49, American statistician and industrial engineer.
- Alec Crikis, 71, Australian Olympic sports shooter.
- John Ferrone, 91, American book editor (The Color Purple), complications from Parkinson's disease.
- Louis Gladstone, 88, American politician.
- Nicholas Hood, 92, American politician and civil rights activist, Detroit City Councilman (1965–1993).
- Irene Maguire, 86, American figure skater, heart failure.
- Jesse Mann, 93, American philosopher.
- Howard Marks, 70, Welsh cannabis smuggler, writer and legalisation campaigner, colorectal cancer.
- Thomas Kwaku Mensah, 81, Ghanaian Roman Catholic prelate, Bishop of Obuasi (1995–2008) and Archbishop of Kumasi (2008–2012).
- Wayne Southwick, 93, American surgeon and academic.
- Henryk Średnicki, 61, Polish Olympic boxer (1976, 1980), amateur World Champion (1978).
- N. H. Wadia, 91, Indian neurologist.

=== 11 ===
- Tony Ayers, 82, Australian public servant.
- Helen Bailey, 51, British author, suffocated.
- Doug Banks, 57, American radio personality (The Doug Banks Radio Show), diabetes.
- Elsie Charles Basque, 99, Canadian Mi’kmaq educator.
- João Carvalho, 28, Portuguese mixed martial arts fighter, injuries sustained in match.
- Suzanne Clauser, 86, American television writer (Bonanza).
- Albert Filozov, 78, Russian actor.
- Emile Ford, 78, Saint Lucian singer ("What Do You Want to Make Those Eyes at Me For?") and sound engineer.
- Hokie Gajan, 56, American football player and broadcaster (New Orleans Saints), liposarcoma.
- Mohsen Gheytaslou, 25–26, Iranian soldier (65th Airborne Special Forces Brigade).
- Ruth Gilbert, 99, New Zealand poet.
- Yura Halim, 92, Bruneian politician, Chief Minister (1967–1972) and lyricist (national anthem).
- Anne Gould Hauberg, 98, American arts patron, founder of the Pilchuck Glass School.
- Alan Hurd, 78, English cricketer.
- Peter J. Jannetta, 84, American neurosurgeon (Allegheny General Hospital).
- Dame Marion Kettlewell, 102, British naval officer, Director of the Wrens (1966–1970).
- Huntly D. Millar, 88, Canadian medical technology executive.
- Miss Shangay Lily, 53, Spanish drag queen, pancreatic cancer.
- Édgar Perea, 81, Colombian politician and football commentator.
- Steve Quinn, 64, British rugby league player (York, Featherstone Rovers).
- Richard Ransom, 96, American businessman (Hickory Farms).
- Ed Snider, 83, American sports executive (Comcast Spectacor, Philadelphia Flyers, Philadelphia 76ers), bladder cancer.
- A. R. Surendran, Sri Lankan lawyer, President's Counsel (2004).
- Bounama Touré, 63, Senegalese Olympic wrestler.

=== 12 ===
- Ruthven Blackburn, 102, Australian physician.
- James Bond, 70, Australian navy officer.
- Aquilino Bonfanti, 73, Italian footballer.
- Robbie Brennan, 68–69, Irish musician (Skid Row, Auto Da Fé, Grand Slam).
- Hector A. Cafferata Jr., 86, American soldier, Medal of Honor recipient.
- Paul Carey, 88, American radio broadcaster (Detroit Tigers), chronic obstructive pulmonary disease.
- Gianroberto Casaleggio, 61, Italian entrepreneur, co-founder of Five Star Movement.
- Pedro de Felipe, 71, Spanish footballer (Real Madrid, Espanyol).
- David Gest, 62, American TV producer (Michael Jackson: 30th Anniversary Special) and reality show contestant (I'm a Celebrity...Get Me Out of Here!, Celebrity Big Brother UK), stroke.
- Gib Guilbeau, 78, American musician (The Flying Burrito Brothers) and composer (Boxcar Bertha).
- Anne Jackson, 90, American actress (The Shining, Folks!, Dirty Dingus Magee).
- Bryce Jordan, 91, American academic administrator, President of the Pennsylvania State University (1983–1990).
- Alexander Kanengoni, 65, Zimbabwean writer, heart failure.
- Alan Loveday, 88, New Zealand-born British violinist (Royal Philharmonic Orchestra, Academy of St Martin in the Fields).
- Balls Mahoney, 44, American professional wrestler (ECW, WWE, SMW), heart attack.
- André Mayamba Mabuti Kathongo, 85, Congolese Roman Catholic prelate, Bishop of Popokabaka (1979–1993).
- Tōru Ōhira, 86, Japanese voice actor (Super Sentai, One Piece).
- Tibor Ordina, 45, Hungarian Olympic track and field athlete (1996), brain cancer.
- Tomaž Pandur, 53, Slovenian theatre director.
- Vagn Peitersen, 91, Danish Olympic field hockey player.
- Spec Richardson, 93, American baseball executive (Houston Astros).
- Agha Saleem, 81, Pakistani writer.
- Sir Arnold Wesker, 83, British playwright.
- Said Zahari, 88, Singaporean journalist and political prisoner.

=== 13 ===
- Srinivas Aravamudan, 54, Indian-born British academic.
- Márton Balázs, 86, Romanian mathematician.
- Jackie Carter, 62, American children's author, lymphoma.
- Julio García Espinosa, 89, Cuban film director and screenwriter (The Adventures of Juan Quin Quin).
- Nuri Gezerdaa, 56, Abkhaz politician.
- Kurtis Haiu, 31, New Zealand rugby union player (Auckland, Blues), bone cancer.
- Earl B. Hunt, 83, American psychologist.
- Matthias Joseph Isuja, 86, Tanzanian Roman Catholic prelate, Bishop of Dodoma (1972–2005).
- Lyle Jones, 92, American psychologist.
- Robert W. Lundeen, 94, American executive (Tektronix).
- Mariano Mores, 98, Argentine tango composer and pianist.
- Eeti Nieminen, 89, Finnish Olympic Nordic skier (1952).
- Rex Patterson, 89, Australian politician, MP for Dawson (1966–1975).
- Jock Scot, 63, Scottish poet and recording artist, cancer.
- Manouchehr Sotoudeh, 102, Iranian geographer and scholar of Persian literature, lung infection.
- Jeremy Steig, 73, American jazz flutist.
- Gareth Thomas, 71, Welsh actor (Blake's 7, Children of the Stones, Star Maidens), heart failure.
- Gwyn Thomas, 79, Welsh poet and academic, National Poet (2006–2008).
- Ray Thornton, 87, American attorney and politician, member of the United States House of Representatives from Arkansas's 4th and 2nd congressional districts (1973–1979, 1991–1997).
- Nera White, 80, American Hall of Fame basketball player.
- Bernard B. Wolfe, 101, American politician, member of the Illinois House of Representatives (1965–1974).
- Pete Yellin, 74, American jazz saxophonist and educator.
- Sayed Zayan, 72, Egyptian actor.

=== 14 ===
- Nguyễn Ánh 9, 76, Vietnamese songwriter and pianist.
- Ahmed Brahim, 69, Tunisian politician.
- David Collischon, 78, British executive (Filofax).
- Rada Dyson-Hudson, 85, American anthropologist.
- Martin Fitzmaurice, 75, English darts personality.
- Gaetano Gagliano, 98, Canadian entrepreneur.
- Francesco Guarraci, 61, Italian-born American mobster.
- Hector Hatch, 80, Fijian boxer (1956 Olympics), politician and civil servant.
- Fred Hayman, 90, Swiss-born American fashion retailer (Giorgio Beverly Hills) and entrepreneur, helped develop Rodeo Drive.
- Mary Holda, 100, American baseball player (South Bend Blue Sox).
- James W. Huston, 62, American author and lawyer.
- Dan Ireland, 57, Canadian-born American film producer and director (Jolene, The Whole Wide World, Mrs. Palfrey at the Claremont).
- Ilija Ivezić, 89, Croatian film actor (Last of the Renegades, The Golden Years, Marshal Tito's Spirit).
- Colin Knight, 81, New Zealand educationalist, principal of Christchurch Teachers' College (1986–1995).
- Liang Sili, 91, Chinese missile control scientist and academician (Chinese Academy of Sciences), vice-president of the International Astronautical Federation.
- Sir David MacKay, 48, British author, physicist and professor (University of Cambridge), stomach cancer.
- Rod Reyes, 80, Filipino broadcast executive and journalist (The Standard), heart failure.
- Phil Sayer, 62, British voice artist, oesophageal cancer.
- Malick Sidibé, 80, Malian photographer.
- Xu Caidong, 97, Chinese metallurgist and academician (Chinese Academy of Sciences), vice-governor of Guizhou.
- Ron Theobald, 72, American baseball player (Milwaukee Brewers).
- Carl M. Vogel, 61, American politician, member of the Missouri Senate (2003–2011), pancreatic cancer.

=== 15 ===
- Orville Gilbert Brim Jr., 93, American social psychologist.
- Anne Grommerch, 45, French politician, member of the National Assembly (since 2008), Mayor of Thionville (since 2014), breast cancer.
- Janet Hodgson, 56, English artist and filmmaker, cancer.
- Peter Janson-Smith, 93, British literary agent (Ian Fleming).
- Byrle Klinck, 81, Canadian Olympic ice hockey player, bronze medallist (1956).
- Laura Liu, 49, American state judge, Cook County Circuit Court judge (2010–2014), Illinois Appellate Court judge (since 2014), breast cancer.
- Frederick Mayer, 94, German-born American spy (OSS).
- Derek Mayers, 81, English footballer (Preston North End).
- A. A. Raiba, 94, Indian painter.
- Harold Shillinglaw, 88, Australian football player and cricketer.
- Morag Siller, 46, British actress (Emmerdale, Memphis Belle, Casualty), breast cancer.
- Richard Smith, 84, British painter, heart failure.
- Lars-Inge Svartenbrandt, 70, Swedish criminal, apartment fire.
- Louis Van Geyt, 88, Belgian politician, chairman of Communist Party of Belgium (1972–1989).
- Guy Woolfenden, 78, English composer and conductor.

=== 16 ===
- Tom Benavidez, 77, American politician.
- Ron Bonham, 73, American basketball player (Boston Celtics, Indiana Pacers), NBA champion (1965, 1966).
- Jeanette Bonnier, 82, Swedish media proprietor (Bonnier Group), journalist (Expressen) and author.
- David R. Brown, 93, American computer scientist.
- Miloud Chaabi, 86, Moroccan businessman.
- Clare Crockett, 33, Northern Irish nun, earthquake.
- Rod Daniel, 73, American film director (Teen Wolf, K-9, Beethoven's 2nd), Parkinson's disease.
- Donald B. Easum, 92, American diplomat.
- William M. Gray, 86, American meteorologist.
- Guan Guangfu, 84, Chinese politician, Communist Party Chief of Hubei.
- Bernhard Hassenstein, 93, German biologist and behaviorist.
- Charlie Hodge, 82, Canadian ice hockey player (Montreal Canadiens, Vancouver Canucks) and scout.
- Clarence James, 84, Bermudian politician, Deputy Premier (1983–1989).
- Maurice Kenny, 86, American poet, heart ailment and kidney failure.
- Rubén Mendoza Ayala, 55, Mexican politician.
- Nathanael Orr, 98, Australian politician, member of the New South Wales Legislative Council (1976–1984).
- U Pandita, 94, Burmese Buddhist monk and meditation teacher.
- Louis Pilot, 75, Luxembourgish football player (Fola Esch, Standard Liège, Royal Antwerp) and manager (national team).
- Ilias Polatidis, 50, Greek politician.
- Ismael Quintana, 78, Puerto Rican singer and composer.
- Peter Rock, 70, Austrian-born Chilean rock musician.
- Helmut Rohde, 90, German politician.
- Kit West, 79, British special effects artist (Raiders of the Lost Ark, Dragonheart, Enemy at the Gates), Oscar winner (1982).

=== 17 ===
- Ken Aldred, 70, Australian politician, MP for Henty (1975–1980), Bruce (1983–1990) and Deakin (1990–1996).
- Tiga Bayles, 62, Australian radio presenter and indigenous rights activist, cancer.
- Kong Bunchhoeun, 77, Cambodian author and songwriter, cancer.
- Bettye Caldwell, 91, American educator (University of Arkansas at Little Rock) and child-development campaigner (NAEYC).
- Bob Charles, 79, American-born Australian politician, MP for La Trobe (1990–2004).
- Chyna, 46, American professional wrestler (WWF) and actress (1 Night in China, 3rd Rock from the Sun, Cougar Club), mixed drug intoxication.
- William A. Enemark, 102, American major general.
- Clifton C. Garvin, 94, American businessman, CEO of Exxon (1975–1986).
- Luis Horacio Gomez González, 57, Colombian Roman Catholic prelate, Vicar Apostolic of Puerto Gaitán (2014–2016).
- Anthony Keane, 87, American Olympic fencer (1968).
- Toshiro Konishi, 63, Japanese-born Peruvian chef, pioneer of Japanese cuisine in Lima, cancer.
- Bruce Mansfield, 71, Australian radio and television personality, prostate cancer.
- Scott Nimerfro, 54, American television writer and producer (Hannibal, Once Upon a Time, Pushing Daisies), angiosarcoma.
- John R. Norton III, 87, American politician.
- Constantine Papastephanou, 92, Syrian Eastern Orthodox prelate, Metropolitan of Baghdad and Kuwait (1969-2014).
- Tyler Richards, 29, Canadian basketball player, shot.
- Doris Roberts, 90, American actress (Everybody Loves Raymond, Remington Steele, National Lampoon's Christmas Vacation), five-time Emmy winner, stroke.
- Trần Phước Thọ, 23, Vietnamese footballer (Long An, U23 national team), traffic collision.
- Nicolas Tikhomiroff, 89, French photographer.
- Yang Hongxun, 84, Chinese architect, architectural historian, and archaeologist.

=== 18 ===
- Brian Asawa, 49, American opera singer, heart failure.
- Paul Busiek, 93, American politician.
- Yuri Bychkov, 84, Russian art historian.
- William Campbell, 75, American business executive (Apple) and college football coach (Columbia University), cancer.
- Adrian Berry, 4th Viscount Camrose, 78, British journalist.
- Robert Christophe, 78, French Olympic swimmer (1956, 1960, 1964), European champion (1958, 1962).
- Barry Davies, 71, British soldier and author, heart attack.
- Rubén Héctor di Monte, 84, Argentinian Roman Catholic prelate, Archbishop of Mercedes-Luján (2000–2007).
- Marwan Dudin, 79–80, Jordanian politician, Minister of Agriculture (1980–1984) and Minister of State for the Occupied Territory Affairs (1986–1988).
- Mikhail Farikh, 56, Russian helicopter pilot, helicopter crash.
- Hugh Faulkner, 83, Canadian politician, MP for Peterborough (1965–1979), complications from surgery.
- Ben-Zion Gold, 92, Polish-born American rabbi.
- Cox Habbema, 72, Dutch actress, theater director and manager.
- Eva Henning, 95, Swedish stage and movie actress.
- Fritz Herkenrath, 87, German footballer (Rot-Weiss Essen).
- Karina Huff, 55, British actress (The House of Clocks, Time for Loving, Voices from Beyond) and television personality, breast cancer.
- Proverb Jacobs, 80, American football player (Philadelphia Eagles, New York Giants).
- Sir John Leslie, 4th Baronet, 99, Anglo-Irish aristocrat and media personality.
- Larry Loyie, 82, Canadian Cree author and playwright.
- Arnulfo Mejía Rojas, 59, Mexican architect and Catholic priest.
- Johan van Minnen, 83, Dutch journalist and politician, member of the European Parliament (1979–1984).
- Daniel Moore, 75, American poet, cancer.
- Vladimir Nemukhin, 90, Russian painter (Bulldozer Exhibition).
- Charles J. Pilliod Jr., 97, American business executive and diplomat, Ambassador to Mexico (1986–1989).
- Guy Prather, 58, American football player (Green Bay Packers), cancer.
- Fulvio Roiter, 89, Italian photographer, Prix Nadar winner (1956).
- Guy Rouxel, 90, French footballer.
- Pál Sajgó, 93, Hungarian cross country skier and biathlete.
- Gert Schramm, 87, German Holocaust survivor.
- Zoltán Szarka, 73, Hungarian football player and coach, Olympic champion (1968).
- Tao Siju, 81, Chinese politician, minister of Public Security.
- John Zemanek, 94, American architect.

=== 19 ===
- Gerasimos Arsenis, 84, Greek politician, Minister for National Defense (1993–1996) and National Education and Religious Affairs (1996–2000).
- William Ávila, 59, Costa Rican footballer.
- Patricio Aylwin, 97, Chilean politician, President (1990–1994).
- Estelle Balet, 21, Swiss snowboarder, world champion (2015, 2016), avalanche.
- Dud Beattie, 81, Australian rugby league footballer and selector (Queensland).
- Errikos Belies, 66, Greek translator and poet.
- Moysés Blás, 79, Brazilian Olympic basketball player.
- Dorothy R. Burnley, 89, American politician, member of the North Carolina General Assembly (1980–1984).
- Eloy Casados, 66, American actor (Ishi: The Last of His Tribe, Walker, Texas Ranger).
- Russell Dove, 87, Australian Olympic sports shooter (1972).
- Harry Elderfield, 72, British geochemist and professor (University of Cambridge).
- Ronit Elkabetz, 51, Israeli actress and film director (Gett: The Trial of Viviane Amsalem), lung cancer.
- Solveig Ericsson, 84, Swedish Olympic athlete.
- Karl-Heinz von Hassel, 77, German actor.
- Walter Kohn, 93, Austrian-born American theoretical physicist, Nobel laureate (1998), jaw cancer.
- Lord Tanamo, 81, Jamaican ska and mento musician.
- John McConathy, 86, American basketball player (Milwaukee Hawks, Northwestern State).
- Mehrdad Oladi, 30, Iranian footballer (Malavan), heart attack.
- Milt Pappas, 76, American baseball player (Baltimore Orioles, Cincinnati Reds, Chicago Cubs).
- Billy Redmayne, 25, Manx motorcycle racer, race collision.
- Igor Volchok, 84, Russian football manager.
- Pete Zorn, 65, American musician (Steeleye Span, Richard Thompson, The Albion Band), cancer.

=== 20 ===
- Solomon Blatt Jr., 94, American federal judge, U.S. District Court for South Carolina (since 1971).
- Cynthia Cooke, 96, British nurse, Matron-in-Chief of the Queen Alexandra's Royal Naval Nursing Service (1973–1976).
- Velda González, 83, Puerto Rican actress and politician.
- Guy Hamilton, 93, French-born British film director (Goldfinger, Battle of Britain, Evil Under the Sun).
- Avril Henry, 81, British academic, suicide.
- Dame Leonie Kramer, 91, Australian academic, author and university administrator.
- Attila Özdemiroğlu, 73, Turkish composer, lung cancer.
- Solly Pandor, 58, Zambian football manager.
- Harry Perkowski, 93, American baseball player (Chicago Cubs, Cincinnati Reds).
- Qi Benyu, 85, Chinese politician and propagandist, cancer.
- Paul Selge, 94, American football player and coach.
- Paul Stahl, 75, Canadian Olympic sprint canoer.
- Richard Stansberry, 87, American politician.
- Jack Tafari, 69, British activist, liver failure.
- Giannis Voglis, 78, Greek actor.
- Mohamad Khadim Al Wajih, Yemeni politician.
- Dwayne Washington, 52, American basketball player (New Jersey Nets, Miami Heat, Syracuse University), brain cancer.
- Vern Wilson, 85, American Olympic athlete.
- Victoria Wood, 62, British comedian, writer and actor (Victoria Wood: As Seen on TV, dinnerladies, Housewife, 49), cancer.
- Sakumi Yoshino, 57, Japanese manga artist.
- Yu Songlie, 95, Chinese agricultural scientist, educator and academician (Chinese Academy of Engineering).

=== 21 ===
- Frederick Bruce-Lyle, 62, Ghanaian-born Saint Vincentian judge in the Caribbean.
- Valeriu Cotea, 89, Romanian oenologist, member of Romanian Academy, cardiac arrest.
- Norbert Esnault, 87, French cyclist.
- Nade Haley, 68, American artist.
- Levi Karuhanga, 60, Ugandan major general.
- Per-Simon Kildal, 64, Swedish antenna specialist.
- Irvin Kipper, 99, American bomber pilot.
- Hans Koschnick, 87, German politician and diplomat, Bremen Senate president and mayor (1967–1985), President of the Bundesrat (1970–1971, 1981–1982), MP (1987–1998).
- Marco Leto, 85, Italian film and television director (Black Holiday, Al piacere di rivederla).
- Franz Lorette, 80, Belgian Olympic hockey player.
- Lonnie Mack, 74, American singer-guitarist (The Wham of that Memphis Man).
- Toshio Mashima, 67, Japanese composer, cancer.
- D. B. Nihalsinghe, 77, Sri Lankan filmmaker (Welikathara).
- Utako Okamoto, 98, Japanese medical scientist.
- Ferenc Paragi, 62, Hungarian Olympic javelin thrower (1976, 1980), world record holder (1980–1983).
- Prince, 57, American musician ("When Doves Cry", "Little Red Corvette", "Purple Rain") and actor, Oscar (1984) and four-time Grammy winner, accidental fentanyl overdose.
- Peter Ruckman, 94, American Independent Baptist pastor.
- Smoke Glacken, 22, American Thoroughbred racehorse, winner of the Hopeful Stakes (1996).
- Dene Smuts, 66, South African politician, MP (1989–2014).
- John D. Travis, 75, American politician.
- John Walton, Baron Walton of Detchant, 93, British politician, member of the House of Lords (since 1989).

=== 22 ===
- David Beresford, 68, British journalist.
- Yvon Charbonneau, 75, Canadian politician, stroke.
- Rudolph Chimelli, 87, German journalist and author.
- Isabelle Dinoire, 49, French mauled woman, first person to undergo a partial face transplant.
- Rex Fell, 71, New Zealand Thoroughbred breeder.
- Ojārs Grīnbergs, 73, Latvian singer, lung cancer.
- Roger Khawam, 94, Egyptian antique dealer and Egyptologist.
- John Lumsden, 55, Scottish footballer (Stoke City).
- Ayah Pin, 74, Malaysian cult leader (Sky Kingdom).
- Robert Price, 83, American attorney and political campaign manager.
- Jory Prum, 41, American audio engineer and video game developer (Adaptation, The Walking Dead, Brütal Legend), traffic collision.
- Manfred Rein, 68, Austrian politician (ÖVP).
- Peter Sellers, 94, New Zealand sports broadcaster.
- Soran Singh, Pakistani politician, member of the Khyber Pakhtunkhwa Assembly (since 2013), shot.
- Sir Denys Wilkinson, 93, British nuclear physicist.
- Anne Wolden-Ræthinge, 86, Danish author and journalist.

=== 23 ===
- Ron Brace, 29, American football player (Boston College, New England Patriots), apparent heart attack.
- Alfons Van den Brande, 88, Belgian cyclist.
- Carla Braan, 54, Dutch Olympic gymnast.
- John Collins, 93, Canadian politician.
- Gerald Crosier, 82, American politician.
- Errol Crossan, 85, Canadian soccer player (Norwich City).
- Attila Ferjáncz, 69, Hungarian racing driver, Hungarian Rally champion (1976–1982, 1985, 1990).
- Patrick George, 92, English painter.
- Luis González Seara, 79, Spanish politician.
- Inge King, 100, German-born Australian sculptor.
- Vjatšeslav Kobrin, 58, Russian guitarist and songwriter.
- Tom Muecke, 52, American CFL player (Winnipeg Blue Bombers, Edmonton Eskimos), heart attack.
- Tony Munro, 52, Australian sports journalist, stroke.
- Sir Richard Parsons, 88, British diplomat, Ambassador to Hungary, Spain and Sweden.
- Jacques Perry, 94, French novelist.
- Maurice Peston, Baron Peston, 85, English economist and politician, member of the House of Lords (since 1987).
- Miguel Picazo, 89, Spanish film director, screenwriter and actor (La Tía Tula).
- John Steven Satterthwaite, 87, Australian Roman Catholic prelate, Bishop of Lismore (1971–2001).
- Bill Sevesi, 92, Tongan-born New Zealand musician.
- Madeleine Sherwood, 93, Canadian actress (Cat on a Hot Tin Roof, The Flying Nun, Sweet Bird of Youth).
- Banharn Silpa-archa, 83, Thai politician, Prime Minister (1995–1996), asthma.
- Horace Ward, 88, American judge.
- Koji Yamamoto, 64, Japanese baseball player (Yomiuri Giants, Lotte Marines).
- Paul Hisao Yasuda, 94, Japanese Roman Catholic prelate, Archbishop of Osaka (1978–1997).

=== 24 ===
- Janette Ahrens, 90, American figure skater.
- Zafar Ishaq Ansari, 84, Pakistani Islamic scholar, heart attack.
- Paul Annear, 68, New Zealand jeweller.
- Chen Shilu, 95, Chinese flight mechanic, educator and academician (Chinese Academy of Engineering).
- Manuel de la Torre, 94, Spanish-born American golf player and instructor.
- Robert Dolan, 87, American marine geologist.
- Walter Jackson Freeman III, 89, American biologist.
- Ivan Goodingham, 90, Australian rules footballer (Essendon).
- Wouter van Harselaar, 86, Dutch politician, member of the House of Representatives (1968–1971).
- Perry Hooper Sr., 91, American judge, Chief Justice of the Supreme Court of Alabama (1995–2001).
- Steve Julian, 57, American radio host (KPCC), brain cancer.
- Kiviaq, 80, Canadian lawyer, politician, boxer and football player, cancer.
- Tommy Kono, 85, American weightlifter, Olympic champion (1952, 1956), world champion (1953–1959), complications from liver disease.
- Thinle Lhondup, 72, Nepalese actor (Himalaya), fall.
- Benjamin Manglona, 78, Northern Mariana Islands politician, Lieutenant Governor (1990–1994), stroke.
- Zippy Morocco, 86, American athlete, suicide.
- Ricardo Torres Origel, 59, Mexican politician.
- Lizette Parker, 44, American politician, Mayor of Teaneck, New Jersey (since 2014), respiratory illness.
- Billy Paul, 81, American R&B singer ("Me and Mrs. Jones"), pancreatic cancer.
- George Pieterson, 74, Dutch clarinetist.
- Terry Redlin, 78, American artist, Alzheimer's disease.
- Klaus Siebert, 60, German biathlon athlete and coach, world champion (1978, 1979), Olympic silver medalist (1980).
- Papa Wemba, 66, Congolese singer, seizure.
- George Alexis Weymouth, 79, American artist and conservationist, heart failure.

=== 25 ===
- Bill Allison, 85, American actor (Casino).
- Dumitru Antonescu, 71, Romanian footballer (Farul Constanța).
- Remo Belli, 88, American drummer, developed the synthetic drumhead (Remo), complications of pneumonia.
- Joe Blahak, 65, American football player (Minnesota Vikings).
- Nicolae Esinencu, 76, Moldovan screenwriter and writer.
- Göte Gåård, 84, Swedish Olympic sports shooter.
- Mel George, 80, American professor and twice interim president of the University of Missouri.
- Martin Gray, 93, Polish Holocaust survivor and writer.
- Michal Hornstein, 95, Polish-born Canadian executive.
- Tom Lewis, 94, Australian politician, Premier of New South Wales (1975–1976).
- Patrick Fabionn Lopes, 35, Brazilian football player, brain aneurysm.
- Xulhaz Mannan, 39, Bangladeshi editor, stabbed.
- Mei Baojiu, 82, Chinese Peking opera artist, bronchospasm.
- Poornima Arvind Pakvasa, 102, Indian social worker.
- Neculai Rățoi, 77, Romanian politician, mayor of Pașcani (1981–2008).
- John Ridsdel, 68, Canadian journalist (Calgary Herald), businessman (Petro-Canada) and Abu Sayyaf hostage, beheaded.
- Horst Sachs, 89, German mathematician.
- Samantha Schubert, 47, Malaysian actress and beauty queen, Miss Malaysia (1991), pancreatic cancer.
- Rudolf Wessely, 91, Austrian actor.

=== 26 ===
- Raymond Casey, 98, British geologist and philatelist.
- Vincent Darius, 60, Grenadian Roman Catholic prelate, Bishop of Saint George's in Grenada (since 2002), pneumonia.
- John Eiseman, 90, American Olympic sprint canoer.
- Arne Elsholtz, 71, German voice actor.
- Mark Farmer, 53, British actor (Grange Hill, Minder, Johnny Jarvis), cancer.
- Winston Hill, 74, American football player (New York Jets), Super Bowl winner (1968).
- William H. Jarvis, 85, Canadian politician.
- Amanullah Khan, 82, Pakistani Kashmir separatism activist (JKLF), COPD.
- Lucy Kibaki, 82, Kenyan teacher and socialite, First Lady (2002–2013).
- Ken Maeda, 44, Japanese comedian and actor, cardiopulmonary arrest.
- M. H. Mohamed, 94, Sri Lankan politician.
- Álvaro Pérez Treviño, 85, Mexican politician.
- Peter Propping, 73, German geneticist.
- Ozzie Silna, 83, American basketball owner (Spirits of St. Louis), cancer.
- Martin Szipál, 91, Hungarian photographer, prostate cancer.
- Masako Togawa, 85, Japanese feminist, singer, actress and novelist.
- Dorothy Warburton, 80, Canadian geneticist.
- James H. Ware, 74, American biostatistician, cancer.
- Stephen Wheatcroft, 94, British economist.
- Willie L. Williams, 72, American police commissioner (Los Angeles, Philadelphia).
- Harry Wu, 79, Chinese human rights activist, founder of the Laogai Research Foundation.
- Vladimir Yulygin, 80, Russian football player and coach.

=== 27 ===
- James Arvaluk, 68, Canadian politician.
- Edward H. Burtt Jr., 68, American ornithologist.
- James Carroll, 60, American-born Canadian actor (Wind at My Back, Red Dead Redemption, Death to Smoochy), small cell lung cancer.
- Harold Cohen, 87, British computer artist (AARON).
- Angela Flanders, 88, British perfumer.
- Viktor Gavrikov, 58, Lithuanian-Swiss chess Grandmaster.
- Herta Groves, 96, Austrian-born British milliner, traffic collision.
- Ivanelle Hoe, 78, American swimmer.
- Philip Kives, 87, Canadian marketing entrepreneur, founder of K-tel.
- Julio Xavier Labayen, 89, Filipino Roman Catholic prelate, territorial prelate of Infanta (1966–2003).
- Liu Lianman, 82, Chinese mountain climber, made the first ascent of Muztagh Ata.
- Umberto Magnani, 75, Brazilian theater producer and actor (História de Amor, Cabocla, Páginas da Vida), stroke.
- Robert C. Mathis, 88, American air force general.
- Chris Parkinson, 74, New Zealand broadcaster, co-founder of Radio Hauraki.
- Ray Salazar, 85, American politician, Mayor of El Paso, Texas (1977–1979).
- Gabriele Sima, 61, Austrian opera singer.
- Toms, 87, Indian cartoonist (Boban and Molly).

=== 28 ===
- Anderson Agiru, 54, Papua New Guinean politician.
- Óscar Álvarez, 67, Argentine footballer (Panathinaikos).
- Sir Edward Ashmore, 96, British officer in the Royal Navy, First Sea Lord (1974–1977).
- Conrad Burns, 81, American politician, Senator from Montana (1989–2007).
- Enrique Cal Pardo, 93, Spanish priest, teacher and writer.
- Ed Davender, 49, American basketball player (Kentucky Wildcats).
- Jenny Diski, 68, English writer (Nothing Natural, Rainforest, London Review of Books), lung cancer.
- Joe Durham, 84, American baseball player (Baltimore Orioles, St. Louis Cardinals).
- Igor Fesunenko, 83, Russian journalist, foreign affairs writer and teacher (MGIMO).
- Charles Gatewood, 73, American photographer, suicide by jumping.
- Fredrik Grønningsæter, 92, Norwegian priest, Bishop of Sør-Hålogaland (1982–1992).
- René Hausman, 80, Belgian comic book writer and illustrator.
- Barry Howard, 78, English actor (Hi-de-Hi!), blood cancer.
- Georg Kronawitter, 88, German politician, Mayor of Munich (1972–1978, 1984–1993).
- Ingram Olkin, 91, American statistics professor, colorectal cancer.
- David Page, 55, Australian composer, musical director of Bangarra Dance Theatre.
- Mohamed Roushdi, 94, Egyptian gymnast.
- Blackie Sherrod, 96, American sportswriter.

=== 29 ===
- Tim Bacon, 52, British restaurateur and actor.
- Alyson Bailes, 67, British diplomat, Ambassador to Finland (2000–2002).
- DeCorsey E. Bolden, 91, American politician.
- Sherry Cassuto, 59, American Olympic rower.
- Chen Zhongshi, 73, Chinese writer, oral cancer.
- Jok Church, 66, American cartoonist (You Can with Beakman and Jax).
- Renato Corona, 67, Filipino jurist, Chief Justice of the Supreme Court (2010–2012), complications from a heart attack.
- Patrick Deuel, 54, American reality TV star.
- Erediauwa, 92, Nigerian traditional royal, Oba of Benin (since 1979). (death announced on this date)
- Harry Falk, 83, American television director (Three's a Crowd, The Streets of San Francisco, The Colbys).
- Bob Fitch, 76, American photojournalist.
- Sarah Gordon, 52, Irish Olympic equestrian.
- Dmytro Hnatyuk, 91, Ukrainian baritone opera singer.
- Hilarius Moa Nurak, 73, Indonesian Roman Catholic prelate, Bishop of Pangkal-Pinang (since 1987).
- Dave Robinson, 67, English footballer (Birmingham City, Walsall). (death announced on this date)
- Jigdal Dagchen Sakya, 86, Tibetan Buddhist teacher.
- Don White, 89, American stock car racing driver.
- Wojciech Zagórski, 87, Polish actor.

=== 30 ===
- Daniel Aaron, 103, American writer and academic (Harvard University), co-founder of the Library of America.
- Michael Edward Ash, 88, British brewer.
- Viktor Barinov, 77, Russian Olympic rower.
- Daniel Berrigan, 94, American Jesuit priest, poet, peace activist and ex-convict (Catonsville Nine).
- Wayne Crawford, 69, American actor, writer and producer (Valley Girl, Jake Speed).
- Alphonsus F. D'Souza, 76, Indian Roman Catholic prelate, Bishop of Raiganj (since 1987), heart attack.
- Franco Di Giacomo, 83, Italian cinematographer.
- Marisol Escobar, 85, French-born American sculptor.
- Uwe Friedrichsen, 81, German actor (Faust, Schwarz Rot Gold, Sesamstraße).
- Guido Gillarduzzi, 76, Italian Olympic speed skater.
- Fritz Janschka, 97, Austrian-born American artist.
- Sir Harry Kroto, 76, British chemist, laureate of the Nobel Prize in Chemistry (1996).
- Réjean Lafrenière, 80, Canadian politician, member of the Quebec National Assembly (1989–2007).
- Ellen Niit, 87, Estonian children's writer, poet and translator.
- Scott Rains, 59, American travel writer, brain tumor.
- Phil Ryan, 69, Welsh keyboardist (Man).
- Tracy Scott, 46, American script supervisor (Whiplash, Concussion, Garden State), cancer.
- Jervis Stokes, 88, Australian rules footballer (Richmond).
- Peter Thomas, 91, American narrator (Nova, Forensic Files).
- Vasily Zvyagintsev, 71, Russian science fiction author.
