= Ferrone =

Ferrone is a surname. Notable people with the surname include:

- Adam Ferrone (born 1988), American battle-rap champion and podcaster for Barstool Sports
- Dan Ferrone (born 1958), Canadian football player
- Felicia Ferrone, American industrial and furniture designer
- John Ferrone (1924–2016), American book editor
- Steve Ferrone (born 1950), English drummer
