= Nade =

Nade or Nadé is a given name and surname which may refer to:

- Christian Nadé (born 1984), French professional footballer
- Mickaël Nadé (born 1999), French professional footballer
- Raphaël Nadé (born 1980), Ivorian professional footballer
- Nade Dieu (born c. 1970s), Belgian actress
- Nade Haley (1947–2016), American visual artist

== See also ==
- Grenade, sometimes called a 'nade' for short
