= Zemanek =

Zemanek is a Czech surname. Notable people with the surname include:

- Bohumil Zemánek (1942–1996), Czech sculptor
- Heinz Zemanek (1920–2014), Austrian computer pioneer
- John Zemanek (1921–2016), American architect
- Stan Zemanek (1947–2007), Australian radio broadcaster
