= Robert Dolan =

Robert Dolan may refer to:

- Robert J. Dolan, University of Michigan dean
- Robert Dolan (marine geologist) (1929–2016), marine geologist
- Robert E. Dolan (1906–1972), Broadway composer
