= Guy Rouxel =

French footballer (1926-2016)

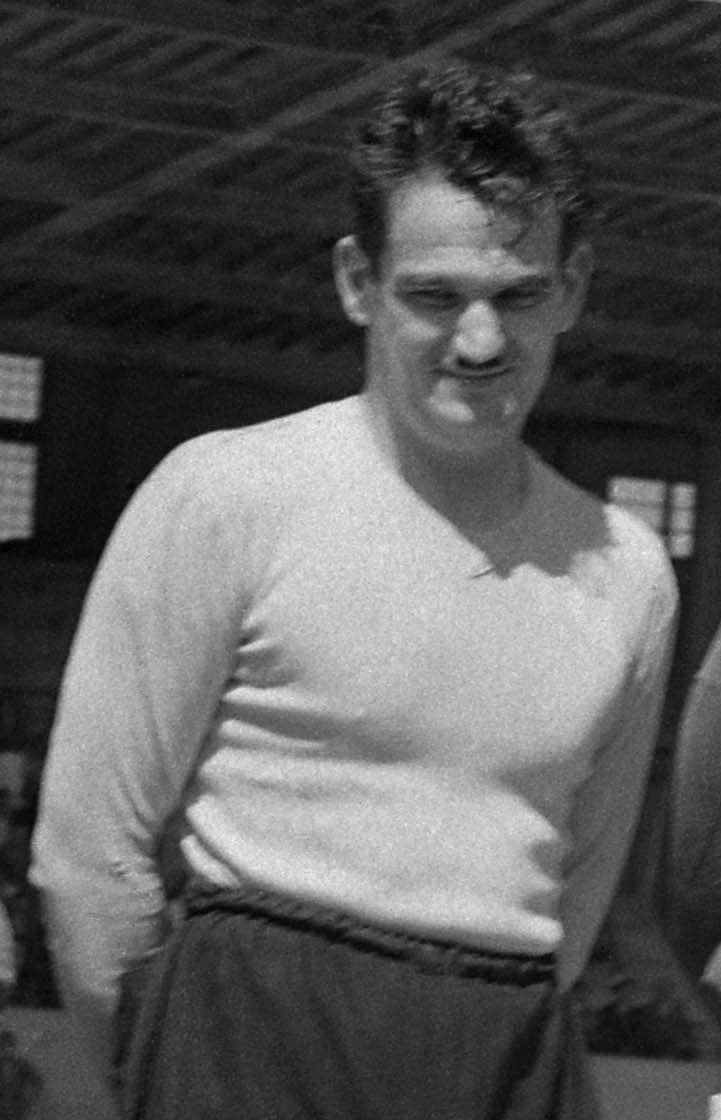

Personal information
- Date of birth: 24 January 1926
- Date of death: 18 April 2016 (aged 90)
- Position: Goalkeeper

International career
Years	Team	Apps	(Gls)
- France

Guy Rouxel (24 January 1926 – 18 April 2016) was a French footballer. He competed in the men's tournament at the 1948 Summer Olympics.
