= Huntly D. Millar =

- Born: 22 October 1927; Canada
- Died: 11 April 2016 (aged 88); Houston, Texas
- Awards: Laufman-Greatbatch prize

Huntly D. Millar (22 October 1927 – 11 April 2016) was the founder and CEO of Millar, Inc. He was awarded the Laufman-Greatbatch Prize from the Association for the Advancement of Medical Instrumentation in 2001 for his contributions to the advancement of medical instrumentation, such as the Millar Mikro-Tip Catheter and Millar micromanometers.

== Life and career ==
Millar was born in Montreal, Canada in 1927 and emigrated to the U.S. in 1954, settling in Houston, Texas. Millar formed the Texas-based company in 1969 to develop state-of-the-art catheter-tip technology for measuring physiological parameters in research and clinical applications. Millar holds a B.Sc. degree from McGill University and an M.Sc. (physics) from the University of Houston. He served as visiting professor in the Department of Molecular Physiology and Biophysics at Baylor College of Medicine from 1976 to 1995. He held 28 United States patents.

He died on April 11, 2016, at his home in Houston.

== Innovations ==
The Laufman-Greatbatch Prize, which includes a $5,000 endowment and a commemorative plaque, recognizes individuals for their outstanding service and/or accomplishment with a major impact on a specific medical device or on medical instrumentation in general. Millar catheters have come to represent the “gold standard” for accurate measurement of blood pressure, flow and volume in humans, and have become essential for acquisition of accurate hemodynamic data in assessment of pediatric and adult cardiovascular function.

Measurement of pressure elsewhere in the body has become essential for treatment of debilitating and life-threatening conditions. Intracranial pressure (ICP) measurement in cases of traumatic brain injury (TBI) has resulted in rapid treatment in emergency rooms and a dramatic increase in the number of patients surviving such injuries. Millar micromanometers (Leslie A. Geddes(1984). Cardiovascular Devices & Their Applications, pp. 46–47), are used in catheter-tip transducers such as the Codman Micro Sensor for measurement of ICP. Millar catheters are cited in well over two thousand articles in peer-reviewed journals, such as the American Heart Association journals and American Journal of Physiology. McDonald's Blood Flow in Arteries: Theoretical, Experimental and Clinical Principles, Sixth Edition by Nichols, O'Rourke and Vlachopoulos lists numerous cases in which Millar catheters have yielded information about the human circulatory system that was not available by any other technology.

The heart of the Millar pressure-tip transducer is the piezoresistive effect pressure sensor. Measuring pressure at the source delivers a high-fidelity signal without the disadvantages of fluid-filled catheters.

Huntly Millar's contributions to the non-invasive measurement of pulse pressure are well known. Michael F. O'Rourke credits Millar with the development of an applanation tonometer with the accuracy to record pulse pressure wave fluctuations when the surface of an artery is flattened. These catheter-tipped manometers made possible depiction of the changes in pulse pressure waveforms with age.
