= Rada Dyson-Hudson =

American anthropologist (1930–2016)

- Born: Vera Radaslava Demerec; July 8, 1930; Long Island, New York, U.S.
- Died: April 14, 2016 (aged 85); Ithaca, New York, U.S.
- Occupation: Anthropologist
- Spouse: Neville Dyson-Hudson
- Children: 2
- Father: Milislav Demerec
- Awards: Guggenheim Fellowship (1955)

Academic background
- Education: Swarthmore College; Somerville College, Oxford
- Thesis: Taxonomy and Ecology of the British Species of Drosophila (1954)
- Doctoral advisor: Arthur Cain; Philip Sheppard

Academic work
- Discipline: Anthropology
- Institutions: University of Khartoum; Johns Hopkins University; Binghamton University; Cornell University

Vera Radaslava Dyson-Hudson (née Demerec; July 8, 1930 – April 14, 2016) was an American anthropologist. Originally interested in Drosophila genetics and a winner of the 1947 Westinghouse Science Talent Search, she switched towards anthropology after meeting her husband Neville Dyson-Hudson. A 1955 Guggenheim Fellow, she did two field studies in east Africa, focusing on the Karamojong people and Turkana people. She was co author of Rethinking Human Adaptation: Biological and Cultural Models (1983) and HRAFlex (1985). Originally a lecturer at the University of Khartoum, she worked at Johns Hopkins University, Binghamton University, and Cornell University as a professor, retiring from the last school as a professor emeritus.

== Biography ==
=== Early life and education ===
Vera Radaslava Dyson-Hudson was born on July 8, 1930, on Long Island in New York, daughter of science teacher Mary Alexandra (née Ziegler) and geneticist Milislav Demerec, who was working at nearby Cold Spring Harbor Laboratory at the time. During her youth, she assisted "world-class" scientists and other children in their experiments, and befriended Sophie Coe (who also later became an anthropologist like her) with whom she once assisted Coe's father, evolutionary biologist Theodosius Dobzhansky, in his field research. She attended Huntington High School, and while a senior there, she was one of the co-winners of the 1947 Westinghouse Science Talent Search with her work on fruit fly genetics, (Note: The other winner was Martin Karplus, who would later become famous as a theoretical chemist and a co-winner of the 2013 Nobel Prize in Chemistry.) she later recalled in a 2003 New York Times interview that her victory there was "beginning of the chain" in getting research funding.

After attending Swarthmore College, she obtained her PhD as a Fulbright Scholar from Somerville College, Oxford, in 1954; her dissertation, Taxonomy and ecology of the British species of drosophila, was supervised by Arthur Cain and Philip Sheppard. She switched to anthropological work after meeting Neville Dyson-Hudson at Oxford, and they married in 1953 while still in Oxford.

=== Anthropological career ===
In 1955, she was awarded a Guggenheim Fellowship; this would later be one of the funding sources for the duo's three-year field study on the Karamojong people in the then–Protectorate of Uganda, which they undertook from January 1955 until September 1958; she would examine the ecological side of the people's pastoral life. In 1958, she also received a fellowship from the American Association of University Women for work on the project.

After her Karamojong field study, she later used the sociobiological approach in her research, applying it on her research on pastoral behavioral ecology and theorizing that human genetics explained the evolution of human behavior. She co-authored the book Rethinking Human Adaptation: Biological And Cultural Models (1983) with Michael A. Little and Eric Alden Smith.

After a long break from fieldwork due to security instability in Uganda, the duo resumed with a research project on the Turkana people in neighboring Kenya, funded by the Andrew W. Mellon Foundation, National Geographic Society, National Science Foundation, and Wenner-Gren Foundation for Anthropological Research; Rada herself surveyed the area's geography and ecology alongside her son and two Turkana field assistants. From 1982 to 1998, she had accumulated three years of field research on the Turkana people. She published several book chapters and journal articles based on her Turkana research, as well as the 1985 book HRAFlex she co-authored with J. Terrence McCabe. Despite working mostly with her husband in her field research, her "data and maps were invaluable in providing a broad picture of the habitat and ecology of the Turkana nomads that the ecologists did not have", as was also shown in her previous Karamojong field research.

=== University career ===
From 1960 to 1964, she served as a lecturer at the University of Khartoum while her husband worked there. She worked at her husband's employer Johns Hopkins University, where she was part of their Department of Pathobiology as a research associate and associate professor, but failed to obtain academic tenure or a permanent faculty position due to strict nepotism rules. She later joined the faculty of Binghamton University, with her last position there being as adjunct professor of anthropology. She became a lecturer at the Goucher College Department of Biological Sciences faculty in 1968, and in 1973, she became associate professor at the State University of New York College of Environmental Science and Forestry.

She later moved to the Cornell University Department of Anthropology. Accusing Cornell of discriminating against her gender in denying her tenure, (Note: Despite being promised tenure, she was reportedly at the same time given a teaching contract without any tenure.) she joined eight other Cornell employees in suing the university in 1978 for failing to act on their commitment to affirmative action for women, she later commented at an address at the 1979 Ithaca Spring Women's Festival that "if Cornell were hiring according to available qualified applicants, there would be 33 more women on the Cornell faculty." Although she and Cornell settled her lawsuit out of court in April 1979, she later became part of another planned sex discrimination lawsuit against Cornell in 1980, alongside the rest of the "Cornell 11". Subsequently, she became an associate professor at Cornell by 1985, and eventually professor emeritus.

=== Personal life, death, and legacy ===
Originally a resident of Cold Spring Harbor, New York, in 1958, she lived in Marathon, New York, as of 1980, but had moved to Ithaca by 1992. In the 1970s, she and her husband owned Dyson-Hudson Dispersal, an agriculture business that sold cattle.

On November 15, 1992, she was involved in a car accident in State College, Pennsylvania.

She died on April 14, 2016, in Ithaca, New York; she was 85. She and her husband had three children.

American Anthropologist said that her ecological approach made her a pioneer in East African pastoralist studies, also noting:

[H]er research established a critical precedent for pastoralist studies, in which human and livestock populations were linked inextricably to environmental dynamics. Her extensive use of mapping—of resources, land use, and population movements—remains a model of fundamental importance today in understanding the impact of climate change in these fragile human ecosystems. The work of anthropologists and ecologists who followed in her path, and the troubled course of pastoralist development in the last fifty or so years, are a testimony to her insight.
