= Enrique Cal Pardo =

Spanish writer

Enrique Cal Pardo (November 8, 1922 – April 28, 2016) was a Spanish Galician priest, teacher and writer. He was born in Galdo, Viveiro, (Galicia).

== Activity ==
Cal Pardo was Professor of Theology at the Major Seminary of Mondoñedo (Lugo) between 1946 and 1967. Professor of Theology at the Theological Institute of Santiago de Compostela between 1970 and 1992. Mondoñedo Trainer Seminar (1946–1954). Mondoñedo Seminary Rector (1956–1958). Canon Archivist Mondoñedo's Cathedral since 1953. Dean of the Cathedral of Mondonedo since 1979. Pro-Chancellor of the diocese of Mondoñedo between the years 1958–1966. Diocesan Director of the Apostleship of Prayer (1958–1967).

== Works performed ==
He published the following books:

- "The Monastery of the Isle of Colleira", Madrid, 1983.
- "The Monastery of St. Salvador de Pedroso, A Coruña, 1984";
- "Synodicon Hispanum". I. Galicia (Synodical Constitutions Mondoñedo), Madrid, 1981;
- Regesta medieval documents written on parchment, the Archive of the Cathedral of Mondonedo, Lugo, 1990;
- Mondoñedo - Cathedral City, Bishops in the sixteenth century, Lugo, 1992.
- The Music of the Cathedral of Mondoñedo, Lugo, 1996;
- Collection Medieval Diplomatic Archive Mondoñedo Cathedral. Full transcript of the documents, Santiago, 1999.
- Vivero in the Middle Ages, 1992.

He wrote extensive articles about "Mindoniense Episcopologio".
