= Solly Pandor =

Zambian football manager

Personal information
- Date of birth: 1957 or 1958
- Date of death: 20 April 2016 (aged 58)
- Place of death: Lusaka, Zambia

Managerial career
- Years: Team
- 1993–2000/2001: Zambia
- 2002–2010: Zambia

Solly Pandor (1957 or 1958 – 20 April 2016) was a Zambian football manager, who managed the Zambia national football team from 1993 until 2010.

== Managerial career ==
Pandor was appointed manager of the Zambia national football team in 1993, after the Gabon air disaster; Pandor managed the team for seven years, and then also from 2002 to 2010. Pandor was one of the longest serving national football managers in the world, and managed the team in five Africa Cup of Nations tournaments.

== Death and tributes ==
On 20 April 2016, Pandor collapsed at his sports shop in Lusaka. He was pronounced dead on arrival at CfB Hospital, at the age of 58. In accordance with Islamic customs, Pandor was buried on the same day, with the funeral at Burma Road Mosque. He is buried at the Leopards Hill cemetery. Former Football Association of Zambia president Teddy Mulonga said that "Solly was one of the most dedicated people I ever worked with in football, he was such a dedicated and dependable servant of the game", whilst former footballer Kalusha Bwalya said that Pandor "was an enthusiastic, dedicated and loyal manager of the national team and would be missed dearly by all."
