= Tony Munro =

Australian journalist

Australian journalist Tony Munro

Anthony John Munro (1963/64 – 23 April 2016) was an Australian journalist, known mostly for covering Associate and Affiliate cricket teams.

== Career ==
During the 1980s, Munro was a journalist for The Daily Advertiser; Munro worked on many sports, including cricket and basketball. From 1999 to 2010, Munro worked for ESPNcricinfo as their "Beyond The Test World" correspondent. In this role, Munro reported on Associate and Affiliate cricket teams. The teams he wrote about included the Falkland Islands and Nauru. Munro also edited the Cricket Round the World section of the Wisden Cricketers' Almanack from the mid-2000s until 2011; as of 2007, the section had covered 107 countries. Munro was also editor of the Short Statured People of Australia journal, and he had previously also worked for the Open Rugby magazine.

== Personal life ==
Munro was born in Wagga Wagga, New South Wales; Munro was born with dwarfism, which his brother Scott said was a "synergy between Mr Munro's dwarfism and his looking after the smaller cricket nations." He attended Wagga Wagga High School.

== Death ==
Munro died at the Prince of Wales Hospital in Sydney on 23 April 2016 of a stroke. Munro had been admitted to the hospital on 15 April, and had previously suffered a stroke in 2008. His funeral was held on 27 April in Macquarie Park, New South Wales. Speaking about his death, Australian House of Representatives member for Riverina Michael McCormack said that Munro "gave non-Test-playing countries a voice, a platform, so their stories could be told." The Short Statured People of Australia journal said that "Tony will always be remembered for his quick wit, great sense of humor and his ability to just let you chew his ear off and listen." Cricket Canada described Munro as "a phenomenal supporter of Associate cricket". He was survived by his mother, brother, two sisters, two nieces and five nephews.
