= John J. Johnson =

American politician

John Johnson

Member of the Missouri Senate from the 15th district
- In office 1960–1972
- Succeeded by: Frank Bild

Personal details
- Born: October 10, 1926 St. Louis, Missouri
- Died: April 7, 2016 (aged 89) Chesterfield, Missouri
- Party: Democratic
- Profession: real estate and insurance broker

John J. Johnson (October 10, 1926 – April 7, 2016) was an American politician in Missouri, who served as a state senator for twelve years from 1960 to 1972.

Born in St. Louis, Johnson attended Washington University, attaining a degree in political science in 1951. Before attending university, Johnson served in the United States Navy from 1944 to 1946 during World War II in the South Pacific Theater. He has experience as a real estate and insurance broker. Johnson was active in the Missouri State Democratic Committee and St. Louis County Democratic Central Committee in the 1950s, which he served on. In 1964 and 1968, he served as a delegate to the Democratic National Convention.

Johnson was elected as a Democrat to the Missouri State Senate for the 15th district in 1960, representing St. Louis County. During his time in the senate, he chaired the Senate Administration, Local Government, and Legislative Research committees. Also serving as a vice-chair of the Apportionments committee, he was additionally a member of the Appropriations, Banks and Financial Institutions, Bills Finally Passed, Education, Insurance, Instersate Cooperation, Roads and Highways, Rules and Joint Rules, Salaries, Resolutions, Gubernatorial Appointments and Miscellaneous Bills, State Budge Control and Ways and Means committees. He served until 1972 when he was succeeded by Frank Bild.

He was married to Louise Hahn and they had two children. Johnson died on April 7, 2016.
