= Janet Hodgson =

English artist (1960–2016)

- Born: Janet Ann Hodgson; 29 January 1960; Bolton, Lancashire, England
- Died: 15 April 2016 (aged 56); London, England
- Education: Wimbledon School of Art
- Known for: Installation art, public art, filmmaking

Janet Hodgson (29 January 1960 – 15 April 2016) was an English artist and filmmaker interested in archaeology, time, history and megaliths. Her 2008 work on Stonehenge was described in the magazine, British Archaeology, as having "generated the sensation of being lost in time."

== Early life and education ==
Janet Ann Hodgson was born on 29 January 1960, in Bolton, Lancashire. Her father, Harold Hodgson, was a journalist and her mother, Dorothy (nee Lambert), was a teacher. Hodgson was raised in Lincolnshire from the age of nine, where the family moved following her mother's death. She attended the Lincoln School of Art, then transferred to the Wimbledon School of Art where she pursued theater design.

== Career ==
Hodgson exhibited her work internationally at the Serpentine Gallery, the Tate Liverpool, Southbank Centre, Museo Civico di Rovereto Italy, the Ural Bienniale in Ekaterinburg Russia, the Oakville Galleries in Ontario, Canada, the Videoholica Bulgaria, among other venues.

In 1995, the Tate Liverpool commissioned Hodgson to create a work, White Cube: Black Square. The work involved the placement of a huge white cube made of sugar, 7 feet on each side, placed tangential to a pool of molasses, square in shape. The conceptual underpinnings of the work addressed the history of the Tate Gallery, that was founded by Henry Tate, a sugar magnate whose wealth was also linked to the slave trade. Throughout the duration of the show, the monolithic sugar cube disintegrated.

In 1998, Hodgson created, in collaboration with Anna Douglas, The Text Garden: A Composition in Time in Hull, England. The work was inspired by Hull's horticultural history.

In 2005, Hodgson created a permanent public art work, The Pits that referenced the excavations at Canterbury. Her collaborators included archaeologists and architects. The work is installed at Whitefriars Square, and consists of drawings of excavations sandblasted into the paving stones.

Hodgson also collaborated on projects with the Art + Archaeology group to work on various projects including a short film titled, My Passage Through a Brief Unity in Time (2010), about Maud Cunnington, an early 20th century archaeologist who worked on excavations at Avebury, Stonehenge, Woodhenge, The Sanctuary (an Avebury associated site) and other sites.

Hodgson has described her process as "wrenching of one architectural context to another" and how this can create "tensions between different circumstances, traditions and assumptions."

An archive of exhibition reviews and catalogues, press releases and other ephemera is held at Goldsmiths in the Women's Art Library.

=== Work as an educator ===
Hodgson was also an educator, having taught at several institutions, including the University of Kent, as well as the Birmingham School of Art at Birmingham City University. She helped to develop the educational team at the Tate Liverpool, and went on to work for the education department at the Tate Modern. She also worked as an educator at the Whitechapel Art Gallery and the Camden Art Centre in London.

== Critical reception ==
Padraig Timoney wrote of Hodgson's film installation, History Lesson (1999), shown at the Bluecoat Gallery, Liverpool, that "when history and film are brought together, historical representation as a construct is the subject of a process whose own conventional constructions are the means of revealing the first. Yet the artificiality and illusionistic fascination of the film are so integral to the experience that it can't help but double as subject." Rachel Garfield and Bryan Biggs wrote of the same project that it was "Formally inventive and disorienting, film was used as a time machine, reality and fiction colliding, the past recreated in the present."

== Death ==
Hodgson died on 16 March 2016.
