= Constance-Anne Parker =

British artist and sculptor (1921–2016)

- Born: 19 October 1921; London, England
- Died: 1 April 2016 (aged 94)
- Education: Royal Academy Schools; Regent Street Polytechnic
- Known for: Sculpture

Constance-Anne Parker (19 October 1921 – 1 April 2016) was a British sculptor who held a number of roles at the Royal Academy.

== Biography ==
Parker was born in London and studied painting at the Royal Academy Schools from 1946 to 1951. While at the RA Schools Parker won four silver and two bronze medals and she also took evening classes in sculpture at the Regent Street Polytechnic School of Art. Parker exhibited paintings and sculptures with the New English Art Club, with the Royal Academy and with both the Royal Society of Portrait Painters and the Royal Society of British Sculptors, of which she was a fellow. In 1974, Parker became the librarian at the RA and eventually a lecturer, archivist and travelling exhibitions organiser with the Academy. From 1952 to 1976, Parker served as the honorary treasurer of the Reynolds Club, the alumni society of the RA Schools, and in due course became its chairperson. Parker wrote a number of books on art including Mr Stubbs the Horse Painter in 1971 and A Picture of the RA published in 1985. A retrospective exhibition of Parker's sculptures were held in 1977 at the Belgrave Gallery in London.
