= Martin Roberts (rugby union, born 1968) =

English rugby union player

Martin Roberts (26 January 1968 – 9 April 2016) was an English rugby union player who played for Gloucester.
