= Errikos Belies =

Greek poet and translator

- Born: Ερρίκος Μπελιές; 1950; Athens, Greece
- Died: 19 April 2016 (aged 65－66); Athens, Greece
- Education: National and Kapodistrian University of Athens
- Occupations: Poet, novelist, translator

Errikos Belies (1950 – 19 April 2016) was a Greek poet, novelist and translator.

== Biography ==
Errikos Belies studied English Literature and Archaeology at the National and Kapodistrian University of Athens. He published six poetry collections and translated 24 novels and 159 plays.

In 1977, he finished his military and university studies, took his exams at the Ministry of Foreign Affairs of Greece and became an employee of the Ministry and at the same time published his first book in Kedros Publications.

He also taught Theatre History at the Drama Schools of the National Theatre, the Theatre of Art, the National Theatre.

== Works ==
=== Poetry ===
1. Εγκόλπιο (pub: Kedros)
2. Οι δίαυλοι (pub: Kedros)
3. Το διακεκριμένο σώμα (pub: Odysseas)
4. Πόλεως (pub: Odysseas)
5. Το εισόδια του φόβου (pub: Kastaniotis, pub: Odysseas)
6. Φαινόμενον ως να έπλεε και μένον ακίνητον (pub: Odysseas)

=== Novel translations ===
1. Virginia Woolf: Jacob's Room (pub: Odysseas)
2. Graham Swift: Waterland (pub: Estia)
3. Graham Swift: Shuttlecock (pub: Estia)
4. Graham Swift: The Sweet-Shop Owner (pub: Estia)
5. Graham Swift: Out of this world (pub: Estia)
6. Graham Swift: Learning to Swim (pub: Estia)
7. Marianne McDonald: Ο Ευριπίδης στον κινηματογράφο (pub: Estia)
8. Marianne McDonald: Οι όροι της ευτυχίας στον Ευριπίδη (pub: Odysseas)
9. D. H. Lawrence: Aaron's Rod (pub: Kastaniotis)
10. Pär Lagerkvist: The Dwarf (pub: Kastaniotis)
11. Mary Shelley: Frankenstein (pub: Estia)
12. Dirk Bogarde: Jericho (pub: Patakis)
13. John Grisham: The Firm (pub: Patakis)
14. Paul Gallico: The Snow Goose: A Story of Dunkirk (pub: Okeanida)
15. Paul Gallico: Small Miracle (pub: Okeanida)
16. Gian Carlo Menotti: Amahl and the Night Visitors (pub: Okeanida)
17. Hans Christian Andersen: Fairy tales (pub: Okeanida)
18. Hans Christian Andersen: Fairy tales (pub: Ammos)
19. F. Scott Fitzgerald: Τ’ απομεινάρια της ευτυχίας (pub: Kedros)
20. Oscar Wilde: The Happy Prince (pub: Kedros)
21. Tennessee Williams: Short stories (pub: Patakis)
22. Tennessee Williams: The Night of the Iguana (pub: Patakis)
23. Tennessee Williams: 27 Wagons Full of Cotton (pub: Patakis)
24. L. Frank Baum: The Wonderful Wizard of Oz (pub: Ammos)

=== Play translations ===
1. Oscar Wilde: A Woman of No Importance (pub: Ypsilon)
2. Oscar Wilde: An Ideal Husband (pub: Eridanos)
3. Oscar Wilde: Salome (pub: Eridanos)
4. Oscar Wilde: The Duchess of Padua (pub: Eridanos)
5. Samuel Beckett: Happy Days (pub: Kedros)
6. Molière: The Miser (pub: Eridanos)
7. Tennessee Williams: Suddenly, Last Summer (pub: Kedros)
8. Tennessee Williams: The Rose Tattoo (pub: Kedros)
9. Tennessee Williams: Kingdom of Earth (pub: Kedros)
10. Tennessee Williams: A Lovely Sunday for Creve Coeur (pub: Kedros)
11. Tennessee Williams: The Milk Train Doesn't Stop Here Anymore (pub: Kedros)
12. Tennessee Williams: Cat on a Hot Tin Roof (pub: Kedros)
13. Tennessee Williams: The Glass Menagerie (pub: Kedros)
14. Tennessee Williams: Summer and Smoke (pub: Kedros)
15. Tennessee Williams: A Streetcar Named Desire (pub: Kedros)
16. Tennessee Williams: The Lady of Larkspur Lotion (pub: Kedros)
17. Tennessee Williams: The Last of My Solid Gold Watches (pub: Kedros)
18. Tennessee Williams: Portrait of a Madonna (pub: Kedros)
19. Tennessee Williams: Hello from Bertha (pub: Kedros)
20. Tennessee Williams: This Property Is Condemned (pub: Kedros)
21. Tennessee Williams: Something Unspoken (pub: Kedros)
22. Tennessee Williams: The Dark Room (pub: Kedros)
23. Tennessee Williams: At Liberty (pub: Kedros)
24. Tennessee Williams: Orpheus Descending (pub: Kedros)
25. Tennessee Williams: The Night of the Iguana (pub: Kedros)
26. Tennessee Williams: Sweet Bird of Youth (pub: Kedros)
27. Arthur Miller: Death of a Salesman (pub: Patakis)
28. Jean Cocteau: Les Parents Τerribles (pub: Patakis)
29. Edward Albee: Three Tall Women (pub: Kedros)
30. Edward Albee: The Zoo Story (pub: Patakis)
31. Edward Albee: The Play About the Baby (pub: Kedros)
32. Edward Albee: The Goat, or Who is Sylvia? (pub: Kedros)
33. Edward Albee: Who's Afraid of Virginia Woolf? (pub: Kedros)
34. Edward Albee: A Delicate Balance (pub: Kedros)
35. Anton Chekhov: The Seagull (pub: Ypsilon)
36. Anton Chekhov: Uncle Vanya (pub: Ypsilon)
37. Anton Chekhov: Three Sisters (pub: Kedros)
38. Anton Chekhov: The Cherry Orchard (pub: Kedros)
39. Anton Chekhov: Ivanov (pub: Kedros)
40. Anton Chekhov: On the Harmful Effects of Tobacco (pub: Kedros)
41. Anton Chekhov: The Swan Song (pub: Kedros)
42. Anton Chekhov: The Bear (pub: Kedros)
43. Anton Chekhov: A Marriage Proposal (pub: Kedros)
44. Anton Chekhov: The Anniversary (pub: Kedros)
45. Anton Chekhov: The Wedding (pub: Kedros)
46. Federico García Lorca: The House of Bernarda Alba (pub: Eridanos)
47. Federico García Lorca: Yerma (pub: Eridanos)
48. Federico García Lorca: Doña Rosita the Spinster (pub: Eridanos)
49. Federico García Lorca: The Shoemaker's Prodigious Wife (pub: Eridanos)
50. Brian Friel: Molly Sweeney (pub: Patakis)
51. Brian Friel: Faith Healer (pub: Patakis)
52. Murray Schisgal: The Tiger (pub: Patakis)
53. Euripides: The Trojan Women (pub: Patakis)
54. Eugene O'Neill: Desire Under the Elms (Kέδρος)
55. Eugene O'Neill: A Moon for the Misbegotten (pub: Kedros)
56. Ramón del Valle-Inclán: Divinas Palabras (pub: Eridanos)
57. Alan Bennett: A Chip in the Sugar (pub: Kedros)
58. Alan Bennett: Her Big Chance (pub: Kedros)
59. Alan Bennett: A Lady of Letters (pub: Kedros)
60. Alan Bennett: A Bed Among the Lentils (pub: Kedros)
61. William Shakespeare: As You Like It (pub: Kedros)
62. William Shakespeare: The Winter's Tale (pub: Kedros)
63. William Shakespeare: Much Ado About Nothing (pub: Kedros)
64. William Shakespeare: Twelfth Night (pub: Kedros)
65. William Shakespeare: Julius Caesar (pub: Kedros)
66. William Shakespeare: Titus Andronicus (pub: Kedros)
67. William Shakespeare: Richard III (pub: Kedros)
68. William Shakespeare: The Merchant of Venice (pub: Kedros)
69. William Shakespeare: Othello (pub: Kedros)
70. William Shakespeare: A Midsummer Night's Dream (pub: Kedros)
71. William Shakespeare: The Tempest (pub: Kedros)
72. William Shakespeare: King Lear (pub: Ypsilon)
73. William Shakespeare: Hamlet (pub: Ypsilon)
74. William Shakespeare: Macbeth (pub: Ypsilon)
75. William Shakespeare: Romeo and Juliet (pub: Ypsilon)
76. William Shakespeare: The Taming of the Shrew (pub: Kedros)
77. William Shakespeare: Richard II (pub: Kedros)
78. William Shakespeare: Timon of Athens (pub: Kedros)
79. William Shakespeare: The Comedy of Errors (pub: Kedros)
80. William Shakespeare: Troilus and Cressida (pub: Kedros)
81. William Shakespeare: Antony and Cleopatra (pub: Kedros)
82. William Shakespeare: Love's Labour's Lost (pub: Kedros)
83. William Shakespeare: King John (pub: Kedros)
84. William Shakespeare: The Two Gentlemen of Verona (pub: Kedros)
85. William Shakespeare: Coriolanus (pub: Kedros)
86. William Shakespeare: The Merry Wives of Windsor (pub: Kedros)
87. William Shakespeare: Cymbeline (pub: Kedros)
88. William Shakespeare: Henry IV, Part 1 (pub: Kedros)
89. William Shakespeare: Henry IV, Part 2 (pub: Kedros)
90. William Shakespeare: All's Well That Ends Well (pub: Kedros)
91. William Shakespeare: Measure for Measure (pub: Kedros)
92. William Shakespeare: Pericles, Prince of Tyre (pub: Kedros)
93. William Shakespeare: Henry VI, Part 1 (pub: Kedros)
94. William Shakespeare: Henry VI, Part 2 (pub: Kedros)
95. William Shakespeare: Henry VI, Part 3 (pub: Kedros)
96. William Shakespeare: Henry V΄ (pub: Kedros)
97. William Shakespeare: Henry VIIΙ (pub: Kedros)
