= Mame Younousse Dieng =

Senegalese writer

- Born: 1939; Tivaouane
- Died: 2016|04|01
- Citizenship: Senegal
- Occupation: Writer

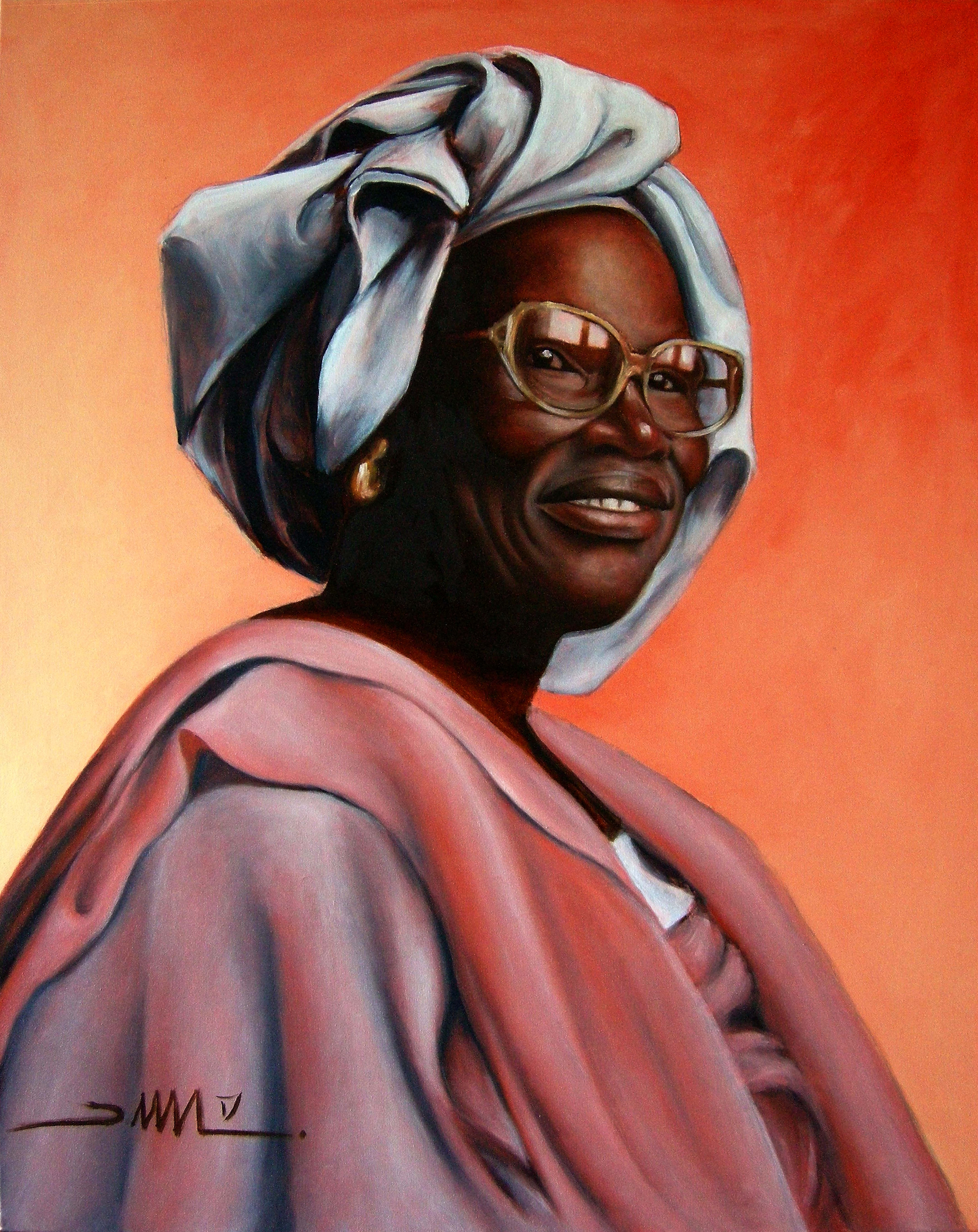
Mame Younousse Dieng in 2017

Mame Younousse Dieng (1939 – 1 April 2016) was a Senegalese writer born in Tivaouane who lived in Dakar. Her novel Aawo bi is noteworthy as one of the first Senegalese novels in the Wolof language. She also wrote poetry and translated the national anthem into that language.

== Books ==
- Aawo bi (The First Wife), 1992 - in Wolof
- L'Ombre en feu (The Shadow on Fire), Nouvelles Editions Africaines du Sénégal (1997), ISBN 2-7236-1108-6 - in French
