= Jesse Mann =

Jesse Aloysius Mann (May 18, 1922 – April 10, 2016), a native of Washington, D.C., was an American educator of philosophy.

== Education ==
Mann graduated from Gonzaga College High School in Washington, D.C. He earned a Ph.D. at the Catholic University of America in 1958.

== Career ==
Mann was a professor emeritus of philosophy at Georgetown University and a Georgetown faculty member from 1947 until 1997. His Georgetown work included serving as dean of the Edmund A. Walsh School of Foreign Service and dean of the School for Summer and Continuing Education.

A faculty committee at the university annually awards the Jesse A. Mann Medal in his honor to a graduating senior majoring in culture and politics.

== Personal life ==
Mann married Anne (née Corbett) Mann. The couple had three children, Maureen Mann Ritz, Angela Mann and the late Jesse Mann. He died on April 10, 2016, at age 93.
