= Jack Tafari =

Rastafari activist

Jack Tafari (born 31 October 1946 in Gravesend, Kent, United Kingdom, died 20 April 2016 in Accra, Ghana) was a sometimes homeless Rastafari activist who advocated for himself and other homeless people, in the US and the UK. He was best known for promoting "sanctioned tent cities" as transitional housing for homeless people, including himself, in Portland, Oregon, United States.

== Activism ==
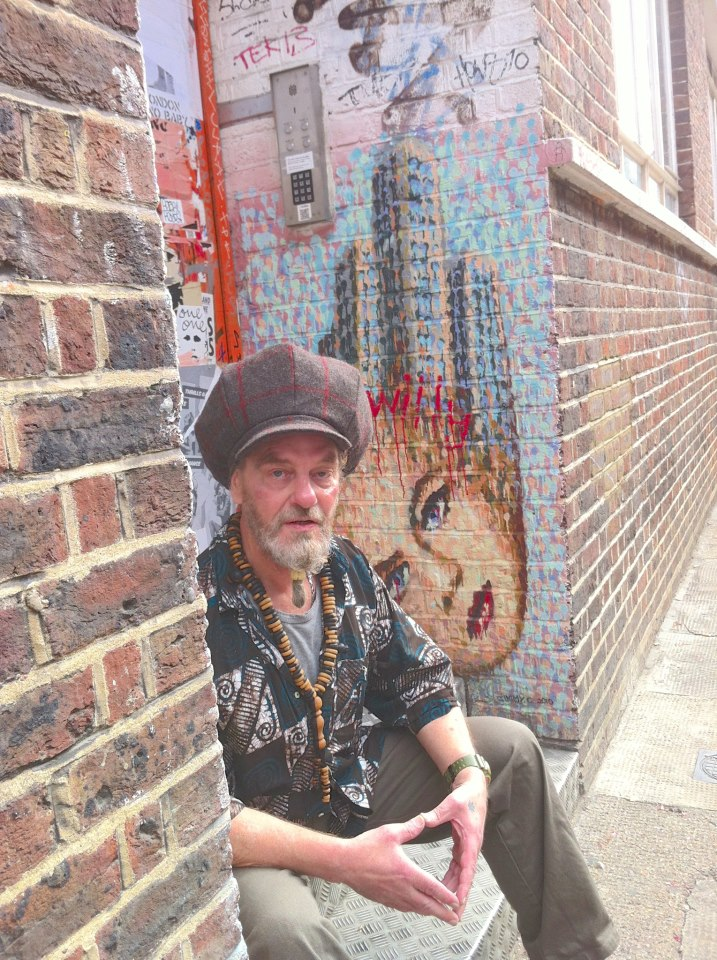
Jack Tafari

In February 2000, Tafari moved from Salem, Oregon to Portland, Oregon after being fired from a job. He was homeless, and he, with others, created Dignity Village in 2000, as a 'sanctioned tent city' (self governing homeless shelter) in Portland, Oregon.

In December 2000, Tafari was sleeping rough under bridges and in doorways in Portland, Oregon, United States. There were too few shelter spaces for all of Portland's homeless, and Tafari found himself sharing the streets with others. With seven others, Tafari began occupying city properties and pitching tents. "Confronted by police for their unlicensed use of public land, the initial group of eight men and women had the benefit of a forceful voice in the person of homeless activist Jack Tafari, and the early support of a few local politicians and associated coverage in the local media. The Portland police department eventually realized that the group, then calling themselves Camp Dignity, was engaged in complicated Constitutional issues of redress of grievance, and deferred the political issue to the local political authority: The Portland City Council and Mayor".

While living on Portland's streets, Tafari had become the protector of a sixteen-year-old boy who went by the 'street name' of Field Mouse. Field Mouse had been evicted from a hostel for runaways for violating curfew. As his 'street father', Tafari helped him to forage for food and protected him from 'chicken hawks', or sexual predators. At a Portland public library, Field Mouse taught Tafari how to use computers and email.

Camp Dignity lasted for about six months underneath Portland's Fremont Bridge. The Mayor and Council granted the camp the status of a city "pilot project" and offered them a site seven miles from Portland at the Sunderland Recycling Yard. As a negotiating tactic, Tafari distributed another press release headlined "We're Having a Big Parade". Faced with the prospect of another highly publicized parade of the indigent, Portland backed down, and allowed the campers two more months at the Fremont Bridge site. Calling off the planned parade, Tafari sent out another press release. After protracted negotiations, Camp Dignity accepted Portland's offered site at the Sunderland Recycling Yard.

Throughout the 'Out of the Doorways Campaign' years, Tafari was a staff writer and submissions editor for the Portland street newspaper Street Roots, and he used this position to publicise his cause among the homeless. The following passage, from an article in the December 2000 issue, is an example of the language Tafari used in his articles to rally Portland's homeless to his cause. He said,

Today we live in a time of social transformation… a new informational age and a time of economic globalization. It is a time of social dislocation. Today the economy is booming and so is the homeless population. What we see around us now in the downtown core of our cities is homeless people wall-to-wall. Many of the jobs that paid anything have gone south or elsewhere or are now done by machine. Today the cost of space in our cities to live in is climbing beyond the reach of many low-income people. And today homeless people are harried and harassed, run from here to there, taxed by fines, commodified and used as a resource, sometimes brutalized, occasionally felonized and often used as slave labour by the prison industry. You know what they say: the good can't rest and the wicked never sleep. Not, of course, that ev'ry one of we is good. But we are human beings and we do not deserve the treatment we receive at the hands of wicked men. Very soon now we shall pitch the tents of Joshua on various sites around the city. We are blessed here in Oregon with ample public land and so there is space if not a place for us to go. We must build that place for ourselves. Know that the kernel of the future lies buried in the present. It is important for the future how we set up and govern our camps now. We have many friends. There are those who would fight against we, workers of iniquity who profit from our situation and would rather things remain the way they are. It is time to be of good courage, brothers and sisters. We may wander for a time in the wilderness. But as surely as night follows day, one day we shall reach a land flowing with milk and honey.

Dignity Village, a homeless camp incorporated in Portland, Oregon as a 501(c)(3) membership-based non-profit organization, is set up as a self-governing entity, and "residents" are bound by five rules of behaviour, contained in their membership agreement. Tafari was chairman of Dignity Village Inc. from 2002 until 2005. The community has generated considerable international interest as a possible means of ameliorating the problem of developed world homelessness. In 2004, Tafari was invited to London to address the Crisis Innovations Fair on the subject of homelessness and possible solutions. He shared the podium with Dr. Michael Woolcock, senior social scientist with the World Bank.

Dignity Village has been featured in articles in London's The Guardian, in The New York Times, and in other publications and media. The LA Times captured Tafari's vision for Dignity Village in a whimsical, idyllic quotation. "Essentially, we will create housing for ourselves....The housing will be solar-powered, wind-driven. We'll eat from our garden, on our own table, and rest under our own fig trees when our labors are done."

Dignity Village, founded in 2001, by 2016 also served as a widely emulated prototype for the tiny houses for the homeless movement: as an example, Opportunity Village in Eugene Oregon.

In 2005 Tafari was diagnosed with hepatitis C. As he was poor he had no US health insurance, and was therefore unable to have his condition treated. He was also a UK citizen. He resigned his position as CEO of Dignity Village and returned to London to receive medical treatment under the English National Health Service (NHS). Homeless at first, he took advantage of English squatting laws to secure temporary housing for himself and sometimes others. These laws, which originated in the Middle Ages, allowed for unoccupied buildings to be taken over as temporary housing by those in need. During this period Tafari honed his squatting skills in three areas: the 'scouting' of suitable squats; 'cracking' squats (gaining entry); and 'legally filing' (registering) squats, such that property owners would have to go to court to secure evictions by means of interim possession orders.

In 2007 Tafari secured housing for himself when he was awarded a council flat on a Peabody Trust estate in Islington, north London. Now a British pensioner, and with his hepatitis C in remission, he had a secure base from which to continue his activism. He therefore set out to reconfigure his housing for the homeless strategy to suit the English legal and institutional landscape. With a small network of co activists, he began scouting, cracking and legally registering squats as temporary housing for homeless people, sometimes working informally with organisations such as the Advisory Service for Squatters.

On 1 September 2012, squatting residential properties became a criminal offence in England. Tafari nevertheless continued to advocate for housing rights for homeless people, for example by forcefully opposing the sale to private developers of London's dwindling stock of council housing.

== Death in Africa ==
In January 2016, Tafari was diagnosed in London with inoperable liver cancer. With help from a group of friends, he achieved his bucket list wish to revisit Africa, where he had travelled in 2010 in the company of his friend Leland Larson, philanthropist, of the Oregon-based Larson Legacy. He left London in the company of another close friend, Maira Fenci, travelling first to Casablanca, and then to Accra, Ghana. He died on 20 April at the 37 Military Hospital in Accra of liver failure, and is buried in Akuma Village on the outskirts of Accra. His wake and burial were performed in accordance with blended Ghanaian and Rastafari funeral rites, and included crowds of guests from Accra's Rastafari community.
