= Felicia Ferrone =

American architect and designer

Felicia Ferrone is an American industrial and furniture designer who resides and works in Chicago, Illinois.

== Early life ==
Born in Chicago, Felicia Ferrone graduated with a degree in architecture from Miami University, Ohio, after which she moved to Milan. Ferrone’s reach is informed by her early experience as an architect in Milan, where she first learned to “blur boundaries". In a series of positions with Italian designers, among them Antonio Citterio and Piero Lissoni. She developed her belief that all aspects of design are interdependent, that nothing exists in a vacuum, but always in relation to the environment, objects, and systems that surround it.

== Career ==
Ferrone's works are included in the Art Institute of Chicago permanent collection and her work is widely exhibited and published internationally. She served as Assistant Professor and Director of Graduate Studies in Industrial Design at the University of Illinois at Chicago, and was an Instructor at the School of the Art Institute of Chicago. She produces and distributes her own work under her fferrone brand. She does commissioned work for clients, including Boffi, Volume Gallery, and Covo.

In 2019, Felicia Ferrone was included in The Study by 1stdibs, 10 Trailblazing Female Designers.

She was Number 13 in "Design 50: Who Shapes Chicago 2019" in New City Magazine

== Style ==
Her namesake brand fferrone design, based in Chicago, is known for delivering the unexpected through a seemingly simple gesture. Archetypes are reinvented; typologies are crossed and blended. European influences, minimalist aesthetics, mastery of proportion, and meticulously considered details are the hallmarks of fferrone. Through collaborations with master artisans, each piece is handcrafted allowing for innovative use of materials and production techniques, underlying another fundamental attribute to her design philosophy and approach.

== Exhibitions ==
- The Space in Between at Pavilion, Chicago 2015
- Americans in Paris, The Mona Bismarck Centre, Paris 2014
- CHGO DSGN at the Chicago Cultural Center, Chicago 2014
- America Made Me, London Design Week 2012
- The Art Institute of Chicago's Permanent Collection of Architecture and Design
- On Space at Volume Gallery, Chicago 2010

== Awards and recognition ==
- Best Furniture Collection awarded by ASID at the International Contemporary Furniture Fair, New York May 2014
- Best Collection at NY NOW Gift Show, New York August 2014
- GOOD DESIGN AWARD for the Revolution Wine and Water, Chicago Athenaeum 2004
