= Alexander Kanengoni =

- Born: 17 September 1951; Chivhu, Zimbabwe
- Died: 12 April 2016 (aged 64); Harare, Zimbabwe
- Education: Kutama College; University of Zimbabwe
- Occupation: Novelist

Alexander Gore Kanengoni (17 September 1951 – 12 April 2016) was a Zimbabwean writer and veteran of the Zimbabwe War of Liberation.

== Life ==
Kanengoni trained as a teacher at Kutama College. He joined the Zimbabwe African National Liberation Army (ZANLA) in 1974, before enrolling at the University of Zimbabwe following independence in 1980. Kanengoni later worked for the Ministry of Education and Culture, the Zimbabwe Broadcasting Corporation and the Patriot newspaper.

He is best known for his war novel Echoing Silences, which has been described as 'an extraordinarily powerful novel, on a par with Bao Ninh's novel of the Vietnamese struggle, The Sorrow of War.' Alexandra Fuller dedicated her second novel,Scribbling the Cat, to Kanengoni. Fuller had never met Kanengoni, but considered him the metaphorical ‘godfather’ to her novel after she discovered Echoing Silences in Johannesburg airport.

== Works ==
- Kanengoni, Alexander (1983). Vicious Circle. Macmillan Education.
- —— (1987). When the Rainbird Cries. Harare: Longman.
- —— (1993). Effortless Tears. Harare: Baobab Books.
- —— (1998). Echoing Silences. London: Heinemann, African Writers Series.
- —— (2003). Writing Still. Harare: Waever Press.
