= Richard G. Dupont =

American politician (1943–2016)

Member of the New Hampshire House of Representatives from the Hillsborough 47th district
- In office 1984–1988

Personal details
- Born: May 31, 1943
- Died: April 5, 2016 (aged 72)
- Party: Democratic
- Spouse: Laurie Lane

Richard G. Dupont (May 31, 1943 – April 5, 2016) was an American politician. He served as a Democratic member for the Hillsborough 47th district of the New Hampshire House of Representatives.

Dupont was educated in Manchester High School West and New Hampshire College. He served in the United States Army and United States Coast Guard.
