= Per-Simon Kildal =

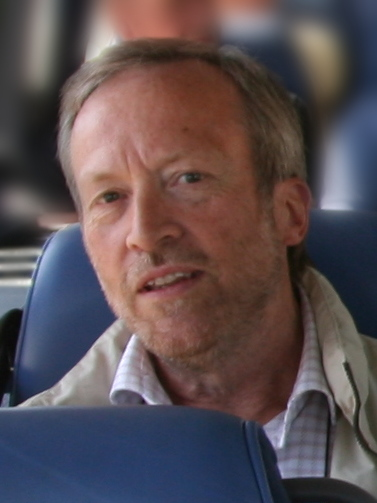
Per-Simon Kildal (2010).

Per-Simon Kildal (4 July 1951 – 21 April 2016) was professor of antenna systems at Chalmers University of Technology in Sweden, IEEE fellow and the winner of Distinguished Achievement Award of the IEEE Antennas and Propagation Society in 2011. Kildal had contributed to design of reflector antennas for radio astronomy worldwide, most notably the Gregorian reflector of Arecibo Observatory which was installed in 1997. Apart from reflector antennas, he had made contributions to wideband radiotelescope feeds, Over-The-Air (OTA) measurements of the antennas and metamaterial applications.

He founded the companies Bluetest AB, Gapwaves AB and RanLOS AB. Bluetest is based on his innovation to measure the performance of wireless devices, with a test chamber used by companies and telecom operators worldwide. Gapwaves aims to commercialize the waveguide technology invented by Kildal, a design that can control unwanted electromagnetic waves in electronic components. The ideas for the gap waveguide technique were presented in a scientific article 1990, which is today cited by other researchers over 400 times.
