= Mikhail Farikh =

Russian private helicopter pilot (1959–2016)

- Фарих Михаил Ростиславович
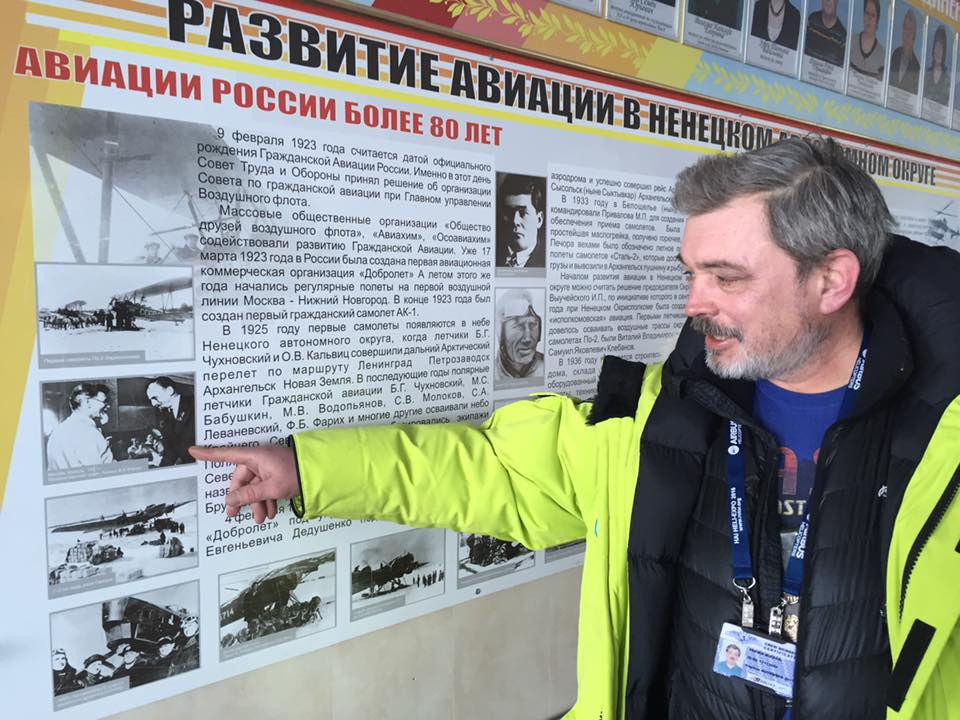
- Michael points at his grandfather's photo. Naryan-Mar Airport April 18, 2016
- Born: Mikhail Rostislavovich Farikh; June 6, 1959; Moscow, Russia
- Died: April 18, 2016 (aged 56); 73°19′40″N 69°59′37″E — Bely Island, Russia
- Cause of death: Air accident
- Resting place: Novodevichy Cemetery, Russia
- Education: High
- Known for: first Russian to go around the world by helicopter
- Spouse: Eugenia Farikh
- Website: youtube.com/user/9697873

Mikhail Rostislavovich Farikh (Russian: Фарих Михаил Ростиславович) (June 6, 1959, Moscow — April 18, 2016 Bely) was a private helicopter pilot and the first Russian to go around the world by helicopter and to reach the North Pole. He held world records in helicopter competitions. He helped popularize light aviation and was a prominent activist in the world of Russian GA. He was also an active member of the aviation organization AOPA Russia.

== Biography ==
He was born in Moscow in 1959 into the family of test pilot Rostislav Fabiovich Farikh born May 12, 1922. His grandfather Fabio Farikh was a prominent polar pilot and a motoring pioneer in Russia.

In 1976, Farikh graduated from Moscow School No. 10. He entered the law faculty of the Military Institute of the Ministry of Defense (which is now, after several transformations, part of the MU RF MD), from which he graduated in 1980. He served in the armed forces as a legal officer until 1995. He retired with the rank of lieutenant-colonel.

After being discharged into the reserves, he went into the automobile audio equipment business. He was fond of multi-discipline car audio competitions and in 2006 became the Russian champion in EMMA racing, in which driving skills as well as car audio and tuning are put to the test.

After giving up his active role in business, Farikh enrolled in cooking courses, studied Italian, and then ended up by chance in a flying club, where he began to study flying at the age of 48

== Mobile sound systems ==
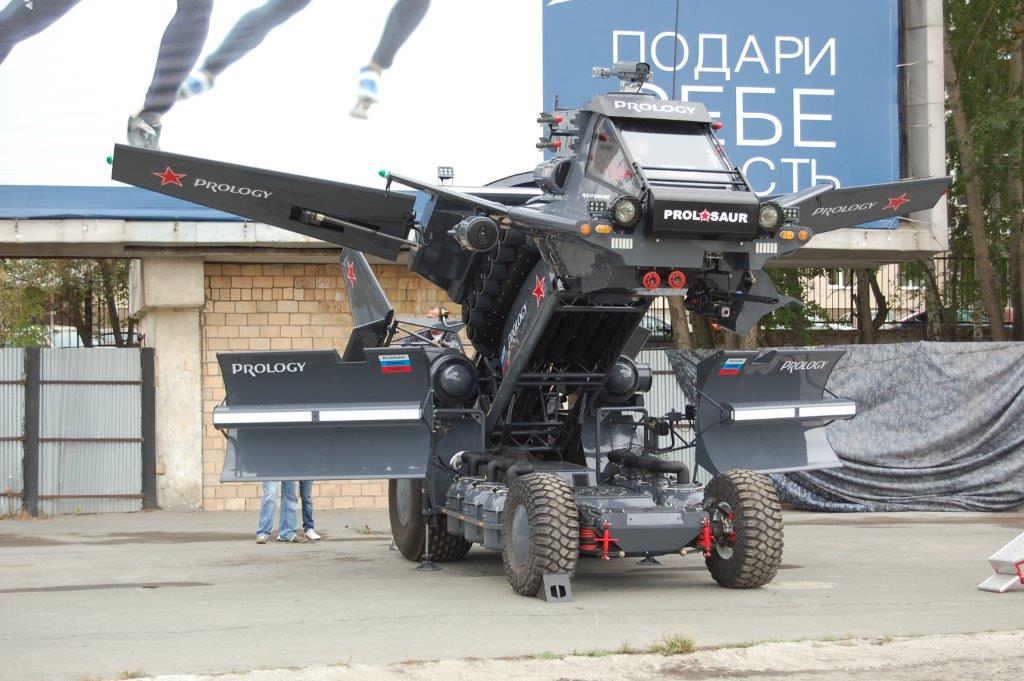
Prolozavr demo car

Mikhail Farikh contributed to the Russian and international mobile sound-system design and all-terrain vehicles. The projects he headed attracted great attention at car audio competitions, exhibitions, and social events. In sound-pressure level (SPL) competitions between 2001 and 2007, Team Prology took first place 48 times and second place twice, and set 14 Russian records. The absolute Russian record of 173.4 dB, set in 2003 with the car named "Ladoga," has yet to be surpassed.

He helped to develop and build a number of mobile audio complexes (Hurricane, Typhoon, JBL Sound Cruiser, Prolozavr 1.0 and 2.0). The JBL Sound Cruiser test car made a great impression at the 2005 IFA in Berlin and received worldwide acclaim.

== Flying ==
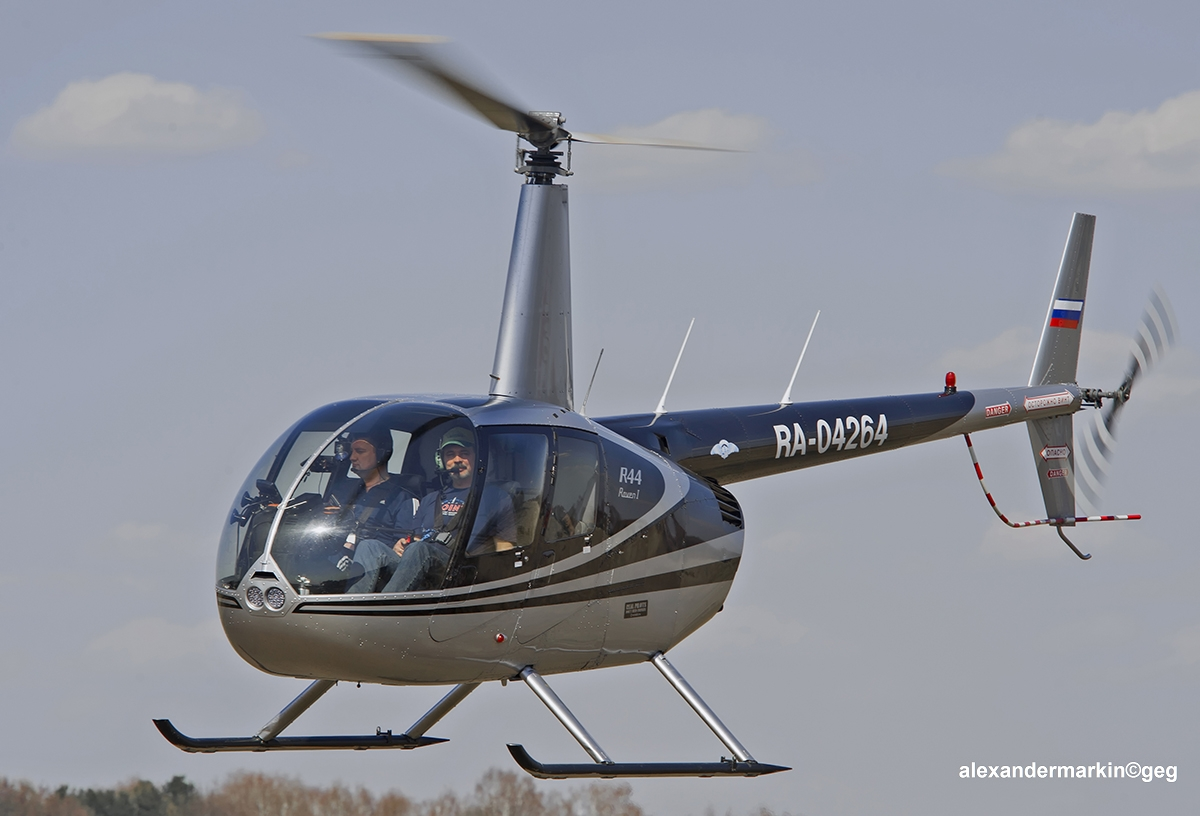
Farikh in flight, aboard his R44

Farikh began to learn to fly helicopters in 2007. In 2008, he acquired his private pilot's license. He immediately began flying frequently and extensively. He acquired a British pilot's license in the same year, and an American one in 2010.

In subsequent years, he continued to increase his qualifications by attending courses at various domestic and foreign flying clubs (in England, Spain, the US, Canada, etc.), and was constantly improving his technique, paying special attention to autorotation landings. The Robinson R44 and Robinson R66 were Farikh's main helicopters.

Однако, гены действительно существуют, и уже в совершенно зрелом возрасте 48-летним пенсионером я пришёл в авиаклуб учиться летать. На вертолёте. Почему на вертолёте? Да просто вертодром находится рядом с моей дачей. Если бы рядом был аэродром, я бы стал летать на самолёте или на планере — но летать бы начал непременно.

— Mikhail Farikh
Translation:

However, genes do exist and, being of quite a mature age, a pensioner of 48, I went to the flying club to start flight training. Helicopters. Why helicopters? Simply because there was a heliport near my summer house. If it had been an airfield, I would be flying airplanes or gliders, but I would still have started, without a doubt.

— Translated by wikipedians

Without commercial flights or training student pilots, Farikh flew 332 hours in 2011 (for a total of 1,340 hours up to 2011) and 425 hours in 2013 (total 2,113 hours). He flew more than 2,100 hours in the six years after he began training. Later Farikh flew airplanes, licensed for "Single-engine land-based plane". He also flew gliders and other types of aircraft.

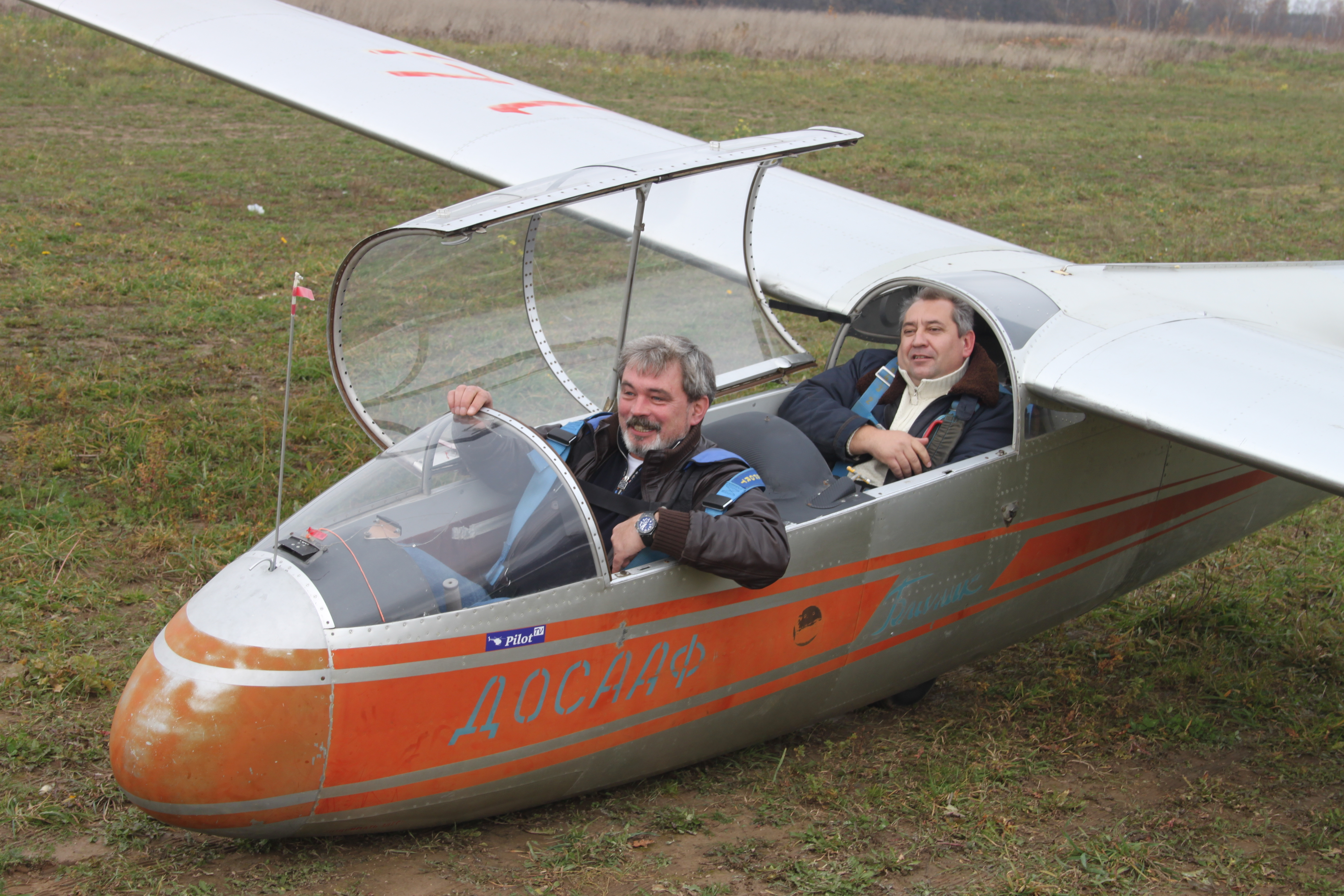
Mikhail Farikh after his first flight on a glider in 2012.

After major reforms to Russian aviation legislation in 2010, he mastered the new flight rules and helped other pilots to do so. In 2012, he was the first Russian private pilot to cross the border of Russia in a helicopter under the new rules for foreign flights.

In 2010 and 2013 he organized the Robinson Safety Course (on safe piloting) in Moscow, and a workshop led by the British pilot Quentin Smith, nicknamed "Captain Q", on operating the Robinson R44 in the cold months of the year and under ever-changing weather conditions. Quentin is considered to be one of the most experienced Robinson R44 pilots; he twice went around the world by helicopter and became the first pilot in aviation history who landed a piston helicopter on both the North and South Poles. Between September 22 and 26, Mikhail Farikh and Dmitry Rakitsky carried out a speed-record-breaking flight from Moscow to Sakhalin. The FAI registered three records for this four-day flight.

=== Volunteer air rescuer ===
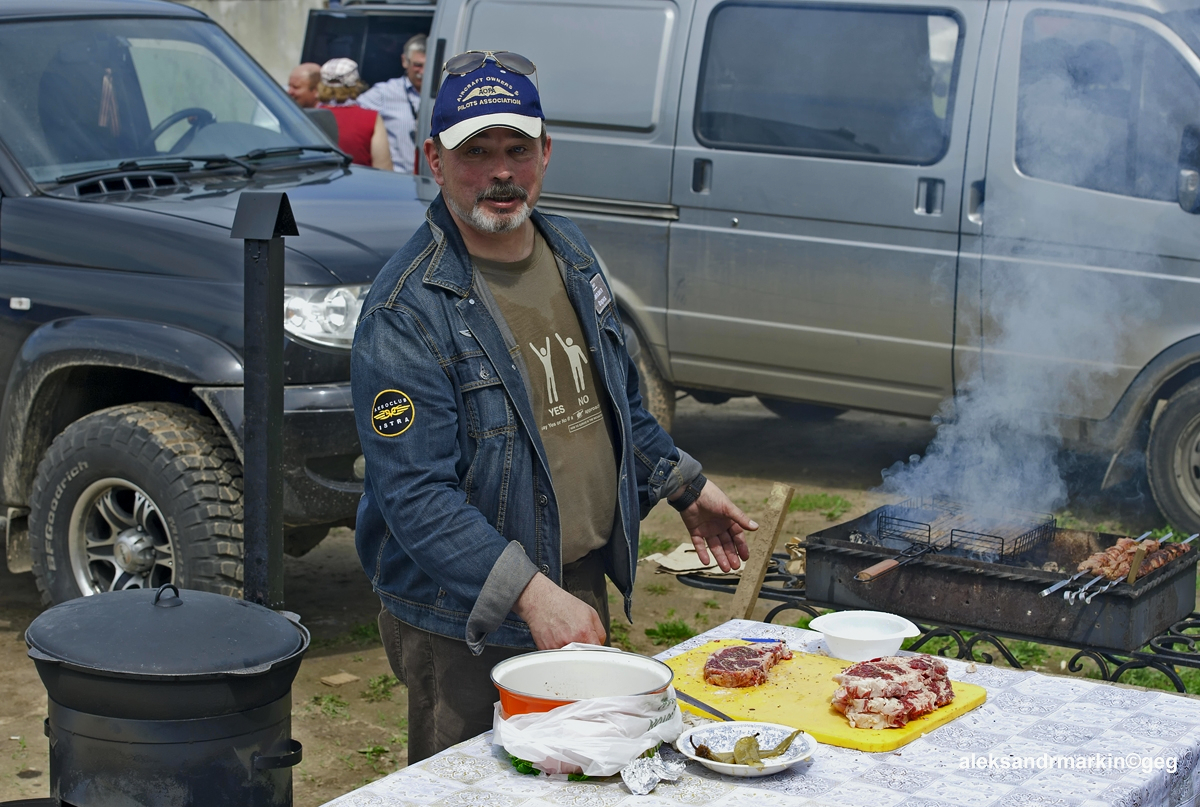
Mikhail Farikh cooking meat at an airshow

Farikh was one of the first pilots in Russia who helped rescue people who had become lost in the woods. In 2011, he took part in four search-and-rescue operations in cooperation with the Liza Alert volunteer organization. He flew for a total of about 15 hours This initiative led to the formation of the Angel helicopter search-and-rescue detachment, which now comprises over 90 people. Farikh continued to take part in rescues and joint exercises. He was posthumously awarded the badge of honor of the Angel helicopter search-and-rescue detachment. In addition to searching for people (mushroom gatherers, tourists, etc.), he participated in search-and-rescue operations aimed at searching for crews of aircraft in distress. He vigorously advocated the mandatory use of satellite trackers (SPOT, inReach, etc.), which make it possible to find aircraft following accidents.

=== Flight to the North Pole ===
In 2013, he reached the North Pole as a crew member with PIC Dmitrii Rakitsky, flying the Moscow — North Pole — Moscow route. The crew was the first in the world to make that flight with the Robinson R66 light helicopter. Flights past the Arctic Circle were also performed for scientific purposes. During the flight, with the participation of the polar explorer Oleg Prodan, they placed radio buoys at the location where the schooner Svyataya Anna from the Brusilov Expedition was wrecked, so as to determine the direction of ice drift, which might make it possible to discover the ship itself.

=== Around-the-world flight ===
The first attempt to fly around the world in 2012 did not move beyond the preparatory stage, as the US aviation authorities issued a NOTAM, according to which aircraft of several countries, including those registered in Russia, were not cleared for flights under the VFR over American territory.

In 2013 the around-the-world flight attempt met with success. It was carried out by two Robinson R66s, flown by Farikh and Dmitrii Rakitsky, Alexander Kurylev, and Vadim Melnikov. Cameraman and film director Dmitrii Kubasov traveled the whole way with the pilots. This was the first around-the-world helicopter flight in Russian history.

=== Other aviation activity ===
As an active member of the Russian aviation community and representative of AOPA Russia, Farikh developed relationships with government agencies and regulatory bodies and participated in various events with other GA pilots. He also took part in various air shows and events — Vertoslet, the travel-media PereDvizheniye Festival, and others.

In 2015, under Farikh's leadership, a group of five helicopters (the crew of one of them containing representatives from the US, Britain, and Russia) visited three poles — the magnetic pole, the geographic pole, and the pole of inaccessibility.

In 2015, at the annual conference of AOPA Russia, he presented the Pilot of the Year award in his capacity as the King of Arms of the organization.

Also in 2015, Farikh took part in a successful attempt to set the Guinness World Record for the largest helicopter formation.

Farikh did a lot to make flights in which he did not take part possible, by sharing experience with others, rendering organizational assistance, and following his colleagues’ flights closely.

One of the biggest projects undertaken with Farikh's assistance was the 2014 Moscow — New Zealand — Moscow flight headed by Evgeny Kabanov. Farikh also played a big role in the 2015 attempt by Sergey Ananov to carry out a solo around-the-world flight in a Robinson R22.

=== Death ===
Mikhail Farikh talks about the goal of the last expedition. Recorded on the day of the catastrophe — April 18, 2016.

Mikhail Farikh died on April 18, 2016 during the second helicopter expedition in search of the Svyataya Anna gun-vessel. The fatal crash occurred at 22:06 local time (17:06 UTC) at 73°19′40″N 69°59′37″E Oleg Prodan, polar explorer and director of the Onezhskoye Pomorye National Park, and Alexei Frolov, founder and owner of the Mirital company, also died. All three men held private pilot licenses with the helicopter pilot entry.

A group of three Robinson R66 helicopters participating in the "Searching for the Two Captains" expedition was flying along the route from Amderma Airport to the landing site on Bely Island in the Kara Sea. While they were approaching the island, thick, low cloud cover formed. The crew of the formation leader decided to descend into the clouds to determine their lower boundary and see if it was possible to land. While carrying out this mission, the helicopter crashed.

The IAC board's report states that "the most probable cause of the R66 RA-06233 helicopter's crash was the PIC's loss of flight altitude control during the attempt to establish visual contact with terrain under weather conditions that did not comply with VFR and the pilot's experience level, which led to the aircraft's collision with the icy surface of the Kara Sea".

A large crowd paid its last respects to the deceased crew in the memorial hall of the Troyekurovskoye Cemetery on April 24, 2016. Mikhail Farikh is buried at the Novodevichy Cemetery in Moscow, Alexei Frolov is buried at the Zvyaginskoe cemetery (Moscow region), while Oleg Prodan was buried in at his birthplace in Rybinsk, along with his parents.

== Memorialization ==
In recognition of Farikh's contributions to the development of sound-system competitions, the National Association of Automobile Audio Competitions, АМТ Eurasia, declared the 2016 season the Season in Memory of Mikhail Farikh.

In spring 2017, work to memorialize convoy BD-5 and the crew of the lost R66 on Belyi Island was undertaken. On March 17, 2017, a large wooden cross was installed on the island at 73.332373°N 70.067851°E with the support of the non-profit partnership Arctic Development Center. A month later, on April 13, 2017, an AOPA Russia air expedition attached a plaque describing the crash to the cross.

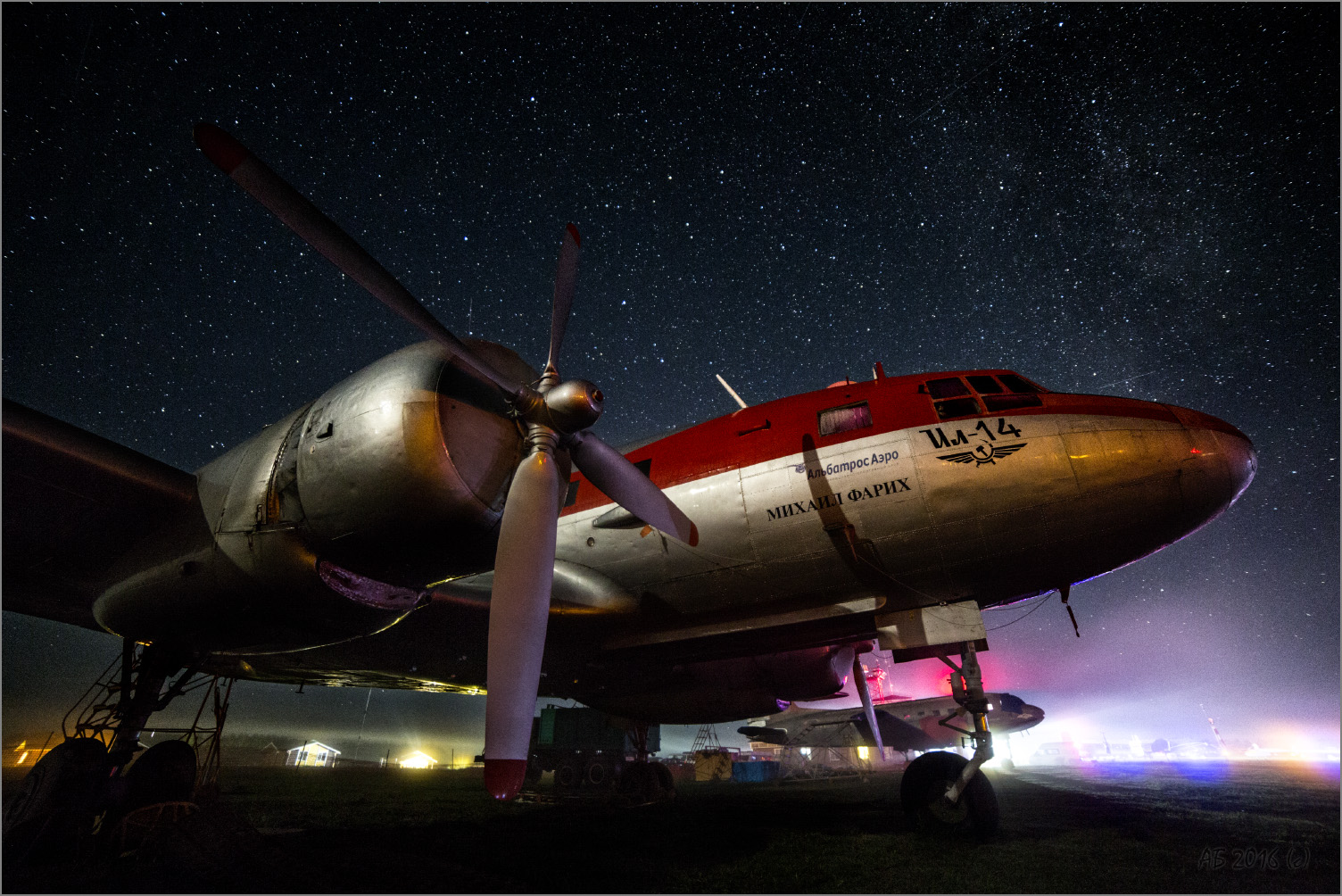
An Il-14 "Penguin" named after Mikhail Farikh

In 2016, an Il-14 Penguin restored to airworthy condition by enthusiasts was named after Mikhail Farikh.

== World records ==
Farikh set three speed records along these routes in the class of piston helicopters with MTOW of 1,000 to 1,750 kg:

- Istra, Moscow Region (Bunkovo) — Tyumen: 173.04 km/h — currently valid world record.
- Istra, Moscow Region (Bunkovo — Krasnoyarsk: 99.34 km/h — currently valid world record.
- Istra, Moscow Region (Bunkovo — Yuzhno-Sakhalinsk: 66.15 km/h — currently valid world record.

== Awards ==
FAI Air Sport Medal. This medal is awarded to individuals or groups for "prominent services to the cause of air sports; for instance, work on FAI committees, the organization of world or continental championships, training of new pilots, or development of aviation as a whole, particularly if this is aimed at the involvement of young people in air sports."

The text of the FAI nomination:

An experienced pilot and adventurer, a participant in search and rescue air operations. An aerial sports competitor. A member of numerous helicopter flights in Russia and around the world, including a trip to the North Pole as a member of a scientific expedition in April 2013, and a transatlantic flight in 2009. In 2012, he established three world speed records on the Robinson R44 helicopter en route from Moscow to Sakhalin. A member of the first world helicopter flight in the history of Russian aviation, in August–September 2013. For active work to improve safety and air legislation development, for active participation in training of flight personnel. For active promotion of aviation sports in Russia.

- «Helicopter Industry Association» award winner (2003 y). Nomination "Sportsmen of the year".

== Links ==
Media related to Mikhail Farikh at Wikimedia Commons

- “Searching for the Two Captains” expedition facebook page
