= Vagn Peitersen =

Danish hockey player

Personal information
- Nationality: Danish
- Born: 11 January 1925 Copenhagen, Denmark
- Died: 12 April 2016 (aged 91) Copenhagen, Denmark

Sport
- Sport: Field hockey

Vagn Peitersen (11 January 1925 – 12 April 2016) was a Danish field hockey player. He competed in the men's tournament at the 1960 Summer Olympics.
