= Chen Shilu =

Chinese scientist

- 陈士橹
- Born: 24 September 1920; Dongyang, Zhejiang, China
- Died: 24 April 2016 (aged 95); Xi'an, Shaanxi, China
- Education: National Southwestern Associated University; Moscow Aviation Institute
- Scientific career
- Fields: Flight mechanics
- Workplaces: Northwestern Polytechnical University

Chen Shilu (Chinese: 陈士橹; pinyin: Chén Shìlǔ; 24 September 1920 – 24 April 2016) was a Chinese flight mechanics expert, educator and an academician of the Chinese Academy of Engineering (CAE).

== Biography ==
Chen was born in Dongyang County, Zhejiang. He obtained a bachelor's degree of aeronautical engineering from National Southwestern Associated University in 1945. He became a teaching assistant in National Southwestern Associated University (1945–1946) and Tsinghua University (1946–1948) after his graduation. He taught at National Chiao Tung University as a lecturer in 1948. Chen moved to Eastern China Aeronautics Institute in 1952 due to the adjustment for university colleges and departments in China. He went to Soviet Union in 1956 by the Chinese government sponsorship and obtained a master's degree from Moscow Aviation Institute in 1958.

Chen returned to Northwestern Polytechnical University^{[Note 1]} and founded the Department of Aerospace Engineering in 1959. Chen's research was mainly in the field of flight mechanics and fostered China's first and second doctors in flight mechanics. He became the foreign academician of Russian Academy of Astronautics on 29 March 1994. On 24 November 1997, Chen was elected as an academician of the Chinese Academy of Engineering for his achievements in flight mechanics.

Chen died on 24 April 2016 at the age of 95 in Xi'an.

== Notes ==
^{^[Note 1]}Eastern China Aeronautics Institute was relocated to Xi'an and renamed as the Xi'an Aeronautics Institute in 1956. Xi'an Aeronautics Institute was merged to form the Northwestern Polytechnical University in 1958.
