= Raphaël Nadé =

Ivorian-French footballer (born 1980)

Personal information
- Full name: Raphaël Nadé
- Date of birth: 18 October 1980 (age 46)
- Place of birth: Abidjan, Ivory Coast
- Height: 6 ft 3 in (1.91 m)
- Positions: Midfielder; winger; striker

Youth career
- Le Havre

Senior career*
Years	Team	Apps	(Gls)
1999–2001	Troyes	3	(0)
2001–2002	Hampton & Richmond Borough	17	(5)
2002	Welling United	10	(2)
2002–2005	Woking	100	(18)
2005–2007	Carlisle United	22	(2)
2006	→ Weymouth (loan)	17	(13)
2006–2007	→ Weymouth (loan)	37	(6)
2007–2008	Ebbsfleet United	34	(4)
- * Club domestic league appearances and goals as of 16:58, 1 June 2008 (UTC)

Raphaël Nadé (born 18 October 1980) is a French-Ivorian former professional footballer.

Nadé started his career at French outfit Le Havre before joining Troyes. He then joined non-league English sides Hampton & Richmond Borough and Welling United, before joining Woking in 2002.

Before the 2005–06 season he signed for Carlisle United for an undisclosed fee, as they club embarked on their first season back in the Football League. When Michael Bridges joined Carlisle, Nadé lost his place in the team and so went on loan to Weymouth, scoring 13 goals as Weymouth secured promotion to the Conference National. On 31 July 2006 Nadé rejoined Weymouth on a season long loan. On 18 May 2007, Nadé terminated his contract with Carlisle.

On 4 July 2007 he joined Ebbsfleet United. He was released at the end of the 2007–08 season.

== Honours ==
Carlisle United

- Football League Two: 2005–06
