= Chuck Waseleski =

American baseball statistician

Charles "Chuck" Waseleski (November 30, 1954 – April 7, 2016) was an American pioneering sabermetrician from Massachusetts.

Waseleski was called "the czar of hardball software" by Boston Globe sportswriter Dan Shaughnessy, but was most famously known in Boston as "The Maniacal One", a sobriquet often seen on the sports pages of the Globe. The nickname, coined by Steve Fainaru and continued in use by Gordon Edes, Peter Gammons, and Nick Cafardo, honored Waseleski's extreme attention to detail.

Waseleski, more a statistics compiler than an analyst, kept track for many years of every pitch and every ball in play of every Boston Red Sox game, during the early days of sabermetrics when this data was not routinely compiled.

Waseleski did not practice sabermetrics as a full-time profession (he worked for an engineering consulting firm), although he did publish monthly and seasonal reports for a while and was employed by sports agents, and excerpts of his work appeared in works by Bill James and in Globe newspaper columns beginning in the 1980s.
