= Geoff Vanderfeen =

Australian rules footballer

Personal information
- Full name: Geoffrey William Vanderfeen
- Born: 25 February 1930
- Died: 4 April 2016 (aged 86)
- Original team: Yarraville / Buxton
- Height: 183 cm (6 ft 0 in)
- Weight: 85 kg (187 lb)

Playing career^{1}
Years	Club	Games (Goals)
1948–51	Footscray	13 (0)
- ^{1} Playing statistics correct to the end of 1951.

Geoffrey William Vanderfeen (25 February 1930 – 4 April 2016) is a former Australian rules footballer who played with Footscray in the Victorian Football League (VFL).
