= Martin Szipál =

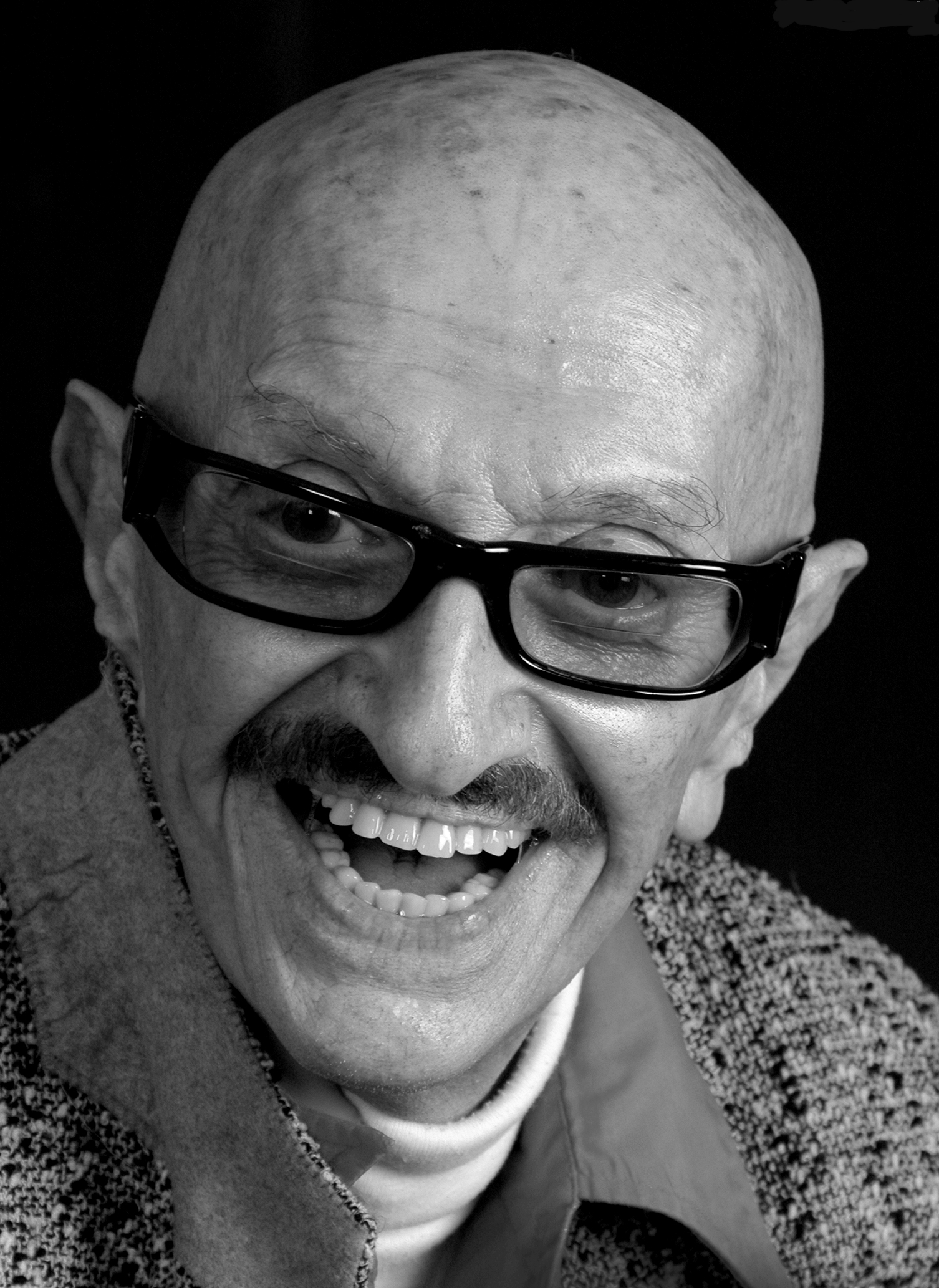
- Born: Szipál Márton; May 6, 1924; Szolnok, Hungary
- Died: April 26, 2016 (aged 91); Budapest, Hungary
- Occupation: Photographer

Martin Szipál (born Szipál Márton; 6 May 1924 – 26 April 2016), also known as Martin S. Martin, was a Hungarian American photographer, most noted for his portrait photography of movie stars and celebrities.

== Biography ==
Szipál was born in Szolnok on May 6, 1924 as the son of royal photographer Márton Károly Szipál (1893–1966) and Margit Szepessy (1895–1960). He spent his childhood in Debrecen, then the family moved to Budapest. Taught photography in Munich, Szipál took his qualification exam in 1942. He participated in World War II as a combat pilot of the Royal Hungarian Air Force, later fell into Soviet captivity.

Photo of Radics Endre, a dancer, taken by Szipál Martin in 1994

After the war, he established his first photographic studio in Debrecen in 1946. He joined the Photographer Cooperative of Budapest in 1953. He was a founding member of the Artistic Photographers' Association of Debrecen in 1954. During the Hungarian Revolution of 1956, Szipál fled the country, settling and working in the United States. He submitted his photographs to various newspapers and exhibitions as a freelance contributor. After establishing a studio in Hollywood, Szipál began to photograph such celebrities as John Wayne, Tommy Lee Jones, Leslie Nielsen, Tracy Nelson, Charlene Tilton, Margaux Hemingway, Timothy Hutton, Priscilla Presley and Kareem Abdul-Jabbar. He also became a frequent contributor to magazines and periodicals, providing magazine cover portraits of some of the most popular stars.

Szipál returned to Hungary in 1997, where he worked for newspapers and taught in several photographer schools. He died of prostate cancer in his home in Budapest on April 26, 2016, just before turning 92.

== Publications ==
- The Hollywood Years. Panda Digital, Los Angeles, 1997
- Sztárok sztárfotós szemmel. Hanga Kiadó, Budapest, 2004
