= John Ferrone =

American book editor

John Robert Ferrone (August 14, 1924 – April 10, 2016) was an American book editor. He edited The Collected Stories of Eudora Welty and The Color Purple.

== Life ==
He was born in Morristown, New Jersey and was raised in Rockaway Boro, New Jersey by his Italian immigrant parents. He served in World War II on Guam. He graduated from Colorado College and Stanford University. He worked for Dell Publishing and Harcourt, Brace & World. He retired in 1990. He was an editor to Anaïs Nin, Alice Walker, Eudora Welty, C.S. Lewis, Janet Flanner, and James Beard, for whom he served as literary executor. His partner for 43 years was the South African diplomat and United Nations employee Johan Theron, who died in 2002.

Alice Walker's letters are at Emory University. Eudora Welty's letters are at The Dobkin Family Collection of Feminism.
