= Robert Dolan (marine geologist) =

American geologist (1929–2016)

Robert 'Bob' Dolan
- Born: Robert Giles Dolan; April 5, 1929; Los Angeles, California, U.S.
- Died: April 24, 2016 (aged 87); Charlottesville, Virginia

Robert Dolan (April 5, 1929 – April 24, 2016) was a professor of Coastal Geology at the University of Virginia. Born in Los Angeles, California, he received his a BS from Southern Oregon College in 1955 (now Southern Oregon University, a MA in zoology from Oregon State University in 1957 and a PhD from Louisiana State University. With the help of Robert E. Davis was the co-creator of the Dolan/Davis Scale for Nor'easter This is a scale for rating the severity of northeasters. Like the Saffir-Simpson scale for hurricanes, it classifies northeasters in five categories of intensity. The categories for northeasters are based on the combination of two factors: wave height and duration of the storm.

He received a Distinguished Professor award from the University of Virginia in 1991 and received the Outstanding Alumnus Award from Southern Oregon College and the Significant Contributions to the Science Program by the Department of the Interior in 1987. He served as the associate editor, Journal of Coastal Research, and was a member of Sigma Xi, American Shore and Beach Association and the American Geophysical Union.

He died in Charlottesville, Virginia at the age of 87 on April 24, 2016.
