= John Zemanek =

John Zemanek (1921 - April 18, 2016) was an American architect. He taught at the University of Houston beginning in 1964 and was a Fellow of the American Institute of Architects (FAIA), a distinguished educator, and architect.
