= Nade Haley =

American artist (1947–2016)

Nade Calmes Haley
- Born: December 13, 1947; Greenville, South Carolina, United States
- Died: April 21, 2016 (aged 68); Brooklyn, New York, US
- Education: Atlanta College of Art; Washington University in St. Louis
- Known for: installation, sculpture, public art, drawing
- Awards: National Endowment for the Arts, Yaddo, MacDowell Colony

Nade Haley (December 13, 1947 – April 21, 2016) was an American visual artist whose work has been exhibited at museums and galleries, and is held in public and private collections. After relocating from Washington DC, Haley lived and kept studios in New York City and in Cape Breton, Nova Scotia.

== Awards ==
The artist received three grants from the National Endowment for the Arts, and two Rhode Island state Council for the Arts grants. She received residency fellowships from the MacDowell Colony and Yaddo.

== Education ==
Haley received a BFA from the Atlanta College of Art and an MFA from the Sam Fox School of Design & Visual Arts at Washington University in St. Louis.

== Teaching ==
Haley taught art for over three decades. Between 1983 and 2016, the artist held the position of Professor of Spatial Dynamics in the Department of Experimental and Foundational Studies at the Rhode Island School of Design, where her pedagogy was influenced by the natural world and biophilia. Prior to teaching at RISD, she held appointments at Washington University in St. Louis, Western Michigan University and Montgomery College.

== Exhibitions ==
Haley's sculptural works referenced the complex systems of language, thought, and vision. Janet Goleas, curator of the permanent collection at the Islip Art Museum has written on the exhibition, Nade Haley: Light and Shadow, featured in the permanent collection, "Alongside this notion of cause and effect, Haley has kept a keen eye on the mutability of rational thinking, and she routinely questions organized systems of thought such as religion or the physical sciences, or the natural order of things such as bird migration and other phenomena."

Haley's installation art uses light, reflection and shadows to create environments that reference phenomena in nature. The etched glass installation, Falling, at the Islip Museum, "cast shadows of birds in flight" (Susan Hoeltzel, Director of the Lehman College Museum.) The sculptural installation, Curved Space, was shown at the Corcoran Gallery, Washington DC. The installation won first prize in the Corcoran Area Exhibition. Her show, 406, at Diane Brown Gallery combined "drawing in space" and a sculptural grid to create "lines of shadow" in the composition.

New York Times writer, Vivien Raynor, described Haley's 40-foot long outdoor sculpture at Storm King Art Center as "the skeleton of a boat overturned, except that it has A-shaped members that are extended downward, enabling it to stand several feet off the ground."

Between 1977 and 2016, Haley exhibited artwork in over one hundred group exhibitions, and fifteen solo shows, including Brooklyn Museum, Katonah Museum of Art, Artpark Gallery, Lewiston, New York; the Islip Art Museum, East Islip, New York; the RISD Museum of Art, Washington Project for the Arts in Washington DC, Gray Art Gallery, Greenville, North Carolina, and SculptureCenter, New York City, among other venues.

== Public art ==
Haley created permanent, public art works including a commission from the U.S. General Services Administration Art-in-Architecture Program for the Des Moines Federal Building. She was awarded a New York Percent for Art commission for the Multi-media Center at CUNY Lehman College. The 900-square foot permanent installation, Outside In, at Lehman included impressionistic photographs of trees and coaxial cables encased between glass panels, melding the technological realm with the natural world. The artist created a 25-foot public sculpture in Washington, DC. At Socrates Sculpture Park in Queens, New York, Haley produced Inversion (1992), a large-scale concrete gateway installation.

== Collections ==
Haley's work is included in public collections including the Lehniner Institut, Brandenburg, Germany; Columbia Museum of Art, Columbia, South Carolina; and the Islip Art Museum, Long Island, NY; and Phillip Morris Corporation. Her work is held in several private collections in the United States and Europe.

== Selected reviews ==
• Forgey, Benjamin. Art News. (September 1980), p. 88.
• Tannous, David. Art in America. (November 1980), pp. 41–43.
• True, Shirley. New Art Examiner. (December 1980), p. 15.
• Lewis, Jo Ann. Art News. (March 1981), p. 189.
• Nadelman, Cynthia. "Nade Haley," Arts Magazine, (May 1988), p. 94.
• Grimes, Nancy. New Art Examiner. (March 1989), p. 52.
• Braff, Phyllis. The New York Times. (November 4, 1990).
• Melrod, George. Sculpture, Volume 12, No. 4. (July–August 1993), pp. 55–56.
• Johnson, Ken. The New York Times. Friday. (January 10, 2003), p. E47.
