= April (given name) =

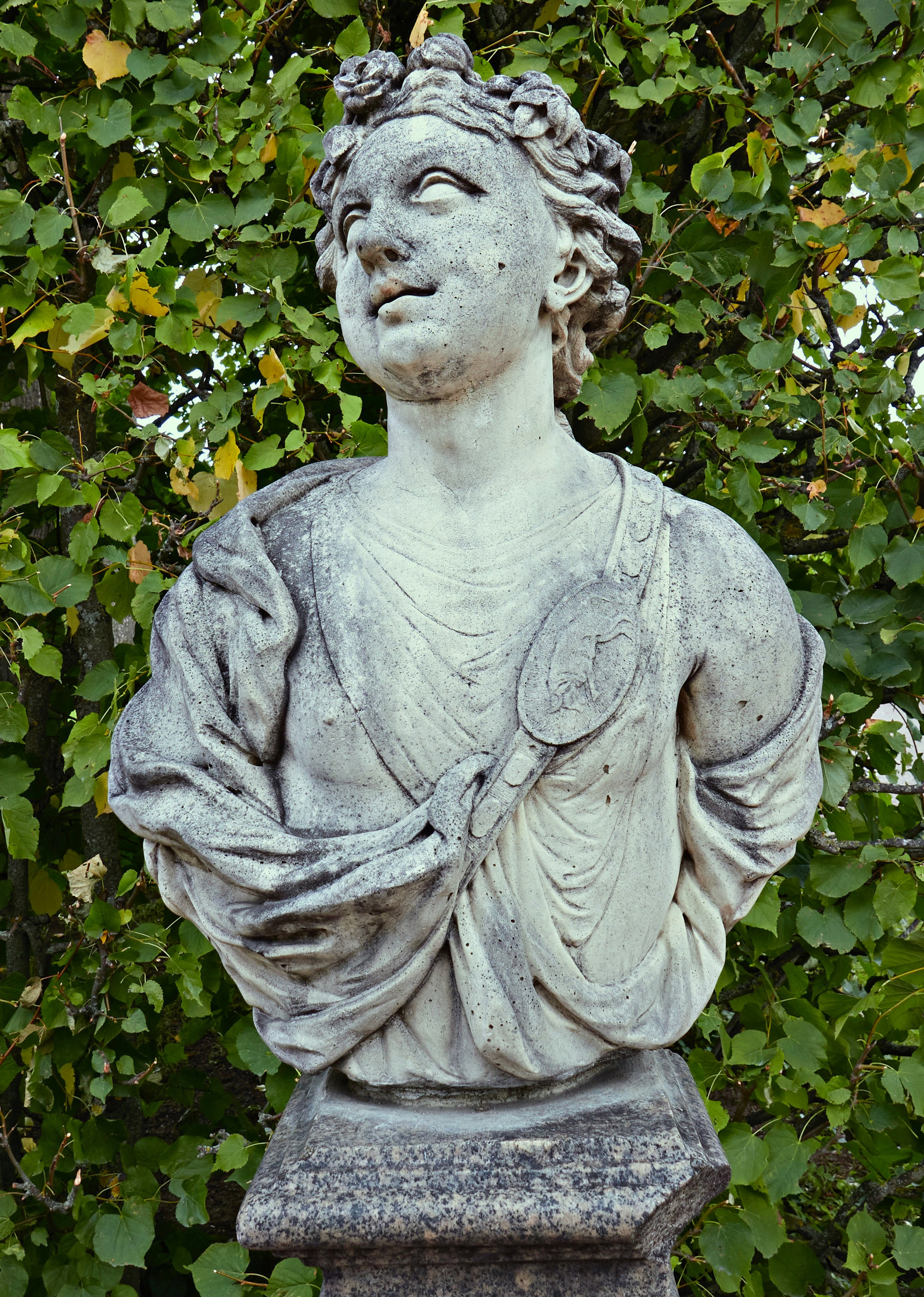
- Allegory of April bust in Catherine Park
- Pronunciation: /ˈeɪ.pɹəl/
- Gender: Female

Origin
- Origin: Latin
- Meaning: Bloom

Other names
- Related names: Avril

April is a feminine given name taken from the month of the same name. It was the most popular month name given to girls in the United States between 1960 and 2000. It was most well used in the Southern United States, where the spring season begins earlier than other regions of the country. The name is believed to have been particularly well-used because April is a month associated with renewal. The name has since declined in usage in English-speaking countries, but remains in regular use.

Notable people with the name include:

== People ==
- April Adams (born 1973), Australian diver
- April Ashley (1935–2021), English model, and transgender equality campaigner
- April Baker-Bell, American academic and non-fiction writer
- April Baskin, American politician
- April D. Beldo (born 1964), American navy sailor
- April A. Benasich, American neuroscientist
- April Berg (born 1974), American politician
- April Bernard (born 1956), American poet
- April Bey, American artist
- April Blair, American producer and screenwriter
- April Bloomfield (born 1974), British chef
- April Bowlby (born 1980), American actress
- April Boy Regino (1961–2020), Filipino musician
- April Brandley (born 1990), Australian professional netball player
- April Brockman - Del Monte (born 1986), Canadian reality television personality, author, and realtor
- April Brown, American electrical engineer and materials scientist
- April Bulmer (born 1963), Canadian poet
- April Byron (1947–2019), Australian pop singer and songwriter
- April Cantelo (1928–2024), English soprano
- April Capone Almon (born c. 1975), American businesswoman and politician
- April Carrión (born 1989), Puerto Rican drag queen and television personality
- April Carson, American epidemiologist
- April Carter (1937–2022), British peace activist
- April Charney, American consumer advocate and consumer attorney
- April Christofferson, American author and former attorney
- April Daniels, American television personality
- April Daniels (author), American author
- April Daye (born 1937), American former burlesque dancer, fine arts painter, recording artist, and jazz singer
- April De Angelis (born 1960), English dramatist of part Sicilian descent
- April DeConick, American religion academic and biblical scholar
- April Diamond (born 1986), American singer
- April Dunn (1986–2020), American disability rights activist
- April Fabb (born 1955), English missing girl
- April Fairfield, American politician
- April Ferry (born 1932), American costume designer
- April FitzLyon (1920–1998), English translator, biographer, and historian
- April Flores, American actress
- April Fronzoni (born 1982), American field hockey striker
- April Gaede, American writer and activist for National Vanguard, a white nationalist organization
- April Genevieve Tucholke, American author
- April Glaspie (born 1942), American diplomat
- April Gornik (born 1953), American artist
- April Goss (born 1993), American football placekicker
- April Greiman (born 1948), American designer
- April H. Foley (born 1947), American diplomat
- April Hadi (born 1981), Indonesian footballer
- April Halprin Wayland (born 1954), American author, poet, and teacher
- Underscores (born 2000, April Harper Grey), American singer-songwriter and producer
- April Haney (born 1969), American former actress, singer, and counselor
- April Heinrichs (born 1964), American soccer player and coach
- April Henry (born 1959), American author
- April Hickox (1955–2025), Canadian artist, photographer, teacher, and curator
- April Holmes (born 1973), American Paralympic athlete
- April Hunter (born 1971), American professional wrestler, professional wrestling valet, boxer, actress, writer, fitness model, and glamour model
- April Ieremia (born 1967), New Zealand former netball player and television host
- April Ivy (born 1999), Portuguese singer-songwriter
- April Jace (1974–2014), American masters track and field athlete
- April Jeanette Mendez (born 1987), American professional wrestler who went by the ring name AJ Lee
- April Jones (2007–2012), Welsh murder victim
- April Kelly, American television writer and producer
- April Kihlstrom, American genre novelist
- April Lacy (1982–1996), American murder victim
- April Lawlor, Irish pop singer and songwriter
- April Lawton (1948–2006), American guitarist and composer
- April Lee, American artist
- April Lee Hernández (born 1980), American film and television actress
- April Macie (born 1976), American comedian, television personality, writer, and actress
- April Maiya, American film producer, director, and fashion designer
- April March (born 1965), American singer-songwriter and animator
- April March (dancer), American exotic dancer and burlesque performer
- April Margera (born 1956), American television personality known as the mother of Jackass/Viva La Bam star Bam Margera
- April Masini (born 1964), American stage- and television actress, advice columnist, and writer
- April Matson (born 1981), American actress and singer
- April Baskin, American politician
- April McMahon (born 1964), British academic administrator and linguist
- April Meservy, American singer-songwriter, multi-instrumentalist, and record producer
- April Mullen, Canadian actress and director
- April Ngatupuna (born 2003), New Zealand rugby league and rugby union footballer
- April Olrich (1931–2014), Tanzania-born English ballerina and actress
- April O'Neil (born 1987), American adult film actress
- April Ossmann, American poet, teacher, and editor
- April Palmieri, American photographer and musician
- April Parker Jones, American television actress
- April Partridge (born c. 1993), British chef
- April Pearson (born 1989), English actress
- April Phillips (born 1954), English actress, writer, singer, director, and film- and theatre producer
- April Phumo (1937–2011), South African footballer and coach
- April Rapier (born 1978), American photographer
- April Reign, American activist journalist
- April Richardson (born 1979), American stand-up comedian
- April Rose, several people
- April Ross (born 1982), American professional beach volleyball player
- April Ross Perez (born 1981), Filipino fashion model and beauty queen
- April Ryan (born 1967), American reporter, author, and correspondent
- April Samuels (born 1969), American rock drummer, songwriter, speaker, author, and philanthropist
- April Sanders, Canadian educator, physician, and politician
- April Sargent (born 1968), American ice dancer
- April Saul (born 1955), American journalist
- April Scott (born 1979), American actress and former model
- April Smith, several people
- April Steiner Bennett (born 1980), American pole vaulter
- April Stevens (1929–2023), American singer
- April Stewart (born 1969), American voice actress
- April Stone, American basket weaver
- April Summers (born 1988), English glamour model
- April Sunami (born 1980), American artist
- April Sykes (born 1990), American professional basketball player
- April Telek (born 1975), Canadian actress
- April Tinsley (1980–1988), American murder victim
- April Ulring Larson (born 1950), American Lutheran bishop
- April Underwood, American businesswoman
- April Verch (born 1978), Canadian fiddler, singer, and step dancer
- April Wade (born 1986), American actress and producer
- April Walker (born 1943), English television actress
- April Waters (born 1954), American painter
- April Weaver (born 1971), American politician and nurse
- April Webster, American casting director
- April Wilkerson (born 1987), American YouTuber
- April Winchell (born 1960), American actress, writer, and radio host
- April Wright, American writer, director, and producer

== Fictional characters ==
- April, a duck in the Donald Duck Universe
- April Branning, a character from the BBC soap opera EastEnders
- April Dancer, title character in the 1960s TV series The Girl from U.N.C.L.E.
- April Green, a character from the television show Jericho
- April Kepner, a character from the ABC television medical drama Grey's Anatomy
- April Ludgate, a character in the NBC television comedy Parks and Recreation
- April O'Neil, a character from the Teenage Mutant Ninja Turtles comics and media franchise
- April Rhodes, a character on Glee
- April Ryan, a character from the video game The Longest Journey and its sequel Dreamfall: The Longest Journey
- April Parker, a Marvel Comics character
- April Scott, a character from the Australian soap opera Home and Away
- April Stevens Ewing, a character from the 1980s soap opera Dallas

== See also ==
- Abril
- April (surname)
- Avril (name)
