= Avril (name) =

Avril is a given name and a surname. Measured by absolute frequency, it most often occurs in France, the United Kingdom, South Africa, and the United States.

Notable people with the name include:

== Given name ==
- Avril Anderson (born 1953), English music educator and composer
- Avril Angers (1918–2005), English comedian
- Avril Benoît, Canadian broadcaster
- Avril Bowring (born 1942), English sprinter
- Kim Campbell (born 1947), Avril "Kim" Campbell, Canada's first female prime minister
- Avril Coleridge-Taylor (1903–1998), English pianist, conductor, and composer
- Avril Dankworth (1922–2013), English music educator
- Avril de Sainte-Croix (1855–1939), French author, journalist, feminist, and pacifist
- Avril Doyle (born 1949), Irish politician
- Avril Elgar (1932–2021), English stage, radio and television actress
- Avril Fahey (born 1974), Australian cricketer
- Avril (Frédéric Magnon) (born 1974), French electro-ambient musician
- Avril Haines (born 1969), American lawyer, first female Director of National Intelligence
- Avril Henry (1935–2016), English activist
- Avril Hoare, Irish radio personality
- Avril Joy, British author
- Avril Lavigne (born 1984), Canadian singer-songwriter
- Avril Lennox (born 1956), British gymnast
- Avril Lovelace-Johnson, Ghanaian jurist
- Avril Malan (born 1937), South African rugby union player
- Avril Palmer-Baunack (born 1964), British businesswoman
- Avril Phali (born 1978), South African football player
- Avril Pyman (born 1930), British scholar and Russian literature translator
- Avril (singer) (born 1986), Kenyan singer-songwriter, actress, and entertainer
- Avril Starling (born 1953), English cricketer
- Avril Walker (born 1954), British luger
- Avril Williams (born 1961), South African rugby player

== Surname ==
- Armand Avril (1926–2025), French painter and sculptor
- Cliff Avril (born 1986), American football player
- Édouard-Henri Avril or his pseudonym Paul Avril (1849–1928), French painter
- Étienne Avril (1748–1791), French furniture designer
- Jacky Avril (born 1964), French slalom canoer
- Jane Avril (1868–1943), French dancer
- Margaux Avril (born 1991), French singer
- Philippe Avril (1654–1698?), French explorer
- Prosper Avril (born 1937), Haitian politician
- Yola d'Avril (1906–1984), American actress

== Fictional characters ==
- Avril Incandenza, mother of protagonist Hal Incandenza in the novel Infinite Jest by David Foster Wallace
- Avril Kent, character on Emmerdale
- Avril Kincaid (Quasar), a Marvel Comics superhero

== See also ==
- Abril
- April (given name)
- April (surname)
- Averell
- Averill (disambiguation)
- Avril (disambiguation)
- Averil
