= Averill =

Averill can refer to: Makayla's Man, Greek gods name from 1546

== People ==
=== Surname ===
- Alan Averill (born 1975), Irish musician
- Alfred Averill (1865–1957), 5th Anglican Bishop of Auckland
- Amanda Averill, member of the Beverly Hills Nannies
- Earl Averill (1902–1983), American Major League Baseball player
- Earl Averill Jr. (1931–2015), American baseball player
- Esther Averill (1902–1992), American writer
- Jim Averill (born 1963), American ice hockey player
- John T. Averill (1825–1889), American Civil War officer and U.S. congressional representative from Minnesota
- Leslie Averill (1897–1981), New Zealand soldier
- Mark Averill (fl. 2025), American military officer
- Roger Averill (1809–1883), 31st Lieutenant Governor of Connecticut
- Sarah Averill Wildes (1627–1692), convicted of witchcraft during the Salem witch trials
- Steve Averill (born 1950), Irish graphic artist
- Taylor Averill (born 1992), American volleyball player
- Thomas Fox Averill (born 1949), novelist and academic from Topeka, Kansas
- Walter Averill (1895–1955), New Zealand religious figure

=== Given name ===
- Averill Curdy (fl. 2007), American poet and academic
- Averill Hill (fl. 1803), Irish religious figure
- Averill A. Liebow (1911–1978), American academic

== Places ==
- Averill, Minnesota
- Averill, Vermont
- Averill Park, New York

== Other ==
- A. T. Averill House, house in Cedar Rapids, Iowa
- Averill Elementary School, part of the Lansing School District, Lansing, Michigan
- Averill Peak, mountain summit in Saranac, New York
- Glenn M. and Edith Averill House, house in Cedar Rapids, Iowa

== See also ==
- Averell, a given name and surname
