= Bob April =

Bob, Bobby, Bobbie, Robbie, Robby, Rob, Robert, or similar, surnamed April, may refer to:

== People ==
- Bobby April, Jr. (born 1953), U.S. American football coach, father of Bobby April III
- Bobby April III, U.S. American football coach, son of Bobby April, Jr.

== Characters ==
- Robert "Bob" April, a fictional character from Star Trek, the original captain of USS Enterprise NCC-1701

== See also ==
- April (surname)
- April (disambiguation)
