= Armand Avril =

French painter and sculptor (1926–2025)

- Avril in 2021
- Born: 2 December 1926; Lyon, France
- Died: 1 November 2025 (aged 98); Cotignac, France
- Occupations: Painter, sculptor

Armand Jérôme Avril (French: [aʁmɑ̃ avʁil]; 2 December 1926 – 1 November 2025) was a French painter and sculptor. Self-taught as an artist, he was inspired by African art, by the assembled objects of Louis Pons, and by the art of Gaston Chaissac, among others. Many of his artworks, which defy classification, are held in the permanent exhibition of the Museum of Fine Arts of Lyon.

== Life and career ==
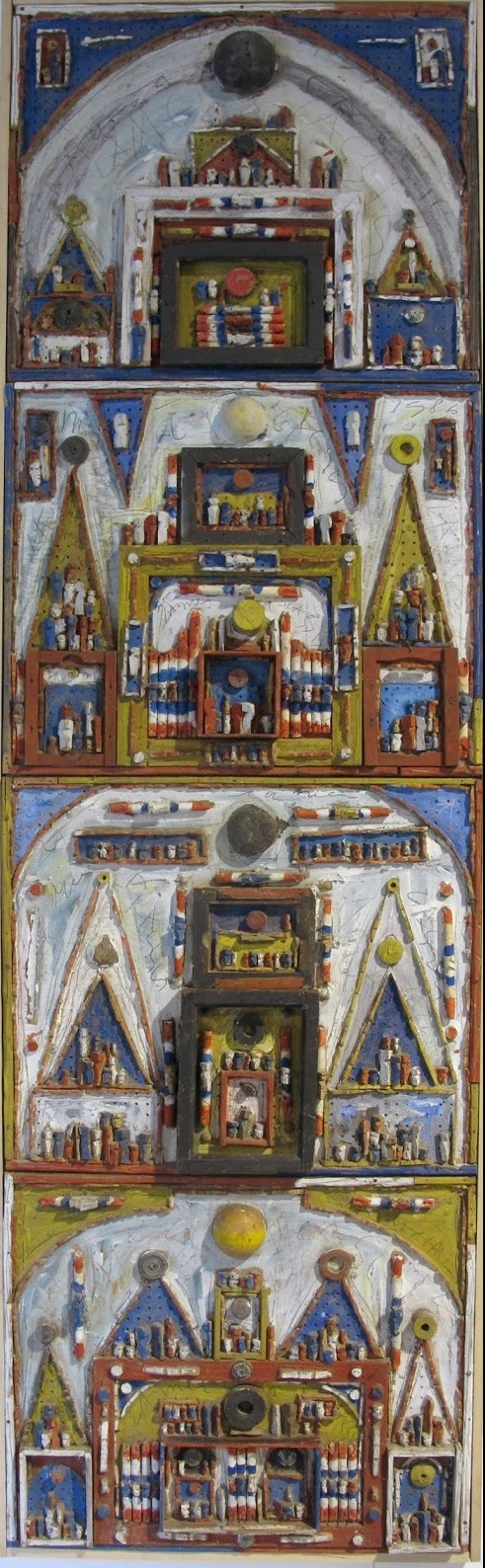
Avril's Mer à Cassis (1986)

Avril was born in Lyon on 2 December 1926; his mother was Corsican and his father from Paris. In the 1940s, he first worked as a plasterer and painter. His father, Marcel Avril, was a painter and a collector of African art, and was also a member of the French Resistance. Marcel Avril was killed by the Gestapo in 1944.

After the war, Avril worked in different fields, including as a plaster-painter. He was self-taught as an artist, copying paintings by artists such as Jean Dufy, Pierre Bonnard and Henri Matisse, at the Museum of Fine Arts of Lyon and the Guimet Museum in Paris. In 1957, he exhibited works in their styles at the Salon du Sud-Est. He joined the Groupe Témoignage and first exhibited at Lyon's Galerie Folklore. As part of the group, he met artists such as Jean Bertholle, Alfred Manessier, César Geoffray, Jean Le Moal, Étienne Martin, and François Stahly.

Avril travelled in Africa in 1960 for a year, where he met Louis Pons, an artist who included assembled objects in his work. Avril also began a new way of expression in assemblages of objects in bas-relief, using waste material and discarded objects such as "bottle caps, clothespins, parts from children's toys, croquet balls, glue, nails and empty tin cans". A critic wrote that he expressed himself through "poetic universe overflowing with humor and vitality".

When he met the art of Gaston Chaissac in Nantes, he was able to convince René Deroudille and Madeleine Rocher, curator at the Museum of Fine Arts of Lyon to exhibit his works there in 1968. In 1973, he created a series of fantasy heads of artists such as Kazimir Malevich, Matisse, Man Ray, Pablo Picasso and Auguste Herbin, as a tribute to Chaissac. In 1975, he released the "Alignement" series, composed of several spherical works assembled into groups. In 1985, an exhibition in a gallery in Vence organized by Alphonse Chave showed his response to Jean Dubuffet and art brut. In 2002, he acquired in Paris Bozo sculptures by fishermen from the banks of the Niger in Mali, colourful and poetic, and matching his own works.

His "Mer à Cassis" series drew inspiration from Wols, based on his experience during World War II. His tapestries bear witness to impressions from a trip to Indonesia with a technique known as ikat.Later in life, he contributed significantly to the Museum of Fine Arts of Lyon, where many works are featured in the permanent exhibition. A large exhibition there was dedicated to his art in 2008.

Avril discovered the village of Cotignac, where he decided to make his residence. Life there changed his art gradually. He ran a workshop in the house, full of objects telling of his universe independent of fashion.

Avril died at home in Cotignac on 1 November 2025, at the age of 98.

== Exhibitions ==
Exhibitions included:

- 2021: Musée d'Art Brut. Montpellier
- 2020: Avril et les Bozo. Centre d'Art La Falaise. Cotignac.
- 2016: Arène-Avril-Valabrègue, Centre d'art contemporain, Chateauvert
- 2010: Galerie Laurent de Puybaudet, Paris
- 2008: Museum of Fine Arts of Lyon
- 2005: Après nous le déluge, Malmaison de Cannes
- 2003: Peintures et assemblages (1962 à 2002), Le Tremblay, Centre National d'Art Contemporain / Musée Municipal de Rabastens
- 2003: Armand Avril, Musée d'Art Naïf – Max Fourny, Paris
- 2002: Donation de Muguette et Paul Dini, et de l'Association Armand Avril, Musée Paul-Dini
- 1993: Espaces Culturels des Tours / Musée Hébert, La Tronche
- 1985: Galerie Alphonse Chave, Vence
- 1984: Maison du Tourisme, Auxerre
- 1983: Maison des expositions, Genas
- 1977: Galerie Pierre Robin, Paris
- 1973: Galerie John Craven, Paris
- 1972: Galerie du Manoir, La Chaux de Fonds (Suisse)
- 1970: Galerie Le Lutriin, Lyon
