= Averil =

Averil is a feminine given name. Notable people with the name include:

- Everilda or Averil, Anglo-Saxon saint of the 7th century
- Averil Beaumont or Margaret Raine Hunt, author
- Averil Cameron (1940–2026), British historian, professor of Late Antique and Byzantine History
- Averil Coxhead, New Zealand linguist
- Averil Ives or Ida Pollock, British writer
- Averil Leimon, author and executive coach
- Averil Margaret Lysaght (1905–1981), New Zealand biologist, science historian, and illustrator
- Dame Averil Olive Bradley (born 1937), known professionally as Averil Mansfield, British vascular surgeon and academic professor, first female professor of surgery in Britain
- Averil Power (born 1978), Irish Fianna Fáil politician
- Lana Morris or Averil Maureen Anita Morris (1930–1998), British actress

== See also ==
- Avril
