= Abril =

Abril is a Portuguese and Spanish name meaning "April".

== People with the given name ==
- Abril Conesa (born 2000), Spanish synchronized swimmer
- Abril Méndez, Venezuelan actress
- Abril Rodríguez (born 1986), Mexican beauty contestant
- Abril Schreiber (born 1990), Venezuelan actress

== People with the surname ==
- Antón García Abril (1933–2021), Spanish composer and musician
- Dolores Abril (1935–2020), Spanish singer and actress
- Erika Abril (born 1978), Colombian Olympic long-distance runner
- Laura Abril (born 1990), Colombian cross-country mountain biker
- Richar Abril (born 1982), Cuban boxer
- Silvia Abril (born 1971), Spanish actress
- Victoria Abril (born 1959), Spanish actress
- Vincent Abril (born 1995), French-Monégasque racing driver
- Xavier Abril (1905–1990), Peruvian poet and essayist
- Julio Abril (born 1971), Cuban businessman and entrepreneur

== See also ==
- April (given name)
- April (surname)
- Avril (name)
- Editora Abril, publisher
- Grupo Abril, Brazilian media group
