= Aprilia (disambiguation) =

Aprilia is an Italian motorcycle manufacturer.

Aprilia may also refer to:

== People ==
- Aprilia Hägglöf (born 1983), Swedish snowboarder
- Aprilia/Aprilio Manganang (born 1992), Indonesian volleyball player who competed as a woman but was later determined to be an intersex male post-retirement
- Aprilia Marzuki, Indonesian judoka who competed in the 2000 Olympics
- Aprilia Yuswandari (born 1988), Indonesian badminton player
- Krisda Putri Aprilia (born 1999), Indonesian karateka
- Riska Aprilia, Indonesian footballer

== Other uses ==
- Aprilia, Lazio, a city in Italy
- Lancia Aprilia, an Italian automobile
- Aprilia Racing, the manufacturer's affiliated motorcycle racing division

== See also ==
- Aprilis
- Aprili (disambiguation)
- April (disambiguation)
