= Olonne-sur-Mer =

Olonne-sur-mer
- Part of Les Sables-d'Olonne
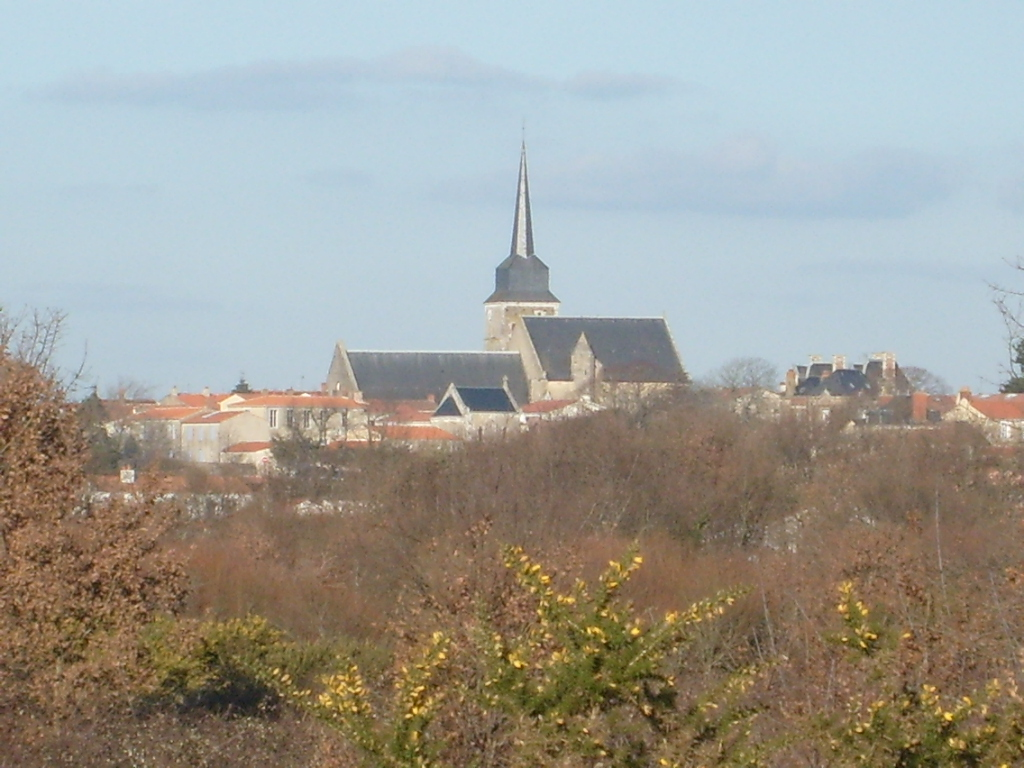
- A general view of Olonne-sur-Mer
- Location of Olonne-sur-mer
- Location within France Location within Pays de la Loire
- Coordinates: 46°32′13″N 1°46′18″W
- Country: France
- Region: Pays de la Loire
- Department: Vendée
- Arrondissement: Les Sables-d'Olonne
- Canton: Les Sables-d'Olonne
- Commune: Les Sables-d'Olonne
- Area^{1}: 45.34 km^{2} (17.51 sq mi)
- Highest elevation: 49 m (161 ft)
- Lowest elevation: 0 m (0 ft)
- Population (2017): 15,061
  - Density: 332.2/km^{2} (860.3/sq mi)
- Time zone: UTC+01:00 (CET)
  - Summer (DST): UTC+02:00 (CEST)
- Postal code: 85340
- ^{1} French Land Register data, which excludes lakes, ponds, glaciers > 1 km^{2} (0.386 sq mi or 247 acres) and river estuaries.

Olonne-sur-Mer (French pronunciation: [ɔlɔn syʁ mɛʁ], literally Olonne on Sea) is a former commune in the Vendée department in the Pays de la Loire region in western France. On 1 January 2019, it was merged into the commune Les Sables-d'Olonne. It is home to the basketball team Pays des Olonnes Basket, which plays its home games at the Salle Beauséjour.

== See also ==
- Communes of the Vendée department
