= Averell =

Averell may refer to:

== Surname ==
- Adam Averell (1754–1847), Irish primitive Wesleyan clergyman
- B. J. Averell (born 1979), Harvard graduate and reality show contestant
- Bobby Averell (born 1947), Northern Irish footballer
- Jim Averell (1851–1889), fabled Old West homesteader
- John Averell (died 1771), Irish bishop
- Mary Williamson Averell (1851–1932), American philanthropist
- William W. Averell (1832–1900), U.S. cavalry general in the American Civil War

== Given name ==
- W. Averell Harriman (1891–1986), former governor of New York and United States Ambassador to the Soviet Union and Britain
- Averell Smith, American political advisor

== Fictional character ==
- Averell Dalton, the largest one of The Daltons

== See also ==
- Averill (disambiguation)
- Avril (name)
