= Kihlstrom =

Kihlstrom (sometimes spelled Kihlström) is a surname. Notable people with this surname include:

- April Kihlstrom, American novelist
- Dan Kihlström (born 1957), Swedish politician
- Ingemar Kihlström (born 1966), Swedish politician
- John Kihlstrom (born 1948), American psychologist
- Mats Kihlström (born 1964), Swedish hockey player
- Thomas Kihlström (born 1948), Swedish badminton player
