= Château-d'Olonne =

- Part of Les Sables-d'Olonne
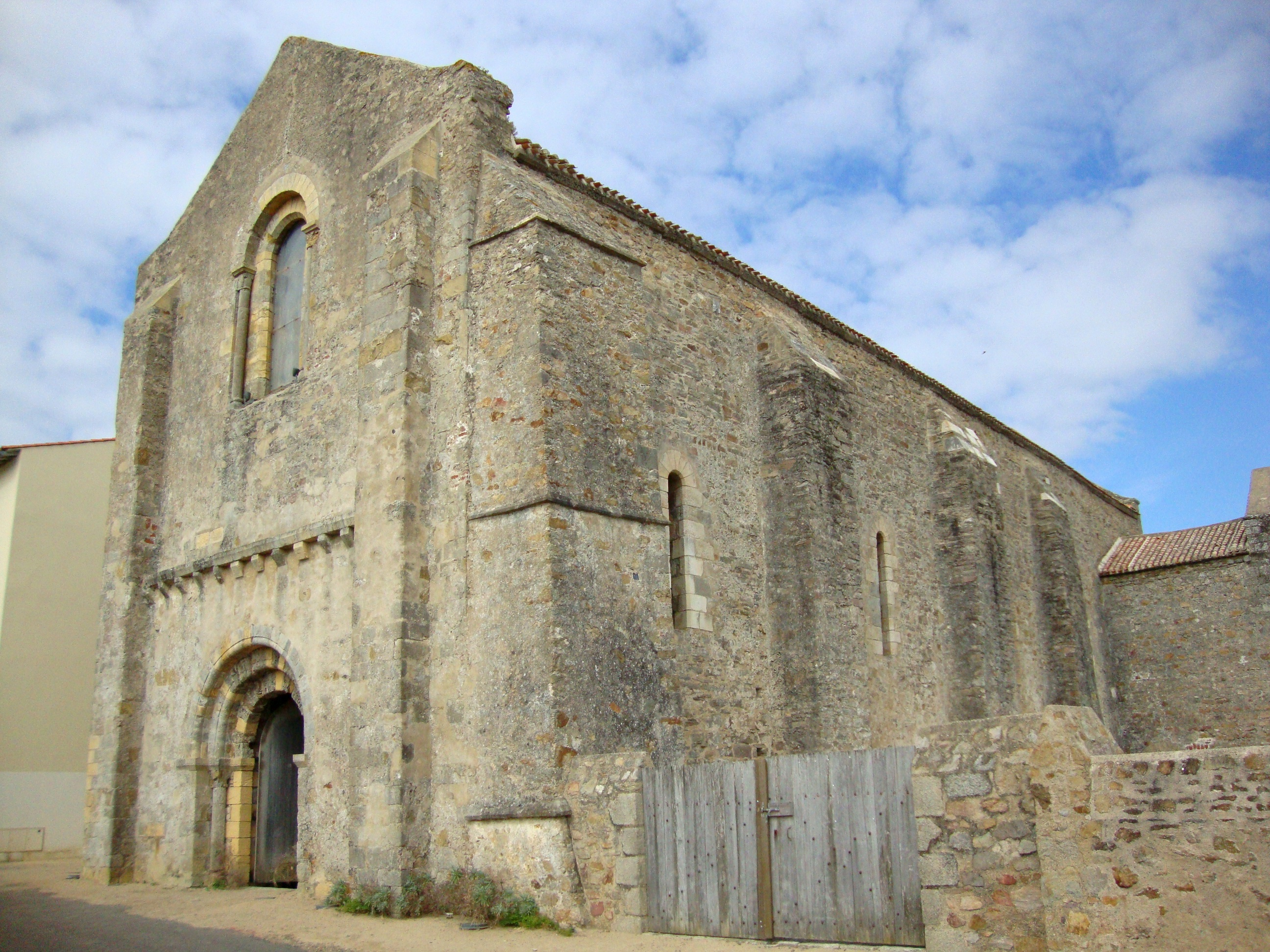
- Saint-Jean Orbestier Abbey
- Location of Château-d'Olonne
- Location within France Location within Pays de la Loire
- Coordinates: 46°30′18″N 1°44′10″W
- Country: France
- Region: Pays de la Loire
- Department: Vendée
- Arrondissement: Les Sables-d'Olonne
- Canton: Les Sables-d'Olonne
- Commune: Les Sables-d'Olonne
- Area^{1}: 31.22 km^{2} (12.05 sq mi)
- Highest elevation: 59 m (194 ft)
- Lowest elevation: 0 m (0 ft)
- Population (2017): 14,411
  - Density: 461.6/km^{2} (1,196/sq mi)
- Time zone: UTC+01:00 (CET)
  - Summer (DST): UTC+02:00 (CEST)
- Postal code: 85180
- ^{1} French Land Register data, which excludes lakes, ponds, glaciers > 1 km^{2} (0.386 sq mi or 247 acres) and river estuaries.

Château-d'Olonne (French pronunciation: [ʃɑto dɔlɔn]) is a former commune of the Vendée department in the Pays de la Loire region of Western France. On 1 January 2019, it was merged into the commune of Les Sables-d'Olonne.
