= Les Sables-d'Olonne =

- Subprefecture and commune
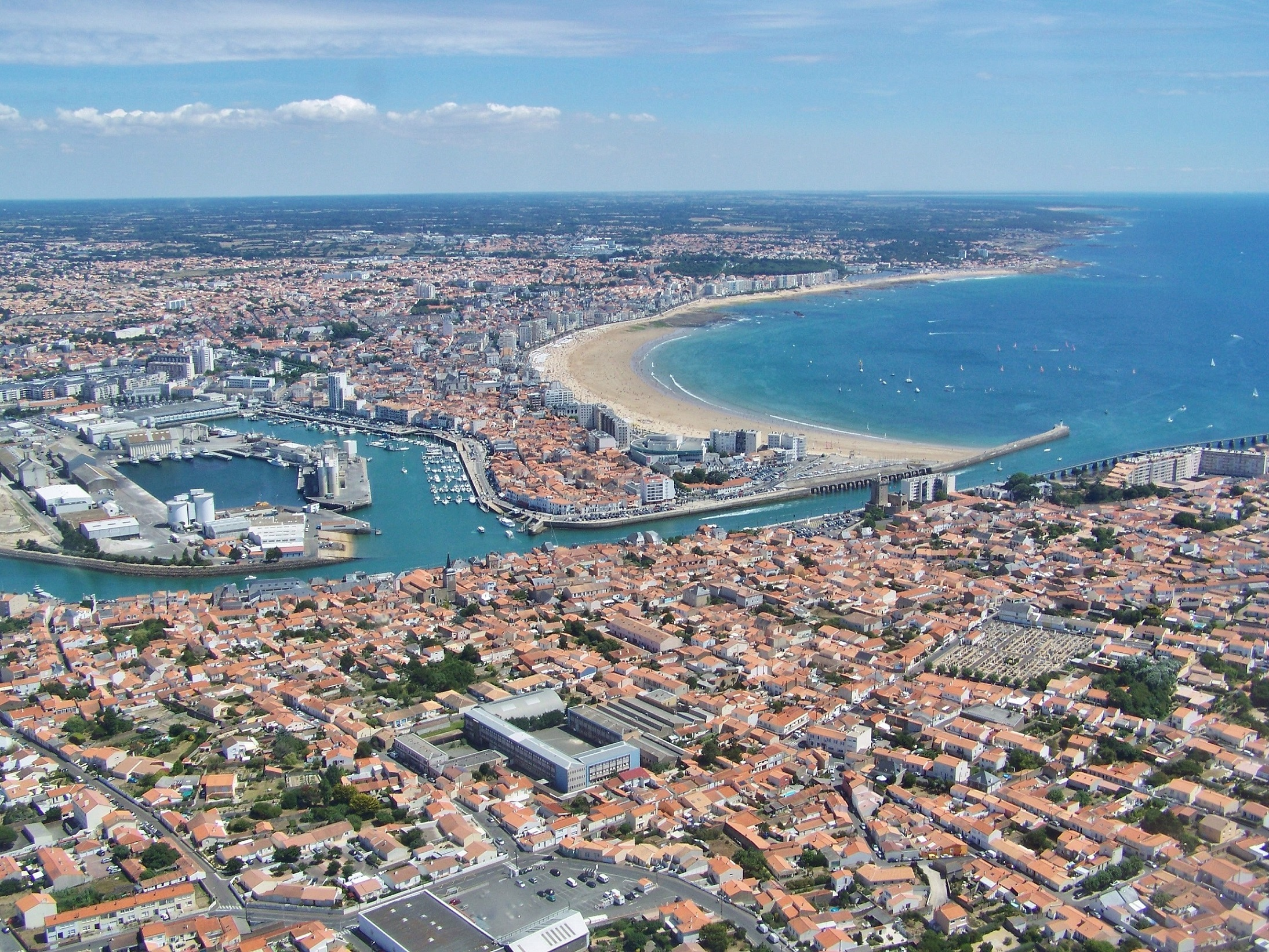
- View of Les Sables-d'Olonne

- Coat of arms
- Motto(s): Advocata nostra, ora pro nobis
- Location of Les Sables-d'Olonne
- Location within France Location within Pays de la Loire
- Coordinates: 46°29′50″N 1°47′00″W
- Country: France
- Region: Pays de la Loire
- Department: Vendée
- Arrondissement: Les Sables-d'Olonne
- Canton: Les Sables-d'Olonne
- Intercommunality: Les Sables d'Olonne Agglomération

Government
  - Mayor (2025–2026): Nicolas Chénéchaud
- Area^{1}: 86.07 km^{2} (33.23 sq mi)
- Highest elevation: 59 m (194 ft)
- Lowest elevation: 0 m (0 ft)
- Population (2023): 49,603
  - Density: 576.3/km^{2} (1,493/sq mi)
- Demonym: Sablais
- Time zone: UTC+01:00 (CET)
  - Summer (DST): UTC+02:00 (CEST)
- INSEE/Postal code: 85194 /85100, 85340, 85180
- Website: ville.lessablesdolonne.fr
- ^{1} French Land Register data, which excludes lakes, ponds, glaciers > 1 km^{2} (0.386 sq mi or 247 acres) and river estuaries.

Les Sables-d'Olonne (French pronunciation: [le sabl dɔlɔn]; Poitevin: Lés Sablles d'Oloune; lit. 'The Sands of Olonne') is a seaside resort and port on the Atlantic coast of Western France, best known as the starting and finishing point of the round the world Vendée Globe yacht race. A subprefecture of the Vendée department, Pays de la Loire, administratively it is a commune, Vendée's second most populated after La Roche-sur-Yon. On 1 January 2019, the communes of Olonne-sur-Mer, Château-d'Olonne and Les Sables-d'Olonne merged, retaining the latter name.

== Location and geography ==
Les Sables-d'Olonne is a town in western France, on the Atlantic Coast. It is situated between La Rochelle and Saint-Nazaire, near the coastal terminus of the A87 that connects it and nearby communities to La Roche-sur-Yon, Cholet, and Angers to the northeast. The nearest major metropolitan area is Nantes, to the north (approximately 105 km, by road). Les Sables-d'Olonne station has rail connections to Paris, La Roche-sur-Yon and Nantes.

It is an administrative division in the French Republic of a commune and is a sub-prefecture of the Department of Vendée.

=== Climate ===
Les Sables-d'Olonne has an oceanic climate (Köppen climate classification Cfb) closely bordering on a warm-summer Mediterranean climate (Csb). The average annual temperature in Les Sables-d'Olonne is 13.2 °C (55.8 °F). The average annual rainfall is 746.7 mm (29.40 in) with November as the wettest month. The temperatures are highest on average in July, at around 19.8 °C (67.6 °F), and lowest in January, at around 7.0 °C (44.6 °F). The highest temperature ever recorded was 40.5 °C (104.9 °F) on 18 July 2022; the coldest temperature ever recorded was −8.3 °C (17.1 °F) on 12 February 2012.

Climate data for Les Sables-d'Olonne (Château-d'Olonne, 1991−2020 normals, extremes 2004−present)
Month	Jan	Feb	Mar	Apr	May	Jun	Jul	Aug	Sep	Oct	Nov	Dec	Year
Record high °C (°F)	15.1 (59.2)	19.8 (67.6)	24.0 (75.2)	26.8 (80.2)	29.7 (85.5)	39.0 (102.2)	40.5 (104.9)	37.5 (99.5)	33.6 (92.5)	27.8 (82.0)	21.1 (70.0)	16.6 (61.9)	40.5 (104.9)
Mean daily maximum °C (°F)	9.6 (49.3)	10.2 (50.4)	12.7 (54.9)	16.0 (60.8)	18.7 (65.7)	22.2 (72.0)	23.8 (74.8)	23.4 (74.1)	22.0 (71.6)	18.1 (64.6)	13.7 (56.7)	10.6 (51.1)	16.8 (62.2)
Daily mean °C (°F)	7.0 (44.6)	7.1 (44.8)	9.2 (48.6)	12.0 (53.6)	14.8 (58.6)	18.2 (64.8)	19.8 (67.6)	19.3 (66.7)	17.6 (63.7)	14.6 (58.3)	10.7 (51.3)	7.8 (46.0)	13.2 (55.8)
Mean daily minimum °C (°F)	4.4 (39.9)	4.1 (39.4)	5.7 (42.3)	8.0 (46.4)	10.9 (51.6)	14.1 (57.4)	15.8 (60.4)	15.3 (59.5)	13.3 (55.9)	11.1 (52.0)	7.8 (46.0)	4.9 (40.8)	9.6 (49.3)
Record low °C (°F)	−7.7 (18.1)	−8.3 (17.1)	−7.3 (18.9)	−0.6 (30.9)	2.1 (35.8)	6.0 (42.8)	9.0 (48.2)	7.6 (45.7)	5.2 (41.4)	0.5 (32.9)	−3.6 (25.5)	−5.4 (22.3)	−8.3 (17.1)
Average precipitation mm (inches)	86.5 (3.41)	62.1 (2.44)	62.0 (2.44)	52.0 (2.05)	48.8 (1.92)	38.4 (1.51)	33.8 (1.33)	46.4 (1.83)	50.8 (2.00)	80.7 (3.18)	100.7 (3.96)	84.5 (3.33)	746.7 (29.40)
Average precipitation days (≥ 1.0 mm)	13.9	11.1	10.7	8.5	7.9	7.1	6.0	7.8	6.4	11.1	13.1	12.8	116.4
Mean monthly sunshine hours	91.8	132.2	178.0	234.4	260.3	275.8	291.2	268.3	227.1	154.3	111.4	99.1	2,323.8
Source: Meteociel

== History ==
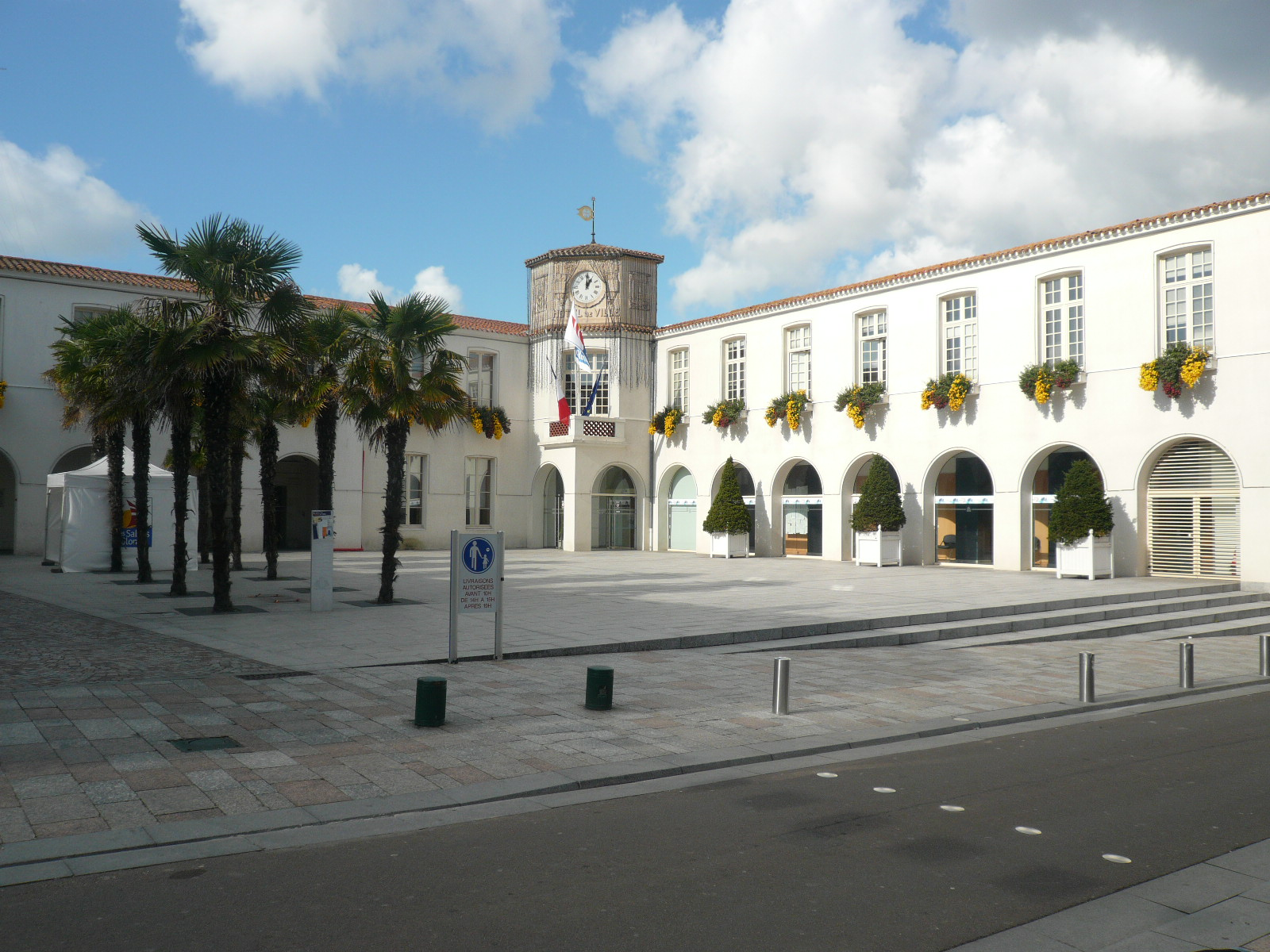
The Hôtel de Ville

Les Sables-d'Olonne (pronounced [le sabl dolɔn]) is French for "the sands of Olonne". It was founded in 1218 from Havre d'Olonne by Savary I de Mauléon, the Lord of Mauléon, Sénéchal of Poitou and prince of Talmont. Its history is tied to the ocean for which it has served as a port and point of maritime commerce. Louis XI separated Les Sables d'Olonne from the town of Olonne in 1472, improved the harbour, and fortified the entrance. It became the largest cod-fishing port in France, with 14,000 inhabitants, in the 17th century. In 1696 Sables was bombarded by the combined fleets of England and the Dutch Republic. During the French Revolution, unlike the surrounding Vendée, the city supported the Republic, and so was often besieged—unsuccessfully, because of its port.

The Hôtel de Ville is a former private house which was acquired in 1803.

The current local tourism industry traces its roots to bathing establishments, first begun in 1825. Rail service reached Les Sables on 29 December 1866, via the line from La Roche-sur-Yon, Bressuire, Saumur, and Tours; express service to and from Paris would arrive in 1971. The city's port served as a base port for American Expeditionary Forces during World War I. Germany occupied Les Sables d'Olonne during World War II and, upon evacuation of that army at war's end, the German army made an effort to destroy the port, and mined the harbor.

== Population ==
The population data in the table and graph below refer to the commune of Les Sables-d'Olonne proper, in its geography at the given years. The populations of Olonne-sur-Mer and Château-d'Olonne, absorbed in 2019, are not included in population data for 2019 and earlier.

Historical population

Year	Pop.	±% p.a.
1793	5,039	—
1800	5,168	+0.36%
1806	5,723	+1.71%
1821	4,698	−1.31%
1831	4,906	+0.43%
1836	4,778	−0.53%
1841	5,076	+1.22%
1846	6,280	+4.35%
1851	5,983	−0.96%
1856	6,464	+1.56%
1861	6,996	+1.59%
1866	7,352	+1.00%
1872	8,292	+2.03%
1876	9,347	+3.04%
1881	10,420	+2.20%
1886	11,070	+1.22%
1891	11,557	+0.86%
1896	11,826	+0.46%
1901	12,244	+0.70%

Year	Pop.	±% p.a.
1906	12,673	+0.69%
1911	14,005	+2.02%
1921	13,387	−0.45%
1926	13,627	+0.36%
1931	13,660	+0.05%
1936	14,536	+1.25%
1946	17,650	+1.96%
1954	17,761	+0.08%
1962	18,401	+0.44%
1968	18,093	−0.28%
1975	17,463	−0.51%
1982	16,100	−1.15%
1990	15,830	−0.21%
1999	15,532	−0.21%
2007	15,433	−0.08%
2012	14,271	−1.55%
2017	14,545	+0.38%
2023	49,603	+22.69%

Source: EHESS and INSEE (2007-2023)

== Interests and events ==
The Vendée Globe yacht race, which takes place every four years, starts and ends at Les Sables-d'Olonne.

The Vendée Air Show has been held on the beach "La Grande Plage" on three occasions, first in 2017, then in 2019, and most recently in 2022.

The Musée de l'Abbaye Sainte-Croix is a municipal museum situated in a 17th-century building that is devoted to modern and contemporary art, and that has "Musée de France" status. It includes works of Gaston Chaissac (1910–1964) and Victor Brauner (1903–1966).

Zoo des Sables is a zoo in the town, that is home to about 500 animals, and features around 50 species.

Les Sables-d'Olonne is the setting for 1948 novel Les Vacances de Maigret, by Georges Simenon.

The town is the birthplace of pirate François l'Olonnais.

== Transport ==
The nearest airports are La Rochelle–Île de Ré Airport, located 58 km (36 mi) south east and Nantes Airport, located 119 km (74 mi) north east of Les Sables-d'Olonne.

== Twin towns – sister cities ==
Les Sables-d'Olonne is twinned with:

- Niceville, Florida, United States
- Gourcy, Burkina Faso
- A Laracha, Spain
- Murat, France
- Schwabach, Germany
- Worthing, England, United Kingdom

== Gallery ==
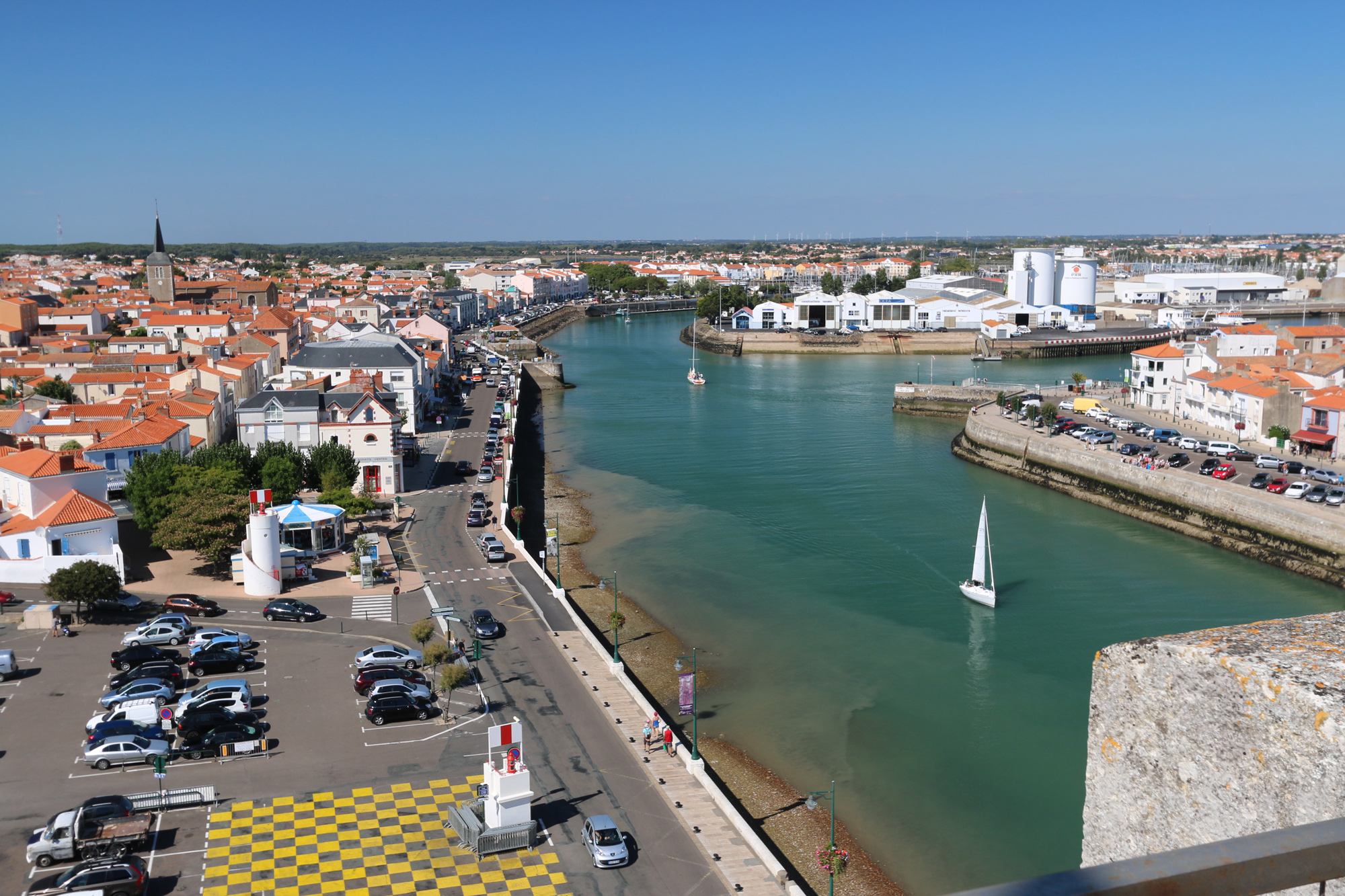
The channel, view from the tower St-Clair

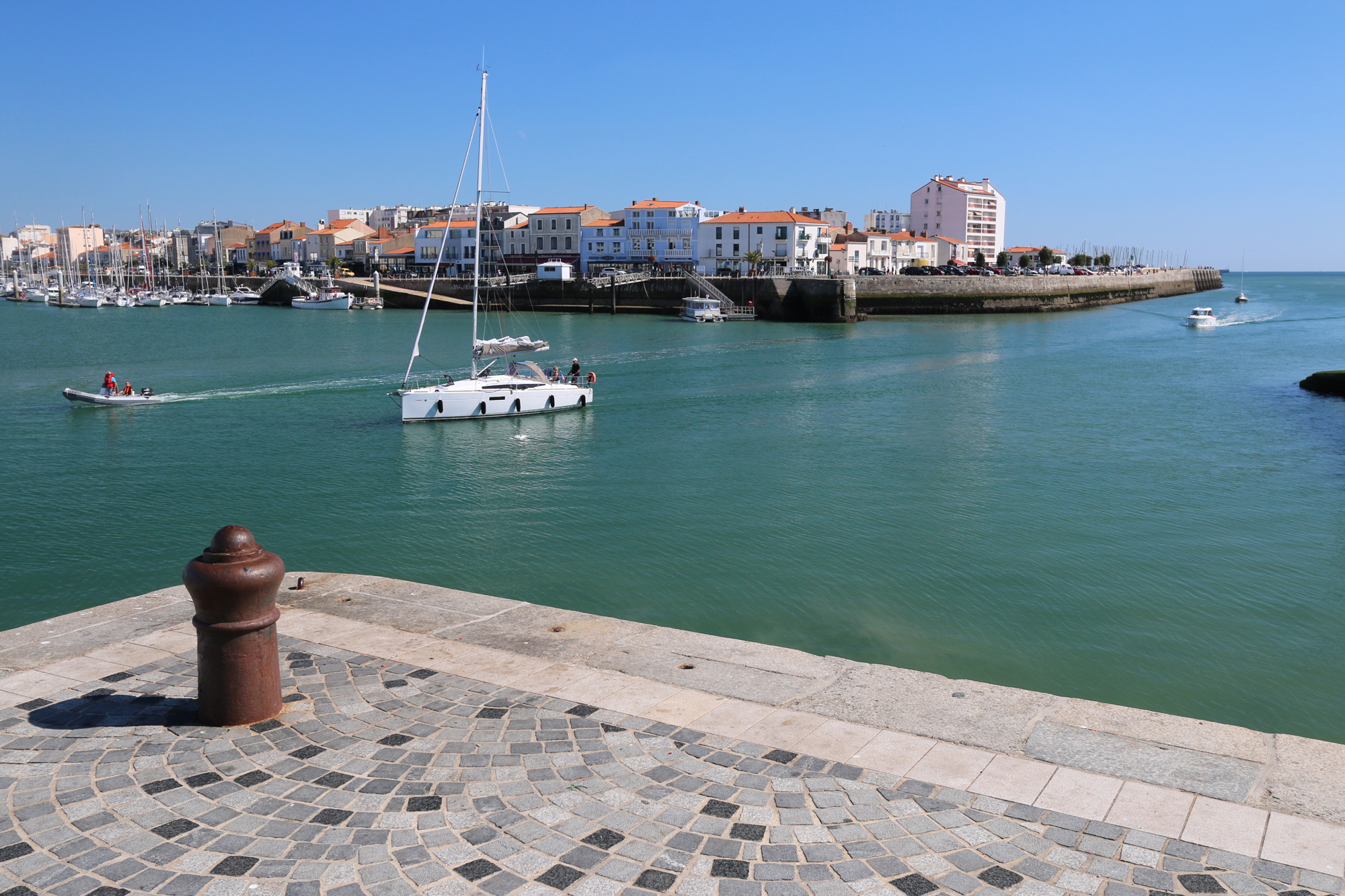
The channel, from the west dock

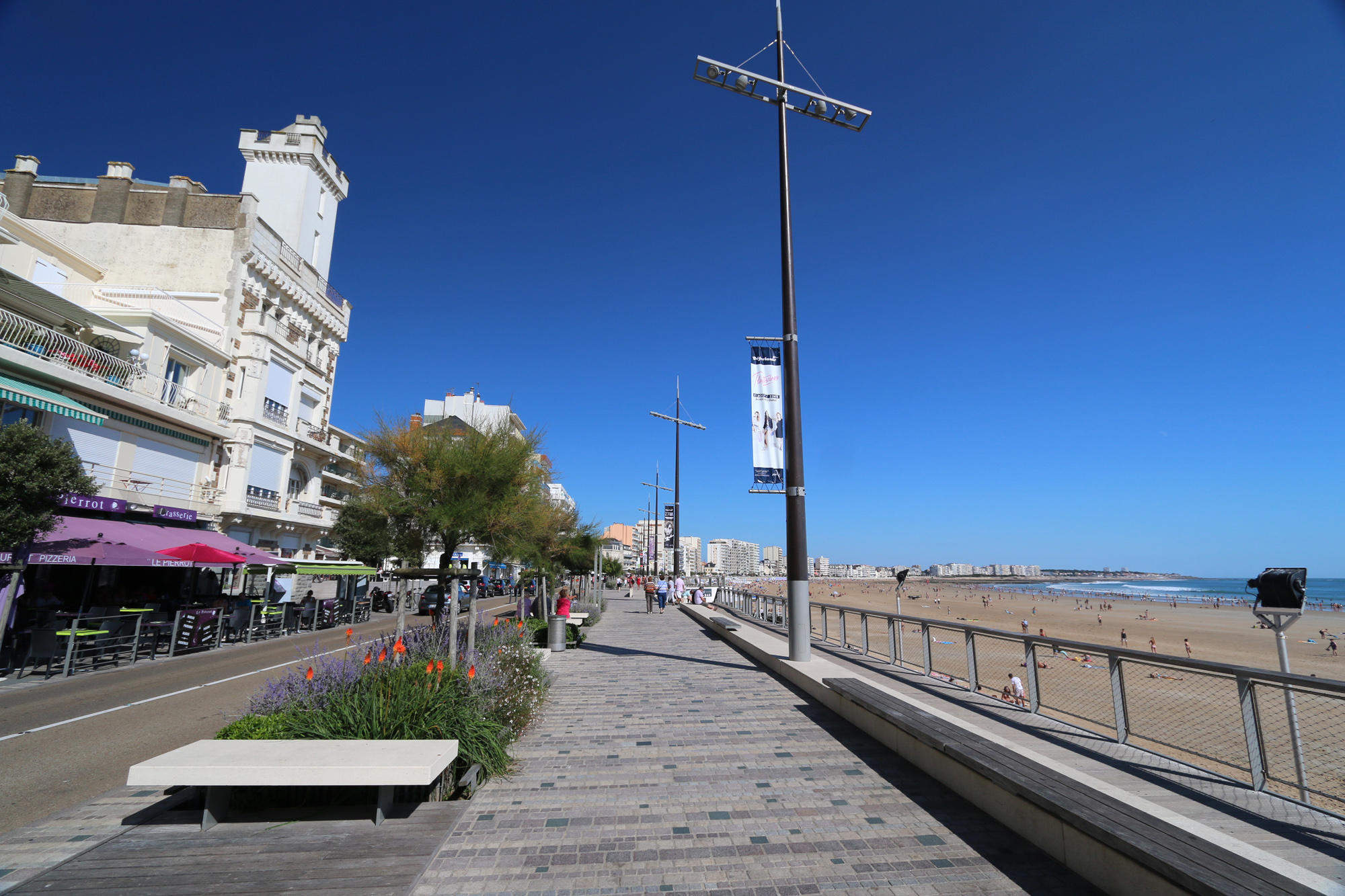
Promenade de l'Amiral Lafargue

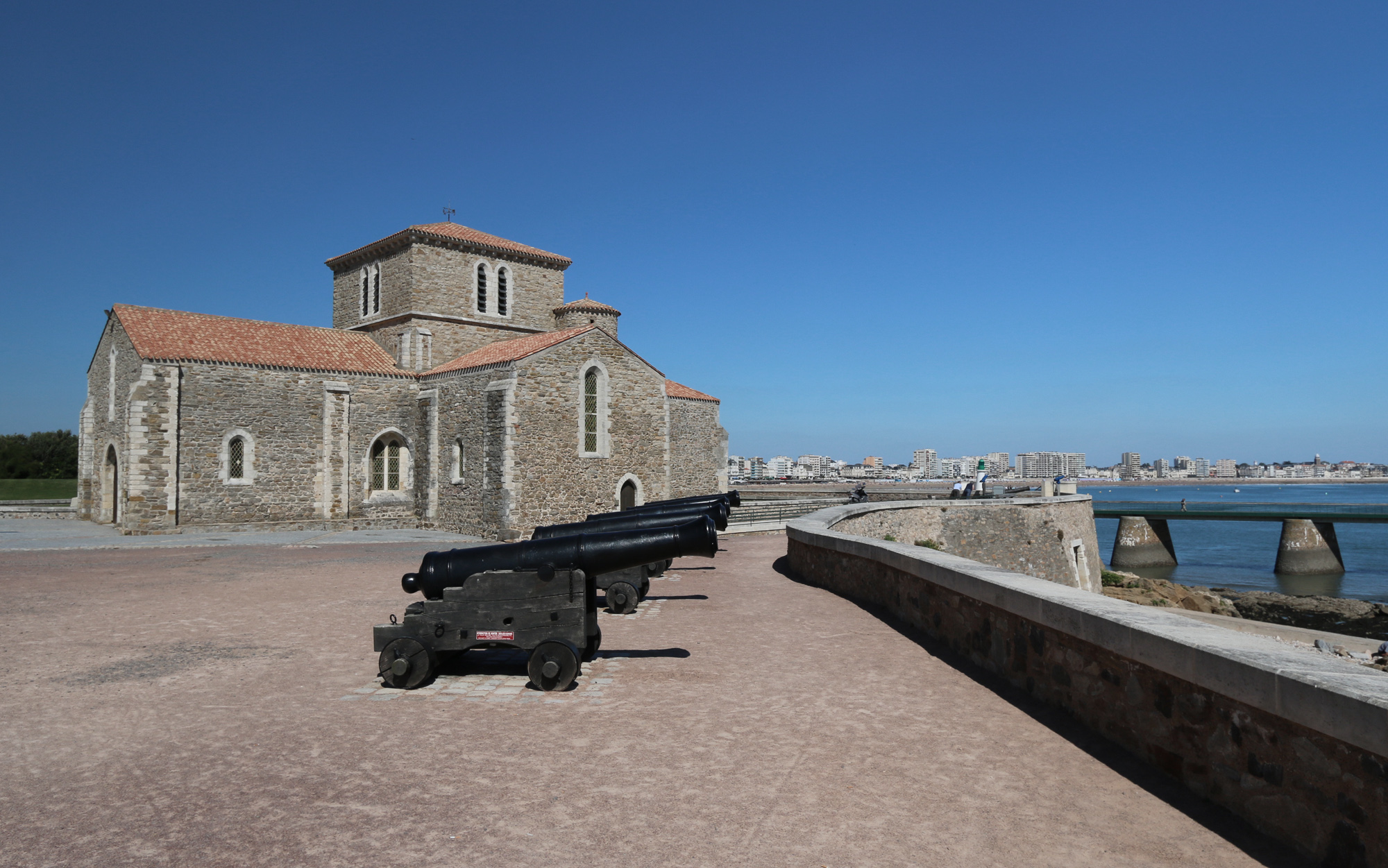
The priory St-Nicolas

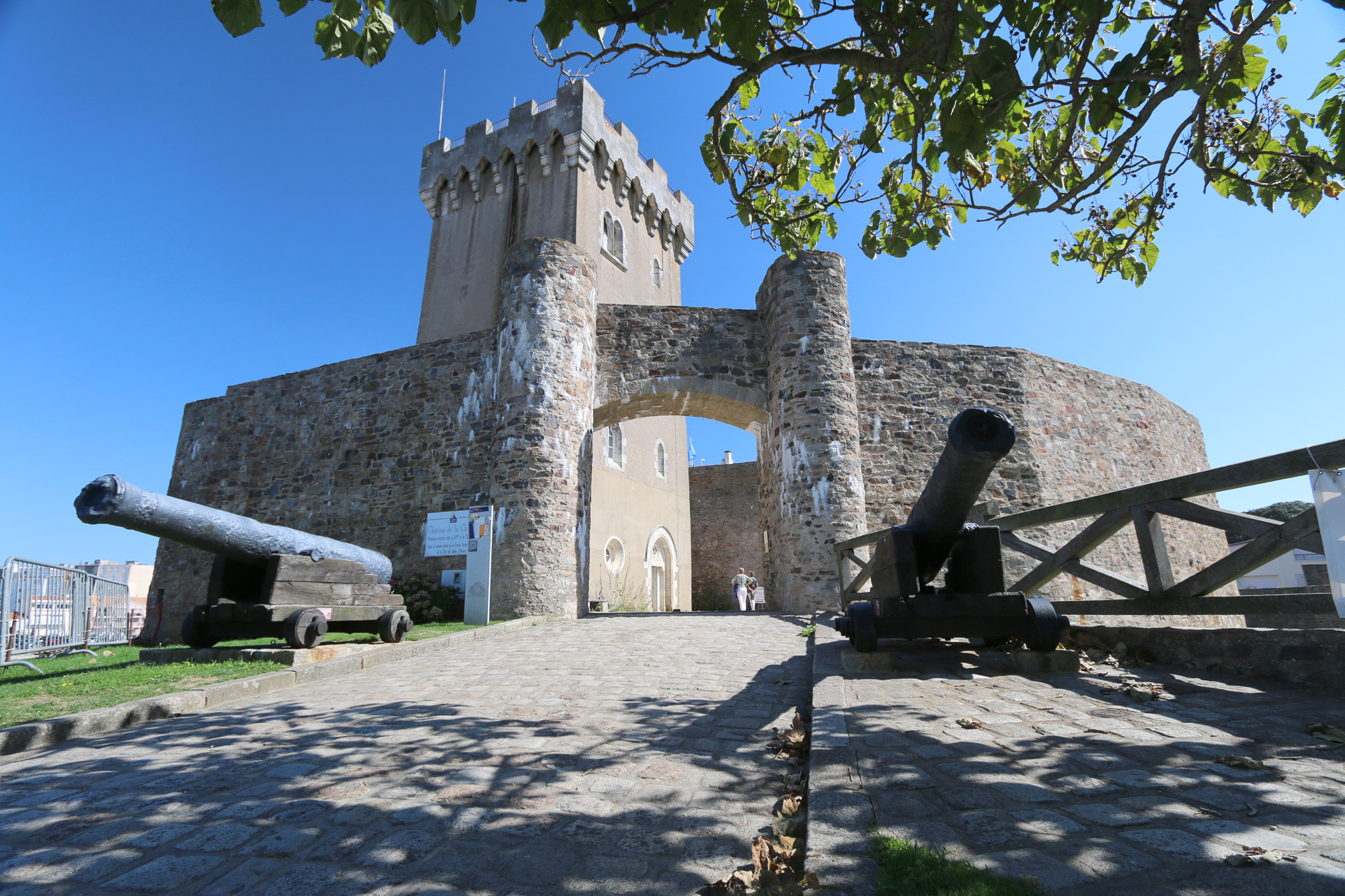
The tower St-Clair

== Notable people ==
- François l'Olonnais (1630–1669), pirate.
- Marie-Rose Tessier (1910–2026), supercentenarian, the oldest living person in France, and the second oldest living person at the time of her death.

== See also ==
- Communes of the Vendée department
