= Aprili =

Aprili may refer to:

- Corrado Aprili, Italian former tennis player
- April (1961 film), a Georgian-language romance-drama film

== See also ==
- Aprilis, the second month of the ancient Roman calendar
- April (disambiguation)
- Aprilia (disambiguation)
