= Avril =

Avril means April in French and other languages. It may also refer to:

== Places ==
- Mont Avril, a mountain on the Swiss-Italian border
- Avril, Meurthe-et-Moselle, a commune of the Meurthe-et-Moselle département, France

== People ==
- Avril (name)
- Avril (singer) (born 1986), Kenyan singer and actress
- Avril (French musician) (born 1974), Frédéric Magnon
- Avril Lavigne (born 1984), Canadian pop-punk singer and songwriter
- Avril, Édouard-Henri (1849–1928), French painter

== Music ==
- Avril, a 2001 album by Laurent Voulzy
- "Avril 14th", a 2001 song by Aphex Twin
- 'Avril', an outtake from album Mouth Moods

== Other uses ==
- April in Love (French: Avril, lit. 'April'), 2006 French drama film, directed by Gerald Hustache-Mathieu
- Avril Group, an international French agro-industrial group
- Talgo AVRIL, a high-speed train being developed by Talgo

== See also ==
- Avril-sur-Loire, a commune of the Nièvre département, France
- April (disambiguation)
