= Zoo des Sables =

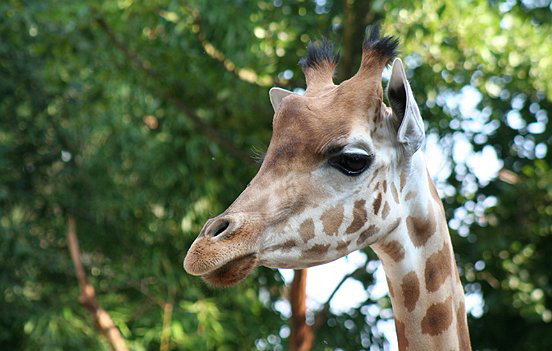
- Giraffe at the Zoo des Sables
- Interactive map of Zoo des Sables
- 46°29′3.1524″N 1°45′20.3508″W
- Date opened: 1963
- Location: Les Sables-d'Olonne, France
- Land area: 3 hectares
- No. of animals: 500
- No. of species: 50
- Annual visitors: 154,000
- Memberships: The French Association of Zoological Parks (AFdPZ) and the European Association of Zoos and Aquaria EAZA
- Website: www.zoodessables.fr

Zoo des Sables is a zoological park in the commune of Les Sables-d'Olonne.

The park covers an area of 3 hectares (7.4 acres). It is home to about 500 animals, and features around 50 species.

The Park is open from February to December. It receives approximately 154,000 visitors per year.

== History ==
The Park was opened in 1963 by the Reverho family, brothers André and Gustave, and Gustave's wife Madelaine, former circus and music hall stars of the 1930s and post war period. They started by getting permission from the municipality to build the zoo on land used as landfill.

In 1969 Gustave Reverho died. In 1975 Madeleine and her brother-in-law André handed the zoo over to Louis Gay, owner of the Zoo de Doué.

== Membership ==
The park is one of the members of The French Association of Zoological Parks (AFdPZ) and the European Association of Zoos and Aquaria EAZA.
