= Cheshire Kat Productions =

American film production company

Cheshire Kat Productions is a commercial film production company founded by actress Michelle Rodriguez and her long-time friend and business partner, Giancarlo Chersich. The company produced the film Stuntwomen: The Untold Hollywood Story (2019). Directed by April Wright, it won the award for Best Documentary By or About Women conferred by the Women Film Critics Circle for 2020.
