= The Gleaners and I =

2000 French documentary by Agnès Varda

- Directed by: Agnès Varda
- Starring: Bodan Litnanski; François Wertheimer
- Release date: July 7, 2000 (France)
- Running time: 82 minutes
- Country: France
- Languages: French; English

The Gleaners and I (French: Les glaneurs et la glaneuse) is a 2000 French documentary film directed by Agnès Varda that explores the subject of gleaning—historically, the gathering of farm produce left after formal harvest, here including rural-urban reclamation of disposed food and objects. The Gleaners and I was an "Official Selection" of the 2000 Cannes Film Festival, and later went on to win several major film awards.

In a 2014 Sight & Sound poll, film critics voted The Gleaners and I the eighth best documentary film of all time. In 2016, the film appeared at No. 99 on BBC's list of the 100 greatest films of the 21st century. The film was included for the first time in 2022 on the critics' poll of Sight and Sound's list of the greatest films of all time, at number 67. In 2025, it ranked number 88 on The New York Times' list of "The 100 Best Movies of the 21st Century."

In 2002, Varda released a follow-up, The Gleaners and I: Two Years Later (French: Les Glaneurs et la glaneuse... deux ans après), in which she revisited some of the people and themes of this film.

== Plot—the subjects ==
For the film, Varda traveled throughout rural and urban France to document various types of gleaners who, whether due to necessity or for artistic or ethical reasons, gather crops left in the field after the harvest or food and objects that have been thrown out. She also included some of the people on the peripheries of the gleaning culture. There are interviews with, among others, a Michelin 2-star chef who gleans and a wealthy restaurant owner whose ancestors were gleaners; the owners of a few vineyards, among whom are psychoanalyst Jean Laplanche and the great-grandson of physiologist and chronophotographer Étienne-Jules Marey; artists that incorporate recycled materials into their work, including Louis Pons, who explains that junk is a "cluster of possibilities"; lawyers who discuss the French laws regarding gleaning versus abandoned property; and an urban gleaner named Alain, who has a master's degree and teaches French to immigrants. Two of the most notable symbols from the film are the numerous heart-shaped potatoes Varda finds in a field and a clock without hands she finds on the street.

In order to find the subjects, Varda claimed her method was to ask all the people she knew to talk to everyone—"the peasants, the owners, the farmers, the fruit growers—about our film. I said to my assistant, 'Call everybody you know.'" Referring to these subjects, Varda stated that "The more I met them, the more I could see I had nothing to make as a statement. They make the statement; they explain the subject better than anybody."

== Technique ==
Gleaners was Varda's first film to use a digital camera (specifically a Sony TRV900 Mini DV Camcorder.) Varda referred to her filmmaking process as "cinécriture" ("cinema-writing"), saying that the process of encountering subjects, choosing shots and music, editing, and writing narration is "all chance working with me, all this is the film writing that I often talk about." As such, she said the objects she found, such as the heart-shaped potato, were "[strokes] of luck", as were some of the shots. For example, in one scene, Varda forgot to turn off her camera, and as the camera hung at her side, it filmed the shifting ground and the dangling lens cap—footage that Varda chose to present in the finished film (with a jazz music background, as "The Dance of the Lens Cap").

In addition to footage relating to "gleaning", Gleaners also includes more self-referential footage, such as a scene in which Varda films herself combing her newly discovered gray hair, or the several closeups of her aging hands. In one scene, she "catches" numerous trucks on the freeway, first encircling each truck by putting her hand in front of the camera lens and then closing her hand as she drives past, "just to play."

== Production ==
The film was shot between September 1999 and April 2000 in Beauce, Jura, Provence, the Pyrenees, and the suburbs of Paris. In the press kit, Varda wrote that she and her team would travel and shoot for roughly two weeks at a time and immediately proceed to edit while scouting for additional locations. She also traveled alone to get many of her "gleaned" shots and would go to markets between 2 and 4 p.m.

Varda produced the film under Cine-Tamaris, a company she founded in 1954 and that had produced most of her previous films. It was distributed by Zeitgeist Films in New York, a company that has distributed films from such directors as Christopher Nolan and the Brothers Quay.

== Release & reception ==
The Gleaners and I debuted out of competition at the 2000 Cannes Film Festival ("Official Selection 2000"). Later that year, it had its North American premiere at the Toronto International Film Festival. It was acclaimed by critics, achieving a score of 83/100 on Metacritic and a 92% approval rating on Rotten Tomatoes. Peter Rainer dubbed the film "lyrically ramshackle". Edward Guthmann of the San Francisco Chronicle argued that "Varda's subject matter is surprisingly rich, but it's her own energetic, curious nature that gives the film its snap." In the Chicago Tribune, Michael Wilmington wrote: "In its frames, we see [Varda's] empathy, skill, curiosity, wit, poetry and passion for life: everything she has gleaned from a lifetime of love and movies."

In Paris, the film attracted 43,000 movie-goers during "the first nine weeks of its summer release." In some places, it was in theaters for over eight months. Haden Guest, the director of the Harvard Film Archive, hailed the film as "one of Varda's most powerful and popular films." Even Varda, herself, remarked at the film's success, saying: "I've never in my entire career felt that people have loved a film of mine as much as this one.”

In 2025, it was one of the films voted for the "Readers' Choice" edition of The New York Times' list of "The 100 Best Movies of the 21st Century," finishing at number 315.

== Awards and recognition ==
The film won awards around the world, including top honors at the Chicago International Film Festival, Prague One World Film Festival, and European Film Awards, and from the National Society of Film Critics (USA), New York Film Critics Circle, Boston Society of Film Critics, Los Angeles Film Critics Association, French Syndicate of Cinema Critics, and Online Film Critics Society. It was also "declared the best French film of 2000 by the French Union of Film Critics, which broke with tradition by not choosing a dramatic film."

== Cinematic significance ==
Ruby Rich believes that the appeal of The Gleaners and I "is due in considerable part to Agnès Varda’s own presence." Guest argues that the ease with which Varda blends documentary and narrative technique is a key reason her films continue to be so relevant, especially "as we witness a resurgence of documentary and a particularly strong interest in hybridized modes of fiction/nonfiction cinema". Jake Wilson, on the other hand, conjectures that Varda, perhaps not fully realizing it, tapped into the cultural zeitgeist and constructed a film that "embodies a quasi-anarchist ethos" built on a "resistance to consumerism, a suspicion of authority, and a desire to reconnect politics with everyday life."

In making a film about gleaning, Varda recognized that she, too, was a gleaner. "I'm not poor, I have enough to eat," she said, but she pointed to "another kind of gleaning, which is artistic gleaning. You pick ideas, you pick images, you pick emotions from other people, and then you make it into a film." For her gleaning, Varda chose to use a digital video camera, and there are several scenes in which she shows and discusses the camera itself; in so doing, she transforms a film about waste into a reflexive meditation on the art of digital documentary. While Varda did not pioneer the reflexive documentary—that honor goes to Dziga Vertov and his 1929 masterpiece Man with a Movie Camera—her work had long been notable for its "reflexive and first-person tendencies."

Also notable is the fact that a filmmaker of Varda's stature chose to abandon high-end film equipment for low-end digital video. As she noted in an interview with Melissa Anderson for Cinéaste, "I had the feeling that this is the camera that would bring me back to the early short films I made in 1957 and 1958. I felt free at that time. With the new digital camera, I felt I could film myself, get involved as a filmmaker.” Yet, for Varda, “the first-person, artisan film-making encouraged by digital video [was] nothing new.” While she acknowledged video's convenience, she downplayed any larger significance: "What's missing in all this talk of digital technologies is the understanding that [...] they're not ends in themselves." Digital cameras and editing equipment were simply tools that enabled her "to collapse the time lapse between wanting to film something and actually being able to do it."

== See also ==
- The Gleaners painting by Jean-François Millet completed in 1857.
- The Gleaners, a 2019 studio album by American jazz bassist Larry Grenadier, inspired by the film.

== Notes ==
- Ebert, Roger. "The Gleaners and I." rogerebert.com. rogerebert.com, 11 May 2001. Web. 20 Nov 2010.
- "The Gleaners and I." IMDbPro. Amazon.com, Inc, n.d. Web. 6 Nov 2010.
- "Official Selection 2000." Festival de Cannes. Festival de Cannes, n.d. Web. 20 Nov 2010.
- "Press Kit." ZeitgeistFilms.com. Zeitgeist Films. n. d. Web. 12 Nov 2010.
- Wilson, Jake. "Trash And Treasure: The Gleaners And I." Senses of Cinema 23 (2002): n. pag. Web. 12 Nov 2010.
