= Hôtel de Ville, Les Sables-d'Olonne =

Town hall in Les Sables-d'Olonne, France

Hôtel de Ville
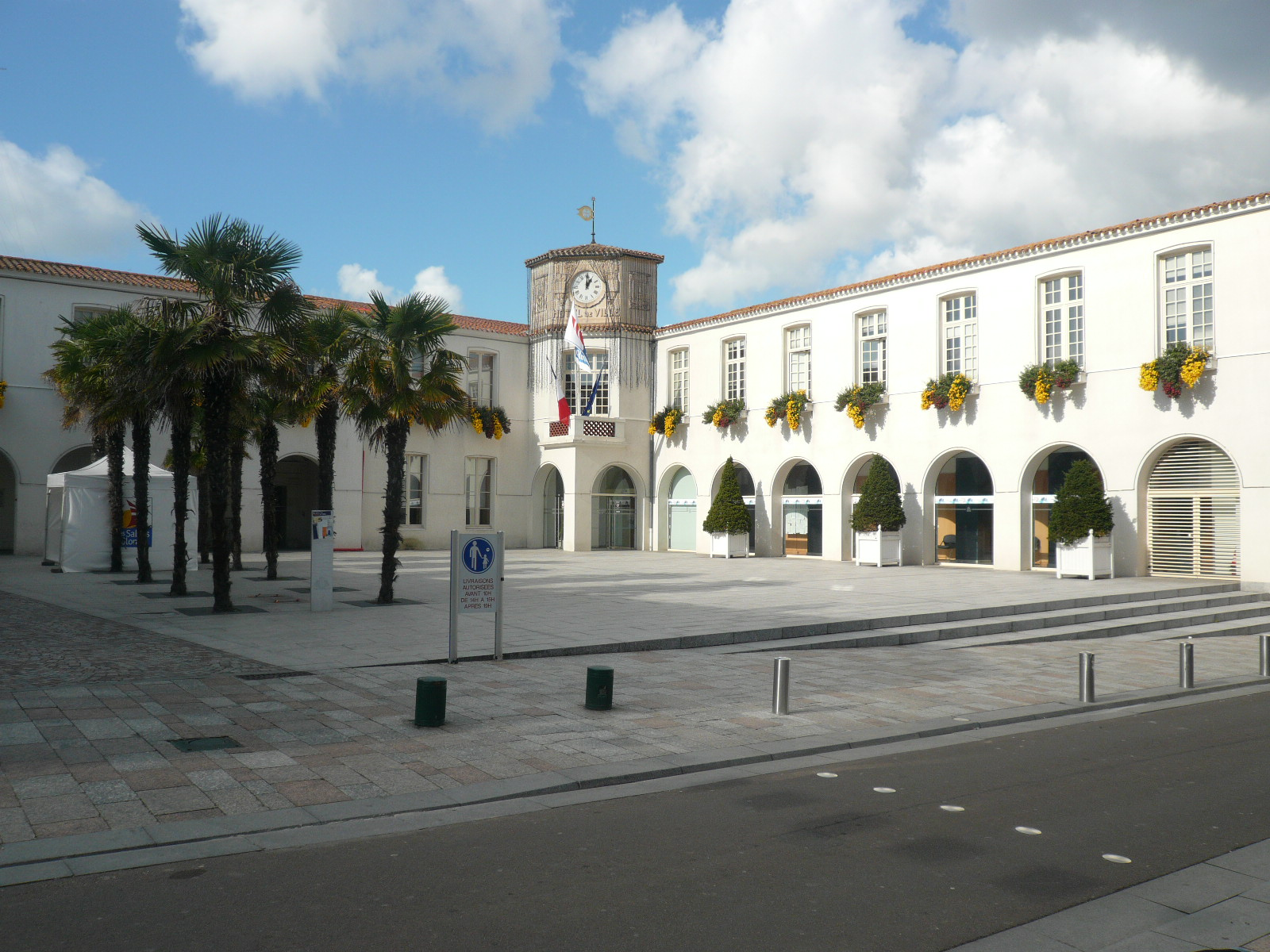
- The main frontage of the Hôtel de Ville in October 2008
- Interactive map of the Hôtel de Ville area

General information
- Type: City hall
- Architectural style: Mediterranean style
- Location: Les Sables-d'Olonne, France
- Coordinates: 46.4968°N 1.7846°W
- Completed: c.1715

The Hôtel de Ville (French pronunciation: [otɛl də vil], City Hall) is a municipal building in Les Sables-d'Olonne, Vendée, in western France, standing on Rue de l'Hôtel de Ville.

== History ==
In the18th century, meetings of the town council took place in the house of one of aldermen serving at the time. This arrangement continued until the French Revolution. In 1790, the council decided to rent a room in the convent of Notre Dame de Bourgenay (now the College of Notre Dame de Bourgenay). They briefly relocated to Maison Tortereau (now occupied by Place du Palais de Justice), and then moved to the Maison Vaugiraud on the quayside in 1793. This had been the home of Vice-Admiral Pierre René Marie de Vaugiraud de Rosnay before he retired to England.

However, in the early 19th century, the council led by the mayor, Simon François Xavier Ferry, decided to acquire a more substantial building for use as a town hall. The site they selected, in heart of the old town, had been the home of the Gaudin family and dated back at least to 1715. The design involved a narrow main frontage of three bays facing onto what is now Rue de l'Hôtel de Ville. There was a doorway in the right-hand bay. The council completed the purchase of the building from Marie Anne Gaudin for FFr 6,600 in October 1803. After the council purchased an adjacent building, Maison Viaud, in 1831, they consolidated the site, with the original building forming the west wing and the new building forming a north wing around a courtyard. The courtyard was further enhanced with an iron gateway created to a design by the municipal engineer, Gustave Loizeau, and installed on the south side of the courtyard in 1863.

In 1950, the two wings were remodelled in the Mediterranean style to a design by local architects, Maurice Durand and Henri Bertrand. The works included improvements to the clock tower at the corner of the two wings including carvings at the top of the tower depicting the coats of arms of both the town and of the department. The building was officially reopened on 6 August 1950. Internally, the principal room was the Salle du Conseil (council chamber) which was refurbished to a design by Michel François in 1964. A weather vane, coated in gold leaf, was presented by the town of Schwabach in Germany and installed at the top of the tower in 1975.

In the early 1990s, the council decided to expand the complex further with the addition of a new administrative building. The site they selected, on the north side of Rue de la Caisse d’Epargne, had been occupied by a car repair garage. The new building was designed in the modern style by architects Jolly, Barré and Lambot. It featured a curved frontage facing onto Place du Poilu de France and was accessed from the original town hall by way of a glass footbridge across Rue de la Caisse d’Epargne. The new building was officially opened on 9 January 1995.

Two bronze cannons recovered the French merchant ship La Placellière, which sank in the bay in 1747, were exhibited in front of the town hall during the first two decades of the 21st century.
