= Louis Pons =

French artist (1927–2021)

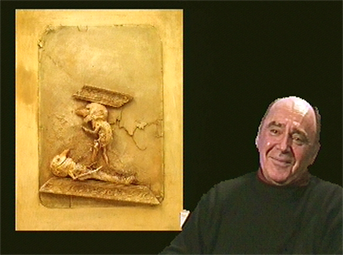
Pons in 1995

Louis Pons (30 April 1927 – 12 January 2021) was a French collage artist. He specialised in reliefs and assemblages made entirely from discarded objects and junk. In Agnès Varda's documentary The Gleaners and I, Pons explains his artistic process and understanding of art; what others see as "a cluster of junk," he sees as "a cluster of possibilities;" and that the function of art is to tidy up one's inner and exterior worlds.

Pons was born on 30 April 1927. He died on 12 January 2021, at the age of 93.
