= April A. Benasich =

American neuroscientist

- Education: New York University (PhD)
- Scientific career
- Fields: Neuroscience
- Workplaces: Rutgers University
- Doctoral advisor: Marc Bornstein

April A. Benasich is an American neuroscientist. She is the Elizabeth H. Solomon Professor of Developmental Cognitive Neuroscience, director of the Infancy Studies Laboratory at the Center for Molecular and Behavioral Neuroscience, and director of the Carter Center for Neurocognitive Research and Professor of Neuroscience at Rutgers University. She is also a principal investigator within the National Science Foundation-funded Temporal Dynamics of Learning Center headquartered at the University of California, San Diego’s Institute for Neural Computation.

Benasich was the first to link early deficits in rapid auditory processing to later impairments in language and cognition, thus demonstrating that the ability to perform fine non-speech acoustic discriminations in early infancy is critically important to, and highly predictive of, language development in typically developing children as well as children at risk for language learning disorders. Her research also suggests that rapid auditory processing ability may be used to identify and remediate infants at highest risk of language delay and impairment regardless of risk status. and she has demonstrated that infants who played a training game developed to encourage them to focus on small aural differences developed more accurate acoustic maps than infants who were not exposed to the same intervention.

== Education ==
Benasich received Ph.D.s from New York University in experimental/cognitive neuroscience and clinical psychology in 1987 and has a bachelor's of science degree in nursing and extensive medical experience in pediatrics. She completed her initial postdoctoral work at Johns Hopkins University School of Medicine, where she was a member of the Research Steering Committee of the Infant Health and Development Program funded by the Robert Wood Johnson Foundation, and a second postdoctoral fellowship under Paula Tallal at the Center for Molecular and Behavioral Neuroscience.

== Research ==
Benasich's work has centered on the study of the early neural processes necessary for normal cognitive and language development and the impact of disordered processing in high risk or neurologically impaired infants. At New York University, Benasich and Marc Bornstein studied the relationship of infant behaviors such as attention, habituation and memory to later cognitive and linguistic activity. In her postdoctoral work at Johns Hopkins, she served on the Research Steering Committee for the Infant Health and Development Program, a large national randomized clinical trial of an early intervention program for low birth weight, premature infants.

As a research associate at the Center for Molecular and Behavioral Neuroscience, Benasich developed a behavioral and electrocortical battery that permitted the assessment of rapid auditory temporal processing in infancy and its relationship to subsequent language outcomes. The resulting studies demonstrated that differences in infant discrimination of rapid auditory cues (a critical skill for decoding language) were related to differences in later language comprehension and production. At the Infancy Studies Laboratory, Benasich's research, involving more than 1000 children over fifteen years, has continued to focus on neural underpinnings of cognitive and language development as well as the development of temporally-bounded sensory information processing (shown to be a predictor of language impairment and dyslexia in older children). Her research has shown that the ability to perform fine-grained acoustic analyses in the tens of milliseconds time range in early infancy is critical to the decoding of the speech stream and the subsequent establishment of phonemic maps that support later language development. Currently, the Benasich lab is studying the evolution of infant brain waves (and oscillations) as infants process the critical timing cues important for the construction of prelinguistic acoustic maps that support language acquisition. Failure to efficiently process these timing cues can produce difficulties as language is set up, particularly in children with a family history of language learning issues. Studies from the Benasich lab suggest that behavioral intervention in young infants can support and enhance language mapping and rapid auditory processing abilities and that those changes endure.

Benasich has co-founded RAPT Ventures, a company whose goals are to facilitate technology transfer from the lab to the real world in order to optimize early brain development during the critical periods for early language. RAPT Ventures further progressed their goal by the creation of the RAPTbaby Smarter Sleep Sound Machine, designed to produce a soothing sound environment for infants. The creation of this machine is based on the continuation of Benasich's research, which found that exposing infants to passive auditory sounds increased their ability to efficiently process syllables.
