= Avril Henry =

British university teacher and activist

Avril Henry

Avril K. Henry (5 April 1935 – 20 April 2016) was an English professor of medieval culture and activist for the legalisation of euthanasia. She died by suicide in 2016.

== Biography ==
Henry was born in Lincoln, Lincolnshire to Royal Air Force officer Robert Charles Henry and Eileen Florence Whattam Henry.

Henry worked as a professor of English medieval culture at the University of Exeter. She researched the theory of typology.

Henry campaigned for the legalisation of voluntary euthanasia. She died by suicide at her home in Brampford Speke, Devon, near Exeter, on 20 April 2016, aged 81. Her home had been raided by police the previous week after they were tipped off by Interpol that she had bought a euthanasia kit from Mexico.

== Selected publications ==
- Biblia Pauperum. Scolar, Aldershot, 1987; ISBN 9780859675420
- The Mirour of Mans Saluacioune: a Middle English translation of Speculum humanae salvationis: a critical edition of the fifteenth-century manuscript illustrated from Der Spiegel der Meschen Behaltnis, Speyer, Drach, c. 1475; University of Pennsylvania Press, 1987; ISBN 0812280547
- The Eton Roundels: Eton College MS 177 'Figurae Bibliorum' A Colour Facsimile With Transcription, Translation and Commentary; ISBN 978-0859677561
