= April Rose =

April Rose may refer to:

- April Rose Pengilly, Australian actress and former model
- April Rose (politician), American politician
- April Rose Wilkens, American convicted murderer
