= Averill Hill =

Irish Anglican priest (died 1814)

Averill Hill was an Anglican priest in Ireland in the late 18th and early 19th centuries.

Hill was born in Dublin and educated at Trinity College, Dublin. He was Archdeacon of Limerick from 1803 until his death in 1814. He is buried in St. Munchin's Churchyard.
