= Margaux Avril =

French singer

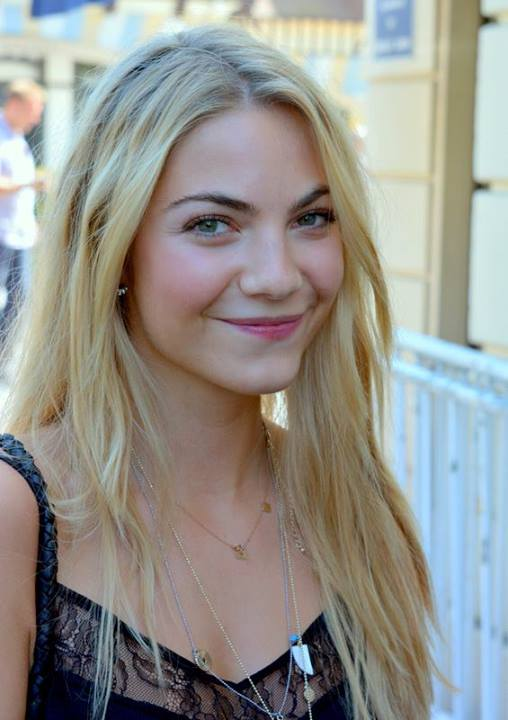
- Margaux Avril Deauville in 2013

Background information
- Born: 8 April 1991 (age 34); Paris, France
- Genres: French Pop
- Occupation: Singer
- Years active: 2013–present
- Labels: AZ

Margaux Avril (born in Paris, France, on 8 April 1991) is a French singer. She is signed to the French AZ label.

She studied piano and photography. After meeting guitarist Tristan Salvati, they collaborated as an artistic duo gaining fame online after releasing online materials. The recording of "L'air de rien" gained notability first on Noomiz online website and was released on AZ label charting both in France and Belgium.

== Discography ==
=== Albums ===
Year	Album	Peak positions	
Year	Album	FRA	BEL (Wa)
2013	Instantanés	74	163

=== Singles ===
Year	Single	Peak positions		Album
Year	Single	FRA	BEL (Wa)	Album
2013	"L'air de rien"	61	30 (Ultratip)	TBA
