= April Bulmer =

Canadian poet

April Bulmer (born 1963) is a Canadian poet whose poems have appeared in numerous literary magazines and anthologies, including Arc, the Malahat Review, Quills, and Ascent Aspirations. Her poetry has won awards from Leaf Press and the Ontario Poetry Society.

Bulmer was born in Toronto and educated at that city's York University, where she earned a Bachelor's degree in English and mass communications. She holds three Master's degrees: in creative writing from Concordia University in Montreal, in theology from Toronto's University of Trinity College and in religious studies from the University of Windsor.

== Publications ==
- 1991: A Salve for Every Sore, Cormorant Books, ISBN 978-0-920953-66-2
- 1997: The Weight of Wings, Trout Lily Press, ISBN 978-0-9681530-3-1
- 1999: HIM, Black Moss Press, ISBN 978-0-88753-322-8
- 2004: Oh My Goddess, Serengeti Press, ISBN 978-0-9732068-4-5
- 2005: Spring Rain, Serengeti Press, ISBN 978-0-9732068-9-0
- 2007: Black Blooms, Serengeti Press, ISBN 978-0-9784474-1-0
- 2008: The Goddess Psalms, Serengeti Press, ISBN 978-0-9784474-3-4
