= April (surname) =

April is a surname. Notable people with the surname include:

== People ==
- Bobby April (born 1953), American National Football League coach
- Bobby April III, American football coach, son of the above
- Brendon April (born 1993), South African rugby union player
- Ernest April (1939–2021), American anatomist who defended the use of Nazi medical drawings in anatomy textbooks
- Heinrich April (born 1980), South African politician
- Raymonde April (born 1953), Canadian contemporary artist, photographer and academic
- Salomon April (born 1966), Namibian politician

== Characters ==
- Robert April, a character in the Star Trek universe

== See also ==
- Abril
- April (given name)
- Avril (name)
- April (disambiguation)
