= Abril Rodríguez =

Mexican beauty contestant (born 1986)

- Born: Abril Alejandra Rodríguez Fernández; November 21, 1986 (age 39); Saltillo, Coahuila, Mexico
- Height: 1.76 m (5 ft 9 1/2 in)
- Beauty pageant titleholder
- Hair color: Black
- Eye color: Brown

Abril Alejandra Rodríguez Fernández (born November 21, 1986) is a Mexican beauty contestant.

Abril Fernández competed against thirty-four other young women in the 2009 national Nuestra Belleza México pageant. She placed among the Top 10 and received the Personalidad Fraiche award.
