= Averill Peak =

Mountain summit in Saranac, New York

- Location within New York

Highest point
- Elevation: 3,803 ft (1,159 m)
- Prominence: 363 ft (111 m)
- Isolation: 1.09 mi (1.75 km)
- Coordinates: 44°41′34″N 73°52′52″W

Geography
- Location: Saranac; New York, United States
- Parent range: Adirondack Mountains

Averill Peak is a mountain summit located in the town of Saranac, in Clinton County, New York. It is part of the Adirondack Mountains and adjacent to Lyon Mountain.
