= Averell Smith =

American political adviser (born 1958)

- Born: November 18, 1958 (age 68); San Francisco, California
- Occupations: Political Consultant, Public Relations Expert

Averell "Ace" Smith (born November 18, 1958) is an American political adviser who has worked mainly for Democratic Party candidates and initiatives. He has worked on many state and national campaigns, either independently or as part of a consulting firm which he co-founded in 1997.

== Early life and education ==
Named after former New York governor and U.S. ambassador Averell Harriman, Smith was introduced to the political world at a young age, working on his father Arlo Smith’s campaign for District Attorney of San Francisco. He campaigned for George McGovern for president in 1972 at age 13. His first job was at a legal processor on Taylor and Market Streets in San Francisco, before working as a consultant for the Democratic Congressional Campaign Committee in the 1980s.

== Career ==
Beginning in 1988, Smith began to focus his political work on opposition research, including work for Mayor Richard M. Daley of Chicago and Mayor Richard Riordan of Los Angeles. He used the same methods to identify potential vulnerabilities of his own clients, for example in Bill Clinton’s 1992 campaign. He unearthed a minor billing scandal in the Department of Water and Power involving incumbent Mayor James Hahn that helped his client Antonio Villaraigosa win the election. and provided members of the press with the roster of the Canadian football team the Hamilton Tiger-Cats after it was reported that Los Angeles City Attorney Rocky Delgadillo had falsely claimed to play for them, when Delgadillo was running against Smith's client Jerry Brown in the 2006 Democratic primary.

Campaigns he has worked on include those of Doug Wilder (1989), Senator Patty Murray (1992), Senator Dianne Feinstein (1992), Senator Kent Conrad (1993), Congressman Richard Gephardt (1994-2002), California Governor Gray Davis (1998, 2002), Senator Barbara Boxer (1992-2010) and Howard Dean for President (2004). In 2008, Smith led Senator Hillary Clinton's 9-point victory in California's Democratic primary by identifying key demographic groups like Latino voters and working women and concentrating his efforts on mail-in and other early voters. He oversaw the campaign in Texas, achieving a second surprising victory.

Smith directed Antonio Villaraigosa’s winning underdog Los Angeles Mayoral campaign in 2005 and Jerry Brown’s winning campaign for CA Attorney General 2006. He was State Director for Senator Hillary Clinton’s campaigns in CA, TX and NC in the 2008 Democratic Presidential Primary. In 2010 he was instrumental in San Francisco District Attorney Kamala Harris’s winning bid for California Attorney General and San Francisco Mayor Gavin Newsom’s successful campaign for California Lt. Governor. He ran Ed Lee’s mayoral reelection campaign. After successfully contributing to the passing of Governor Jerry Brown's landmark tax legislation Proposition 30 in 2012, Smith was hired by Lenore Anderson, executive director of Californians for Safety and Justice and chair of the Proposition 47 campaign, and that measure succeeded at the polls as well.

== Activism ==
Smith and his wife Laura Talmus started Beyond Differences, a non-profit based in San Rafael, California to honor their daughter Lili Smith, who died in 2009 from complications due to Apert syndrome, a rare genetic disorder that causes facial and cranial disfiguration and which consequently caused her to suffer from feelings of social isolation. The organization endeavors to combat social isolation in young teens, by encouraging students to be aware of the possible social isolation of their peers, and to interact with them and draw them into their social circles.
