= Étienne Avril =

French furniture designer

- Born: 1748
- Died: 24 June 1791 (aged 42–43)
- Occupation: Furniture designer

Étienne Avril (1748-1791) was a French furniture designer, or ébéniste.

== Early life ==
Étienne Avril was born in 1748. He had two brothers, both of whom also became ébénistes.

== Career ==
As an ébéniste, Avril mostly designed rectangular mahogany panels, framed by bronze. He became a maître-ébéniste, or master furniture designer, in 1774. A year later, in 1775, he began adding porcelain to the design of his furniture. For example, he added two nymphs made of bisque to a wardrobe he designed for the Palace of Fontainebleau. Other notable pieces of furniture include a marquetry desk with a glass door for the Mirault family, and a mahogany guéridons with leg made of gilded bronze for the Sené family.

== Personal life and death ==
Avril resided on the rue de Charenton in the Faubourg Saint-Antoine of Paris. He died on 24 June 1791.
