= April Smith =

April Smith may refer to:

- April Smith (folk-rock singer), leader of the American folk-rock indie group April Smith and the Great Picture Show
- April Smith (writer), American mystery writer and television producer
- April Smith, winner of the 1989 Miss Missouri Teen USA pageant
- April Smith, a character in School for Scoundrels
