= April Summers =

English glamour model

- Born: Nadia Foster; 12 May 1988 (age 38); London, England
- Occupation: Glamour model
- Years active: 2007–present
- Modelling information
- Height: 5 ft 6 in (1.68 m)
- Hair colour: Blonde
- Eye colour: Blue
- Agency: CXLondon
- Website: aprilsummersexclusive.com

Nadia Foster (born 12 May 1988) commonly known as April Summers, is an English glamour model. She was the Playboy Playmate centrefold for the French golden edition December 2011 Playmate of the Month and has (as of 2017) featured on 30 other covers of Playboy editions, including Brazil, Spain, and the US. Summers is also an official Girl of Maxim USA. April appears regularly in the newspapers and covers of magazines in Italy and South America for being known as the mascot to Italian football team Inter Milan. She also rose to popularity in Argentina due to her admiration for the football player Mauro Icardi.

== Career ==
Summers began modelling in 2007 with CXLondon, a fashion company in the UK. Since then, she has appeared in numerous publications. The work of the English model can be found in many notable magazines such as GQ, GQ Mexico and FHM. Besides the UK, the model made her US debut in 2012, when she was featured in an issue of Maxim. April Summers rose to prominence when she first appeared as a Playboy Playmate for Playboy France's gold issue in September 2010, where she posed for a 12-page spread. Ever since, it has been a landslide for the English model, as she went on to appear in Playboy Italy, Playboy Hungary, Playboy Lithuania, Playboy Poland, Playboy Spain, Playboy North Macedonia, Playboy Argentina, Playboy Slovenia, Playboy Thailand, Playboy Slovakia, and Playboy Mexico. However, her international success does not stop there, the model is constantly being published in top Italian magazines ever since she rose to fame in Italy by announcing that she is a fan of the world known team Inter Milan. April was interviewed by Playboy in October 2010 for their website "The Smoking Jacket". and is the face of The Golden Handcuff Co. In November 2011, she released her first official calendar.

The model has over 3.5 million followers on her official Facebook page.

== Personal life ==
Summers was born Nadia Foster on 12 May 1988 in London, England.

She is a supporter of Football Club Internazionale Milano.
