= April Dunn =

American disability rights activist (1986–2020)

- Born: July 6, 1986
- Died: March 28, 2020 (aged 33); Baton Rouge, Louisiana, U.S.
- Citizenship: American
- Occupation: Disability rights activist

April Dunn (July 6, 1986 – March 28, 2020) was an American disability rights activist. Dunn lived in Louisiana and worked as chair of the Louisiana Developmental Disabilities Council (LDDC) and for the governor's office. Dunn was best known for helping to advocate for the passage of Act 833 which provides an alternative to graduation for students who are unable to pass standardized tests in the state.

== Early life ==
Dunn was born on July 6, 1986, and was put up for adoption by her biological mother. At the age of five months, she was adopted by a teacher, Joannette Dunn, and lived with both her mother and her grandmother in Covington, Louisiana and Baton Rouge growing up. Dunn was born with both fetal alcohol syndrome and cerebral palsy. As a child, she often had upper respiratory infections and pneumonia. She attended Glen Oaks High School, but was unable to receive a diploma at graduation because she was unable to pass the standardized tests in the state.

== Work ==
Dunn became involved in advocating for Act 833 in the Louisiana State Legislature. The act passed in 2014 and "establishes alternative pathways for grade promotion and graduation for students who have not passed standardized tests." Dunn testified in front of committees and met with lawmakers about her own experiences not receiving a diploma. She was present when Governor Bobby Jindal signed the bill into law.

Dunn went on to become the vice-chair of the Louisiana Developmental Disabilities Council (LDDC) and after showing her leadership skills at a quarterly meeting, became the chair. In 2018, as chair, she criticized the lack of visibility and poor access to information about Act 833, saying that "information on the department's website was difficult to access".

In 2017, she became a staffer on the governor's office of disability affairs and rose to the position of senior coordinator. She monitored legislation and did outreach, including recording a video with Governor John Bel Edwards to encourage businesses to hire more people with disabilities. Dunn was also included in the State as a Model Employer Taskforce.

== Death ==
Dunn was working on March 10, 2020, attending meetings throughout Louisiana. She and her co-workers all tested positive for COVID-19 after these meetings. She was soon hospitalized for complications from the virus and her mother was not allowed to visit. On March 28, 2020, Dunn died at a hospital in Baton Rouge, Louisiana.
