= April Carson =

American epidemiologist

- Education: University of Georgia; UNC Gillings School of Global Public Health
- Scientific career
- Fields: Cardiovascular epidemiologist
- Workplaces: University of Alabama at Birmingham
- Doctoral advisor: Gerardo Heiss

April Perry Carson is an American epidemiologist. She is an associate professor of epidemiology and associate dean for diversity, equity, and inclusion at the University of Alabama at Birmingham School of Public Health. Carson is director of the Jackson Heart Study.

== Education ==
Carson completed a B.S. in microbiology at University of Georgia. She earned a M.S.P.H. and Ph.D. in epidemiology at the UNC Gillings School of Global Public Health. Carson was a postdoctoral researcher in cardiovascular disease epidemiology at UNC. Her 2005 dissertation was titled Individual and neighborhood socioeconomic status across the life course and subclinical atherosclerosis. Carson's doctoral advisor was Gerardo Heiss.

== Career ==
Carson was an associate professor of epidemiology and associate dean for diversity, equity, and inclusion at the University of Alabama at Birmingham (UAB) School of Public Health. On September 20, 2021, she succeeded Adolfo Correa as director of the Jackson Heart Study (JHS). JHS is the United States' largest and longest-running longitudinal study of cardiovascular health in African Americans.

Carson has a history of studying the disproportionate effects of disease in African Americans. As an epidemiologist at UAB, she has worked to identify and address the root causes of disparities associated with diabetes and cardiovascular disease. She participates in the Coronary Artery Risk Development in Young Adults (CARDIA) study, which looks at the factors that contribute to the development of cardiovascular disease over adulthood in African Americans and non-Hispanic white Americans. Carson served as a member of the study’s Publications and Presentations Committee and Laboratory Committee. She also served as chair of its New Investigators’ Committee, where she guided study operations, provided scientific expertise, and played a pivotal role in integrating early career scientists into the study.
