= April Rapier =

American photographer

April Rapier (born 1953) is an American photographer. Rapier was born in Houston.

Her work is included in the collection of the Museum of Fine Arts Houston, the Rhode Island School of Design Museum and the Harry Ransom Center.
