= Averill, Minnesota =

Unincorporated community in Minnesota, United States

Averill
- Unincorporated community
- Location within Minnesota Location within the United States
- Coordinates: 46°58′15″N 96°32′50″W
- Country: United States
- State: Minnesota
- County: Clay
- Elevation: 915 ft (279 m)
- Time zone: UTC-6 (Central (CST))
  - Summer (DST): UTC-5 (CDT)
- Area code: 218
- GNIS feature ID: 639538

Averill is an unincorporated community in Clay County, in the U.S. state of Minnesota.

== History ==
A post office was established at Averill in 1899, and remained in operation until being discontinued in 1969. The community was named for John T. Averill, an officer in the Civil War and Minnesota legislator.
