= John T. Averill =

American politician and army officer (1825–1889)

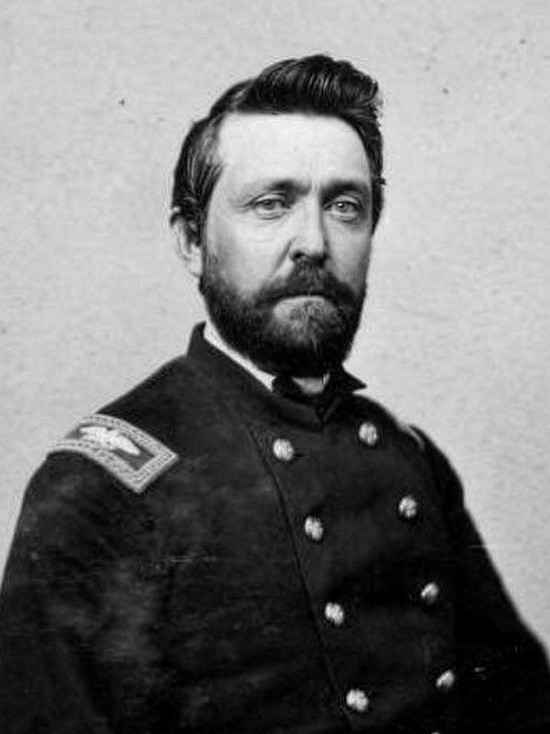
- Born: John Thomas Averill; March 1, 1825; Alna, Maine, U.S.
- Died: October 3, 1889 (aged 64); Saint Paul, Minnesota, U.S.
- Burial place: Oakland Cemetery; Saint Paul, Minnesota, U.S.
- Military career
- Allegiance: United States of America; Union
- Branch: United States Army; Union Army
- Service years: 1862–1865
- Rank: Colonel; Brevet brigadier general
- Commands: 6th Minnesota Infantry
- Conflicts: American Civil War
- Other work: U.S. Congressman

Member of the U.S. House of Representatives from Minnesota
- In office March 4, 1871 – March 3, 1875
- Preceded by: Eugene McLanahan Wilson
- Succeeded by: Horace B. Strait
- Constituency: 2nd district (1871–1873); 3rd district (1873–1875)

Member of the Minnesota Senate from the 12th district
- In office December 7, 1859 – January 7, 1861
- Preceded by: James Ridpath
- Succeeded by: Stiles P. Jones

Personal details
- Party: Republican

John Thomas Averill (March 1, 1825 – October 3, 1889) was a United States Army officer in the American Civil War who later became a U.S. congressional representative from Minnesota.

== Early life and education ==
Averill was born in Alna, Maine, March 1, 1825. He moved with his parents to Montville, Maine, in 1838 and graduated from the Maine Wesleyan Seminary at Readfield in 1846. He taught school for a short time, and subsequently engaged in lumbering for one year. Averill then moved to Winthrop, Maine, and engaged in mercantile pursuits for three years. In 1852 he moved to northern Pennsylvania and again engaged in lumbering until 1857, when he settled in Lake City, Minnesota. Once there, he engaged in mercantile pursuits and the grain business; was a member of the Minnesota Senate 1858–1860 for the 12th district.

== Career ==
On August 22, 1862, Averill was commissioned as a lieutenant colonel of the 6th Minnesota Infantry Regiment. He was promoted to colonel on November 22, 1864, and was assigned as Provost Marshal General for the District of Minnesota. He was honorably mustered out on September 28, 1865; and was made a brevet brigadier general on October 18, 1865.

In 1865, he ran for Governor of Minnesota. At the Republican State Convention of Minnesota on September 6, 1865, he led for the first two ballots before losing the nomination to William Rainey Marshall.

In 1866, he moved to St. Paul, Minnesota, and engaged in the wholesale paper and stationery business (Averill, Russell & Carpenter Paper Manufacturers). He was a member of the Republican National Committee from 1868 through 1880; elected as a Republican to the 42nd and 43rd congresses (March 4, 1871 – March 3, 1875); He was chairman of the Committee on Indian Affairs (Forty-third Congress); was not a candidate for renomination in 1874.

== Later life and death ==
Averill resumed his business activities in St. Paul, Minnesota, where he died on October 3, 1889; interred at the Oakland Cemetery.

He is the namesake of the community of Averill, Minnesota.

U.S. House of Representatives
| Preceded by Eugene McLanahan Wilson | U.S. Representative from Minnesota's 2nd congressional district 1871–1873 | Succeeded by Horace B. Strait |
| Preceded by — | U.S. Representative from Minnesota's 3rd congressional district 1873–1875 | Succeeded by William S. King |
