= A. T. Averill House =

Historic building in Cedar Rapids, Iowa, United States

- U.S. National Register of Historic Places
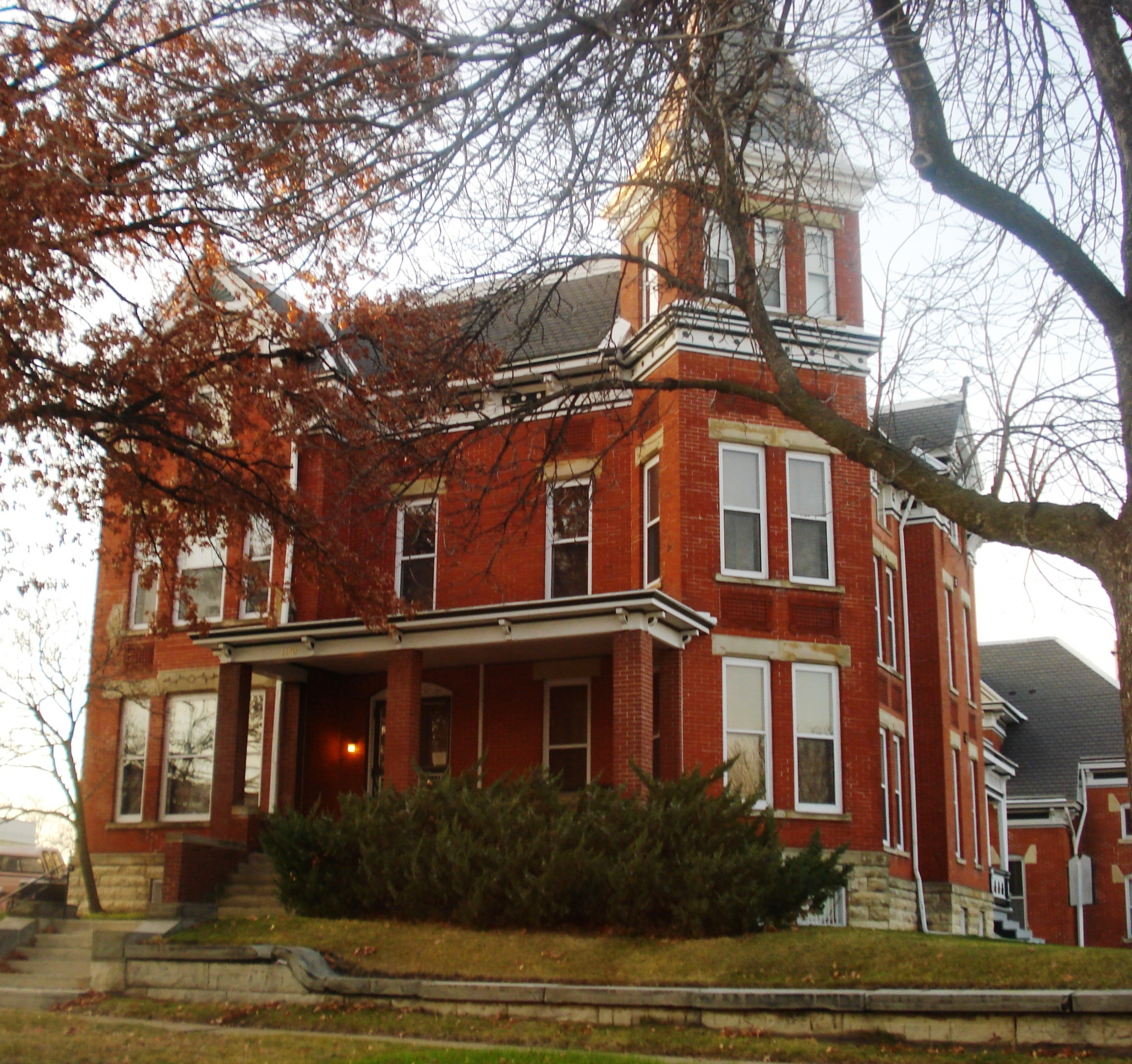

- Location within Iowa Location within the United States
- Location: 1120 2nd Ave., SE; Cedar Rapids, Iowa
- Coordinates: 41°59′2.9″N 91°39′26.8″W
- Area: less than one acre
- Built: 1886
- Architect: Smith & Fulkerson
- Architectural style: Late Victorian
- NRHP reference No.: 78001236
- Added to NRHP: November 28, 1978

The A. T. Averill House is a historic building located in Cedar Rapids, Iowa, United States. Local architects Sidney Smith and William A. Fulkerson designed this 2 1/2-story, brick Late Victorian home. It was completed in 1886 for farm implement dealer Arthur Tappan Averill. This is a more restrained version of the High Victorian style. The house features a truncated hip roof, a 2 1/2-story polygonal bay, and a rectangular tower set on the diagonal. The carriage house/barn behind the house is of a similar design, but older. The house was listed on the National Register of Historic Places in 1978.
