= April Brown =

American electrical engineer and materials scientist

April S. Brown
- Awards: Paul Rappaport Award. IEEE Electron Devices Society. (1992) Fellows. Institute for Electrical and Electronics Engineers. (1998) Fellow. American Physical Society. (2011) North Carolina State University Department of Electrical and Computer Engineering Alumni Hall of Fame (2017)
- Scientific career
- Fields: Electrical and Computer Engineering Research Focused in Nanoelectronic Materials and Devices
- Institutions: Hughes Research Laboratories (HRL LLC) in Malibu, CA (1986-1993) Army Research Office in the Physics Division (1988) Georgia Institute of Technology (1994-2002) Duke University (2002-Present)

April S. Brown is an American electrical engineer and materials scientist at the Duke University Pratt School of Engineering, where she is a professor of electrical and computer engineering and the former John Cocke Professor of Electrical and Computer Engineering.

== Education and career ==
After developing an interest in psychology as a high school student in Hillsborough, North Carolina, Brown was encouraged to study electrical engineering by her father, also an electrical engineer. She is a 1981 graduate of North Carolina State University. She went to Cornell University for graduate study in electrical engineering, completing her PhD in 1985.

She joined the University of Michigan faculty in 1985 as an assistant professor, but in 1986 moved to industry as a researcher for Hughes Research Laboratories, eventually becoming a senior scientist there as well as serving as a program manager for the United States Army Research Laboratory from 1988 to 1989. She returned to academia in 1994 as an associate professor at the Georgia Institute of Technology, then was promoted to professor in1999. At Georgia Tech, she was Pettit Professor in Microelectronics, an associate dean for the College of Engineering from 1999 to 2001, and executive assistant to the president before moving to Duke University as department chair in 2002. She was named John Cocke Professor of Electrical and Computer Engineering in 2008. In 2015, she returned to the Army Research Office for a two-year term as head of extramural engineering research there.

== Research ==
At Duke, her research has included the discovery of the stable coexistence of liquid and solid phases of gallium in nanoscale droplets. She is also known for her work on the design of high-electron-mobility transistors and on nanoscale fabrication using molecular-beam epitaxy.

== Recognition ==
Brown and her coauthors won the Paul Rappaport Award of the IEEE Electron Devices Society in 1992, for their work on high-electron-mobility transistor. She was named a Fellow of the IEEE in 1998, "for contributions to the development of lattice-matched and pseudomorphic high electron mobility field effect transistors".

She became a Fellow of the American Physical Society (APS) in 2011, after a nomination from the APS Forum on Industrial & Applied Physics, for "outstanding contributions to development and application of molecular beam epitaxy to the formation advanced device structures, with particular contributions to the advancement of the strained heterostructures forming modern microwave devices". The North Carolina State University Department of Electrical and Computer Engineering listed her in their alumni hall of fame in 2017.
