= April Christofferson =

American novelist

- Born: Chicago, Illinois, U.S.
- Education: University of Utah (BS); Gonzaga University (JD)
- Occupation(s): Author, former attorney

April Christofferson is an American novelist of environmental and political thrillers, including Trapped, Alpha Female and Buffalo Medicine.

== Background ==
Christofferson grew up in Chicago, and frequently spent summers around Yellowstone National Park as a child. She continued this tradition with her own children. Several of her thrillers are set in Yellowstone.

After earning her Bachelor of Science from the University of Utah, Christofferson studied veterinary medicine before attending the Gonzaga University School of Law. She received her Juris Doctor from Gonzaga in 1983. Before writing full-time, she worked as an attorney in the biotechnology industry, an experience that has informed her fiction.

In addition to writing novels, Christofferson has contributed articles to the Yellowstone Discovery, a quarterly published by the Yellowstone Association.

== Books ==
- After the Dance (1994)
- Edgewater (1998)
- The Protocol (1999)
- Clinical Trial (2000)
- Patent to Kill (2003)
- Buffalo Medicine (2004)
- Alpha Female (2009)
- Trapped (2012)
