= Averil Leimon =

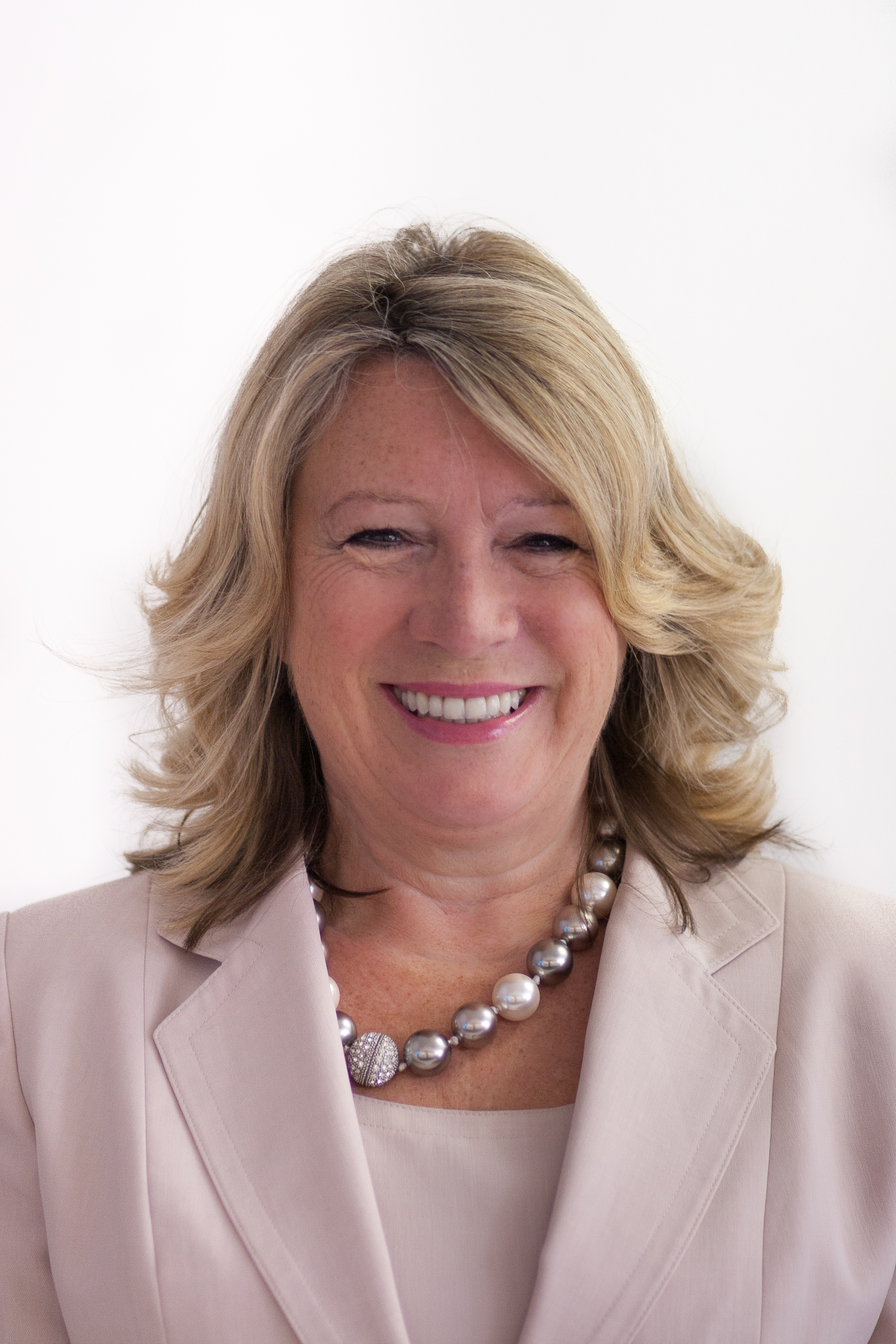
- Citizenship: United Kingdom
- Occupations: Author, executive coach, Psychologist
- Writing career
- Language: English

Within the field of psychology, Averil Leimon is an author, executive coach, leadership psychologist and is one of the first UK-based psychologists qualified in the academic field of positive psychology. Leimon is the joint editor of The Essential Coaching Series from academic publisher Routledge and is co-author of Essential Business Coaching and Coaching Women to Lead. She is also the co-author of Positive Psychology for Dummies and Performance Coaching for Dummies and the author of 100 lessons on happiness in 100 words or less.

Leimon is also co-founder of business consultancy White Water Group.

== Biography ==
Leimon gained a master's degree in Clinical Psychology at the University of Glasgow and a BA (Honours) in Psychology at Strathclyde University. She is a major contributor of psychological insight to television (BBC, CNN), radio (BBC Radio 4 Woman's Hour), newspapers (FT, City A.M) and magazines (Women in Business, Cosmopolitan). She is also a member of and a speaker for the British Psychological Society.

== Selected works ==
- Coaching Women to Lead, Routledge (East Sussex, UK), 2011
- 100 Lessons on Happiness in 100 words or less, Visual Aid Publishing Ltd (London, UK), 2011
- Essential Business Coaching, Routledge (East Sussex, UK), 2010
- Positive Psychology for Dummies, John Wiley & Sons (West Sussex, UK), 2009
- Performance Coaching for Dummies, John Wiley & Sons (West Sussex, UK), 2008
