= April Wright =

American female writer, director and producer

April Wright is an American writer, director and producer. Her debut narrative feature as a writer and director, Layover, won the Silver Lei Award for Excellence in Filmmaking at the 2009 Honolulu International Film Festival.

== Early life and education ==
Wright attended the Kellogg School of Management at Northwestern University for her MBA, and Bradley University for her Bachelor of Science in Business Computer Systems. While at Northwestern University, Wright served as the Co-President on the board of directors of the Northwestern University Entertainment Alliance, and as Chair of the Advisory Board for Sigma Delta Tau sorority at the University of Southern California. Previously, April Wright worked in new media as an HR Business and New Media Consultant for Mattel Toys. Wright eventually moved to Los Angeles to pursue film.

== Career ==
A member since 2011, Wright is currently the Foundation Manager of Women In Film-LA (WIF). In addition, April is an independent consultant for clients like Real D, and is involved with programming for the Sundance Film Festival and AFI Fest.

=== Killer Yacht Party ===
In 2006, April's film career began when she wrote and produced the horror film Killer Yacht Party, which was later distributed by Troma.

=== Layover ===
April's first narrative film, Layover, was the recipient of the Silver Lei Award for Excellence in Filmmaking at the 2009 Honolulu International Film Festival. Rotten Tomatoes called it 'a lovely little gem'. The film premiered at the 2009 Cinequest Film Festival and also screened at the Reel Women International Film Festival in Los Angeles.

=== Going Attractions: The Definitive Story of the American Drive-in Movie ===
The production of Going Attractions: The Definitive Story of the American Drive-in Movie was a lengthy process for Wright. Growing up outside of Chicago, Wright loved to go to the drive-in with her family in the summer. When drive-ins began to close down, Wright became fascinated with the abandoned structures. This motivated April to begin shooting the documentary, which took seven years to complete. During this time, Wright performed research on the history and cultural impact of drive-ins, including economic and sociological effects. She took cross-country road trips to every state except Alaska, and shot interviews with the people who were the most prominent in the drive-in industry. The documentary has been invited to festivals, such as the Independence Film, Art and Music Festival, Independence, MO, where it was the centrepiece film on August 9 and 10, 2013

=== Stuntwomen: The Untold Hollywood Story ===
Wright directed the feature-length documentary Stuntwomen: The Untold Hollywood Story, produced by Cheshire Kat Productions, released on September 22, 2020. It won the award for Best Documentary By or About Women conferred by the Women Film Critics Circle for 2020. The film is based on a non-fiction book by Mollie Gregory.

== Filmography ==
- Killer Yacht Party (2006)
- Layover (2009)
- Beyond the Passion Pit (2010)
- Going Attractions: The Definitive Story of the American Drive-in Movie (2011)
- Stuntwomen: The Untold Hollywood Story (2020)

== Awards and nominations ==
Award	Year	Category	Recipient	Result	Reference
Silver Lei Award	2009	Excellence in Filmmaking	Layover	Won	
Route 66 Film Festival Award	2010	Best Short Documentary	Beyond the Passion Pit	Won	
"Women Stand Up and Shoot" Competition	2010	Comedic Film Competition	My Boyfriend is a Blimp	Won	
