= Avril Dankworth =

English music educator (1922–2013)

- Born: Avril Margaret Dankworth; April 1922; Southend-on-Sea, Essex
- Died: March 2013 (age 90)
- Education: Royal College of Music; Trinity College of Music
- Occupation: Music educator
- Spouse: Les Carew (m. 1971; died 1994)

Avril Margaret Dankworth (April 1922 – March 2013) was an English music educator who established the week-long summer Avril Dankworth Children's Music Camps (now the National Music Camps) for children aged between 7 and 17 in Wavendon, near Milton Keynes, in mid-1970. She also sang, taught music, authored multiple books and helped introduce the idiom in school music curriculum.

== Early life ==
In April 1922, Avril Margaret Dankworth was born in Southend-on-Sea, Essex. Dankworth's family had connections to the music world; her mother Alice was a singer and choir trainer; her aunt played the brass; her uncle was a pianist; and her brother John Dankworth was a jazz composer and saxophonist. She was a Girl Guide, and liked the tradition of camp fire sing songs. Dankworth was educated at Walthamstow High School, Hockerill Teacher Training College, the Royal College of Music and the Trinity College of Music; she graduated from Trinity in 1951.

== Career ==
Beginning in the 1950s, Dankworth taught music in colleges and schools in multiple schools in London. She later chose to go freelance, sang and accompanied acts such as the George Mitchell Choir and Mátyás Seiber. Dankworth also travelled across the globe, adjudicating, lecturing and teacher training for the Service Children's Education Authority. She co-established the Sing for Pleasure movement in 1965 from being inspired by the French choral organisation À coeur joie. While attending one of the À coeur joie festivals in Vaison-la-Romaine in 1967, Dankworth thought of the idea of setting up a week long educational music camp for children to make the learning of music "fun". From 1970, she held four camps each for 70 children of all musical levels.

In the late 1960s, she moved to the Milton Keynes area and educated at Bletchley Park's Teacher Training College. In late 1969, Dankworth, her brother and his wife Cleo Laine, the jazz singer, purchased the Old Rectory, Wavendon. They had the idea of converting its stable block into a theatre. Dankworth approached her brother, who was enthusiastic about the idea, and founded the Avril Dankworth Children's Music Camps (now the National Music Camps) at the back of the stable block in mid-1970. The week-long summer music camps were for all children aged between 7 and 17 and there was no minimum entry grade only a musical love insisted on by Dankworth. Several of the former campers such as the record producer Guy Chambers, Christian Garrick, Tim Firth, the Sting guitarist Dominic Miller and Radiohead lead singer Thom Yorke all went on to attain successful careers in the music industry.

Dankworth was the author of several books such as Jazz in 1968, Mother's Help in 1972, Make Music Fun in 1973, and was instrumental in making music curriculum in schools better with the introduction of the idiom. She was Long Marston village hall secretary until 1990. From 8 December 1992 to 22 June 2000, Dankworth was director of Wavendon All Music Plan.

== Personal life ==
From 1971 until his death in 1994, she was married to the Big Band-era trombonist Les Carew. Dankworth received an honorary doctorate "for services to music education" in 1990. She developed a chest infection late in life and died in March 2013.

== Legacy ==
Margaret Gallagher for Milton Keynes Fawcett said of Dankworth: "She was an enthusiast, an enabler, and a doer - someone who didn't just have ideas, but made them happen. The National Youth Music Camps are her enduring achievement, and a superb reflection of the innovative spirit that has made Milton Keynes what it is." In late 2017, she was featured in the Women Who Made Milton Keynes exhibition that was set up by the MK Fawcett Society to celebrate "the lives and legacy of 10 pioneering women who helped create the city's identity and its landmarks"
