= April Daye =

American singer (born 1937)

April Daye (born 1937) was a burlesque dancer, fine arts painter, recording artist and jazz singer. She is the daughter and only child of a well known St Louis Musician, John Brunelli. Brunelli is from a St Louis show business family. He is a well known jazz guitarist and violinist who died at age 32. He was a recognized studio musician who had played for Carmen's Cavallero's recording sessions. Brunelli was part of the 5-piece combo led by Cavallero in St Louis in the 1930s. He was considered to be a young violin master. Another well known musician of this family was Nick Mucchi of the Nick Mucchi Orchestra.

== Career ==
She came from St. Louis, Missouri. She started off working at Arthur Murray's dance studio in St. Louis when she was 18. Soon after she left for New York City with her friend Genni Adams, where she began work as a hat check and cigarette girl at the Latin Quarters and the Copacabana, but eventually made it to the chorus line. When she went home for a visit, she met burlesque dancer Ann Stevens. Daye became Stevens' protege as Stevens helped Daye find work as a burlesque dancer. She was soon a headliner act and worked in clubs including Glen Rendezvous, Moulin Rouge and the 2 O'Clock Club. She met and worked with notable individuals including Rose La Rose, Tempest Storm, Frank Sinatra, Jayne Mansfield, Lili St. Cyr, Johnny Mathis and Buddy 'Nature Boy' Rodgers. Daye, also known as Miss Behaving, was often billed with the tagline 'As Refreshing As Spring.'

When she was 45, she was forced to quit dancing due to a serious leg injury. But she went on to have a varied career in other areas, using different names. She is now a jazz singer under the name Gypsy Eden.
