= April (disambiguation) =

April is the fourth month of the year.

April might also refer to:

== People and fictional characters ==
- April (given name), feminine given name
- April (surname)

== Films ==
- April (1961 film), a Georgian romance-drama film by Otar Ioseliani
- April (1998 film), an Italian semi-autobiographical film by Nanni Moretti
- April (2024 film), a Georgian drama film by Dea Kulumbegashvili

== Music ==
- April (South Korean group), founded in 2015
- April (Finnish band), founded in 2004
- April Records, a Dutch record label
- Schneeball (record label) or April, a German record label
- April Lawlor, an Irish singer and songwriter

=== Albums ===
- April (VAST album), 2007
- April (Sun Kil Moon album), 2008

=== Songs ===
- "April" (song), by Rose Gray, 2025
- "April", by Beach Bunny from Honeymoon, 2020
- "April", by Caravan Palace from Chronologic, 2019
- "April", by Deep Purple from Deep Purple (album), 1969
- "April", by Dmitry Malikov from Beads, 2000
- "April", by Kino from Zvezda po imeni Solntse, 1989
- "April", by Local Natives from But I'll Wait for You, 2024
- "April (feat. Intacto)", by Rauf & Faik from Я люблю тебя, 2018
- "April 2012", a 2018 track by Toby Fox from Deltarune Chapter 1 OST from the video game Deltarune

=== Classical music ===
- "April: Snowdrop", a piece for piano solo in The Seasons (Tchaikovsky) (1876)
- "April", one of the Two Pieces for Piano (1925) by John Ireland

== Other ==
- APRIL (protein), a tumor necrosis factor recognized by the TACI receptor
- April (French association), an association for the promotion of free software in the French-speaking world
- April (giraffe) (2002–2021), a captive reticulated giraffe
- April (tapir), the oldest living captive tapir
- Asia Pacific Resources International Holdings, developer of fibre plantations and owner of one of the world's largest pulp and paper mills
- Aprel TV, a former television channel in Kyrgyzstan.

== See also ==
- Avril (disambiguation)
