= April Kihlstrom =

American novelist

- Education: Purdue University; Cornell University
- Occupation: Novelist
- Spouse: Joseph Gerver
- Children: 2
- Writing career
- Genre: Regency romance
- Website: aprilkihlstrom.blogspot.com/p/home_16.html

April Kihlstrom is an American genre novelist specializing in regency romance novels.

Kihlstrom is a graduate of Purdue University, and holds a master's degree in operations research from Cornell University.

She was a graduate student in math at Cornell University when she married and followed her husband, Joseph Gerver (a fellow mathematician best known for his work on the moving sofa problem) to Paris where he had accepted a one-year academic appointment. She wrote her first novel, a contemporary romance entitled Paris Summer, during their year in France. It was published in 1977 by Thomas Bouregy & Co. in 1977. She published two more romance novels with contemporary settings before switching to novels set during the English Regency era.

She wrote a series of murder-mystery set in the Regency period with a recurring secondary character, the governess, Miss Tibbles, that enabled her to explore the limited choices available to women in the early 1800s, although, as the series became popular, Miss Tibbles became the lead character and found a traditional happy ending by marrying in middle age.

Maelstrom and Gerver have two children, one of whom has Downs syndrome. this led her to take the unusual step of including characters with Down syndrome in her novels, beginning with a romance entitled Twice Betrothed. She was among the earliest genre novelists to include plots dealing with incest (Mysterious Governess,) child abuse (Wary Spinster,) and abuse by a spouse (Counterfeit Betrayal).

Khilstom's regency novels, first published in a period when this genre of historical romances with no explicit sex, was wildly popular continue to sell in reprinted and e-book editions.
