= Gaston Chaissac =

French painter (1910–1964)

Gaston Chaissac (1910–1964) was a French painter. An autodidact and son of the French rural working class, he became involved in the art world when he lived next door to Otto Freundlich and Jeanne Kosnick-Kloss in Paris during the 1930s. They showed him modern art and supported his efforts to paint, helping him along and promoting his work. Gaston Chaissac is often considered to be part of the Art Brut or Outsider Art category. Some artists have described his style as "modern rustic." Chaissac's art was praised by Jean Dubuffet when he first came across it in 1946.

He also corresponded for some time with such prominent French artists and writers as Albert Gleizes and Raymond Queneau. Writing was an element of Gaston Chaissac's work from the beginning with his own signature. His signature evolved from being a signature to becoming an autonomous element in the composition that makes a sign, and continues with titles influenced by poetry and an exceptionally broad vocabulary.
