= Canton of Les Sables-d'Olonne =

Coordinates: 46.50°N 1.78°W

The canton of Les Sables-d'Olonne is an administrative division of the Vendée department, western France. Its borders were modified at the French canton reorganisation which came into effect in March 2015. Its seat is in Les Sables-d'Olonne.

It consists of the commune of Les Sables-d'Olonne.
