= 1987 in literature =

This article contains information about the literary events and publications of 1987.

== Events ==
- January 2 – Golliwogs in Enid Blyton children's books are replaced by the British publisher with gnomes after complaints of a racial offence implication.
- April – K. W. Jeter coins the term "Steampunk" in a letter published in Locus: the magazine of the science fiction & fantasy field.
- June – Virago Press of London publishes Down the Road, Worlds Away, a collection of short stories ostensibly by Rahila Khan, a young Muslim woman living in England. Three weeks later, Toby Forward, an Anglican clergyman, admits to writing them and the publisher withdraws the book. "He, unlike the editors at Virago, had grown up in precisely the kind of area and social conditions that the book described.... Although the book never claimed to be other than a work of fiction, the publishers destroyed the stock still in the warehouse and recalled all unsold copies from the bookshops, thus turning it into an expensive bibliographical rarity."
- July 31 – The United Kingdom Attorney General takes legal proceedings on security grounds against the London paper The Daily Telegraph to prevent it publishing details of the book Spycatcher. On September 23, an Australian court lifts its ban on the book's publication.
- August – A new building for the National Library of New Zealand in Wellington opens.
- unknown dates
  - Tom Wolfe is paid US$5 million for the film rights to his novel The Bonfire of the Vanities (published in book format in October), a record fee to an author at this time.
  - Ian Rankin's Knots and Crosses, first of the Inspector Rebus detective novels set around Edinburgh, is published in London.

== New books ==
=== Fiction ===
- Chinua Achebe – Anthills of the Savannah
- Peter Ackroyd – Chatterton (shortlisted for Booker Prize 1987)
- Douglas Adams – Dirk Gently's Holistic Detective Agency
- Martin Amis – Einstein's Monsters
- Gilles Archambault – L'Obsédante obèse et autres agressions
- Paul Auster
  - The New York Trilogy
  - In the Country of Last Things
- Iain Banks
  - Consider Phlebas (as Iain M. Banks)
  - Espedair Street
- Clive Barker – Weaveworld
- Greg Bear – The Forge of God
- Saul Bellow - More Die of Heartbreak
- Thomas Berger – Being Invisible
- William Boyd – The New Confessions
- T.C. Boyle – World's End (1988 PEN/Faulkner Award for Fiction)
- Marion Zimmer Bradley – The Firebrand
- James Lee Burke – The Neon Rain
- Truddi Chase – When Rabbit Howls
- Tom Clancy – Patriot Games
- Hugh Cook
  - The Wordsmiths and the Warguild
  - The Women and the Warlords
- Robin Cook – Outbreak
- Bernard Cornwell
  - Redcoat
  - Sharpe's Rifles
- Robert Crais – The Monkey's Raincoat
- L. Sprague de Camp and Catherine Crook de Camp – The Incorporated Knight
- Jenny Diski – Rainforest
- Jim Dodge – Not Fade Away
- Roddy Doyle – The Commitments
- Bret Easton Ellis – The Rules of Attraction
- James Ellroy – The Black Dahlia
- Carlos Fuentes – Christopher Unborn
- Neil Gaiman and Dave McKean – Violent Cases (graphic novel)
- John Gardner – No Deals, Mr. Bond
- Kaye Gibbons – Ellen Foster
- Ken Grimwood – Replay
- Suzette Haden Elgin– The Judas Rose
- Larry Heinemann – Paco's Story (1987 National Book Award for Fiction)
- Tom Holt – Expecting Someone Taller
- Josephine Humphreys – Rich in Love
- Dương Thu Hương – Bên kia bờ ảo vọng (Beyond Illusions)
- John Jakes – Heaven and Hell
- Tahar Ben Jelloun – La Nuit sacrée (The Sacred Night)
- Garrison Keillor – Leaving Home: A Collection of Lake Wobegon Stories
- Jesse Lee Kercheval – The Dogeater
- Ungulani Ba Ka Khosa – Ualalapi
- Stephen King
  - Misery
  - The Dark Tower II: The Drawing of the Three
  - The Tommyknockers
  - The Eyes of the Dragon
- Penelope Lively – Moon Tiger
- Ian McEwan – The Child in Time
- Betty Mahmoody – Not Without My Daughter
- James A. Michener – Legacy
- Alan Moore and Dave Gibbons – Watchmen (graphic novel)
- Finola Moorhead – Remember the Tarantella
- Toni Morrison – Beloved (1988 Pulitzer Prize for Fiction)
- V. S. Naipaul – The Enigma of Arrival
- Michael Ondaatje – In the Skin of A Lion
- Robert B. Parker – Pale Kings and Princes
- Gary Paulsen – Hatchet
- Ellis Peters – The Hermit of Eyton Forest
- Rosamunde Pilcher – The Shell Seekers
- Peter Pohl – Vi kallar honom Anna
- Terry Pratchett
  - Equal Rites
  - Mort
- Paul Quarrington – King Leary
- Edward Rutherfurd – Sarum
- José Saramago – Baltasar and Blimunda
- Leonardo Sciascia – Porte aperte
- Michael Shea – Polyphemus
- Sidney Sheldon – Windmills of the Gods
- Lucius Shepard – The Jaguar Hunter
- Carol Shields – Swann: A Mystery
- Danielle Steel
  - Fine Things
  - Kaleidoscope
- Scott Turow – Presumed Innocent
- Andrew Vachss – Strega
- Gore Vidal – Empire
- Barbara Vine – A Fatal Inversion
- William T. Vollmann – You Bright and Risen Angels
- Kurt Vonnegut – Bluebeard
- Gene Wolfe – The Urth of the New Sun
- Tom Wolfe – The Bonfire of the Vanities
- Gamel Woolsey (posthumously) – One Way of Love (written 1930)
- Jonathan Wylie – The First Named
- Roger Zelazny – Sign of Chaos

=== Children and young people ===
- Lloyd Alexander – The El Dorado Adventure
- Chris Van Allsburg – The Z Was Zapped (alphabet book)
- Tedd Arnold – No Jumping on the Bed!
- Janice Elliott – The King Awakes (first in The Sword and the Dream series)
- Anne Fine – Madame Doubtfire
- Willi Glasauer – Grüße aus der Fremde (Greetings from the Surreal)
- Witi Ihimaera – The Whale Rider
- Julius Lester – The Tales of Uncle Remus: the Adventures of Brer Rabbit
- Bill Peet – Jethro and Joel Were a Troll
- Ruth Thomas – The Runaways
- Theresa Tomlinson – The Flither Pickers (first in the Against the Tide trilogy)
- Audrey Wood – Heckedy Peg
- Jane Yolen – Owl Moon

=== Drama ===
- Nezihe Araz – Afife Jale
- Caryl Churchill – Serious Money
- Robert Harling – Steel Magnolias
- Liz Lochhead – Mary Queen of Scots Got Her Head Chopped Off
- Adam Long, Daniel Singer and Jess Winfield – The Complete Works of William Shakespeare (abridged)
- Stephen Mallatratt (adapted from Susan Hill) – The Woman in Black
- Warren Manzi – Perfect Crime
- Peter Shaffer – Lettice and Lovage

=== Non-fiction ===
- Claude-François Baudez & Sydney Picasso – Lost Cities of the Maya
- Allan Bloom – The Closing of the American Mind
- David Bohm – Science, Order, and Creativity
- Robert V. Bruce – The Launching of Modern American Science, 1846–1876
- Bruce Chatwin – The Songlines
- Nien Cheng – Life and Death in Shanghai
- Bill Cosby – Time Flies
- Joan Didion – Miami
- Andrea Dworkin – Intercourse
- Sita Ram Goel – The Calcutta Quran Petition
- C. Z. Guest – First Garden (approximate year – book undated)
- Robert Hughes – The Fatal Shore
- Georges Jean – Writing: The Story of Alphabets and Scripts
- Paul Kennedy – The Rise and Fall of the Great Powers: Economic Change and Military Conflict From 1500 to 2000
- Nicholas Kenyon (editor) – Authenticity and Early Music
- Steven Long – Death Without Dignity: The Story of the First Nursing Home Corporation Indicted for Murder
- Salman Rushdie – The Jaguar Smile: A Nicaraguan Journey
- Randy Shilts – And the Band Played On: Politics, People, and the AIDS Epidemic
- Donald Trump (attrib.) and Tony Schwartz – Trump: The Art of the Deal
- Peter Wright – Spycatcher

== Births ==
- February 11 – Julio Torres, Salvadoran writer, comedian, and actor
- February 27 – Alexandra Bracken, American young-adult novelist
- April 12 – Ilana Glazer, American comedian, director, producer, writer, and actress
- December 15 – Mayra Dias Gomes, Brazilian journalist and columnist
- unknown dates
  - Mina Adampour, Norwegian journalist, politician and activist of Iranian origin
  - Katherine Rundell, English children's writer and academic brought up in Zimbabwe and Belgium

== Deaths ==
- January 15 – George Markstein, German-born English journalist and thriller writer (kidney failure, born 1926)
- February 2 – Alistair MacLean, Scottish thriller writer (heart attack, born 1922)
- February 4 – Wynford Vaughan-Thomas, Welsh journalist and broadcaster (born 1908)
- February 10 – William Rose, American screenwriter (born 1918)
- February 22 – Andy Warhol, American artist, director and writer (cardiac arrhythmia, born 1928)
- March 4 – Maria Jolas (Maria McDonald), American-born French publisher and campaigner (born 1893)
- April 4 – C. L. Moore, American science fiction author (born 1911)
- April 7 – John Lehmann, English poet, biographer and publisher (born 1907)
- April 11
  - Erskine Caldwell, American novelist (born 1903)
  - Primo Levi, Italian chemist and writer (born 1919)
- April 12 – Oliver Stonor, English novelist (born 1903)
- April 24 – Josephine Bell, English novelist (born 1897)
- May 13 – Richard Ellmann, American-born biographer (born 1918)
- May 18 – Heðin Brú, Faroese fiction writer and translator (born 1901)
- May 30 – Norman Nicholson, English poet (born 1914)
- June 6 – Fulton Mackay, Scottish actor and playwright (born 1922)
- June 7 – Humberto Costantini, Argentinian writer (cancer, born 1924)
- June 22 – John Hewitt, Northern Irish poet (born 1907)
- June 29 – C. Hamilton Ellis, English writer (born 1909)
- July 26 – Tawfiq al-Hakim, Egyptian novelist and dramatist (born 1898)
- August 6 – Peter Whigham, English poet and translator (road accident; born 1925)
- August 18 – Dambudzo Marechera, Zimbabwean writer (born 1952)
- September 1 – Alan Reid ("Red Fox"), English-born Australian journalist (cancer, born 1914)
- September 25 – Emlyn Williams, Welsh dramatist (born 1905)
- September 30 – Alfred Bester, American science fiction writer (born 1913)
- October 3 – Jean Anouilh, French dramatist (born 1910)
- October 8 – Roger Lancelyn Green, English biographer and children's author (born 1918)
- October 9 – Clare Boothe Luce, American playwright (born 1903)
- October 31 – Joseph Campbell, American author and mythology expert (born 1904)
- November 29 – Gwendolyn MacEwen, Canadian poet (alcohol-related, born 1941)
- December 1 – James Baldwin, African American novelist (stomach cancer, born 1924)
- December 4 – Arnold Lobel, American children's writer and illustrator (born 1933)
- December 9 – Diana Forbes-Robertson, English writer and biographer (born 1914)
- December 17 – Marguerite Yourcenar, French novelist and essayist (born 1903)

== Awards ==
- Nobel Prize for Literature: Joseph Brodsky

=== Australia ===
- The Australian/Vogel Literary Award: Jim Sakkas, Ilias
- C. J. Dennis Prize for Poetry: Lily Brett, The Auschwitz Poems
- Kenneth Slessor Prize for Poetry: Philip Hodgins, Blood and Bone
- Mary Gilmore Prize: Jan Owen, Boy with Telescope
- Miles Franklin Award: Glenda Adams, Dancing on Coral

=== Canada ===
- See 1987 Governor General's Awards for a complete list of winners and finalists for those awards.

=== France ===
- Prix Goncourt: Tahar ben Jelloun, La Nuit sacrée
- Prix Médicis French: Pierre Mertens, Les Éblouissements
- Prix Médicis International: Antonio Tabucchi, Indian Nocturne

=== United Kingdom ===
- Booker Prize: Penelope Lively, Moon Tiger
- Carnegie Medal for children's literature: Susan Price, The Ghost Drum
- Cholmondeley Award: Wendy Cope, Matthew Sweeney, George Szirtes
- Eric Gregory Award: Peter McDonald, Maura Dooley, Stephen Knight, Steve Anthony, Jill Maughan, Paul Munden
- James Tait Black Memorial Prize for fiction: George Mackay Brown, The Golden Bird: Two Orkney Stories
- James Tait Black Memorial Prize for biography: Ruth Dudley Edwards, Victor Gollancz: A Biography
- Whitbread Best Book Award: Christopher Nolan, Under the Eye of the Clock
- Sunday Express Book of the Year: Brian Moore, The Colour of Blood

=== United States ===
- Agnes Lynch Starrett Poetry Prize: David Rivard, Torque
- Aiken Taylor Award for Modern American Poetry: Howard Nemerov
- American Academy of Arts and Letters Gold Medal for Belles Lettres: Jacques Barzun
- Frost Medal: Robert Creeley / Sterling Brown
- National Book Critics Circle Award: to The Making of the Atomic Bomb by Richard Rhodes
- National Book Award for Fiction: to Paco's Story by Larry Heinemann
- Nebula Award: Pat Murphy, The Falling Woman
- Newbery Medal for children's literature: Sid Fleischman The Whipping Boy
- PEN/Faulkner Award for Fiction: to Soldiers in Hiding by Richard Wiley
- Pulitzer Prize for Drama: August Wilson, Fences
- Pulitzer Prize for Fiction: Peter Taylor, A Summons to Memphis
- Pulitzer Prize for Poetry: Rita Dove, Thomas and Beulah
- Whiting Awards:

Fiction: Joan Chase, Pam Durban, Deborah Eisenberg, Alice McDermott, David Foster Wallace
Poetry: Mark Cox, Michael Ryan
Nonfiction: Mindy Aloff, Gretel Ehrlich
Plays: Reinaldo Povod

=== Elsewhere ===
- Europe Theatre Prize: Ariane Mnouchkine, Théâtre du Soleil
- Friedenspreis des Deutschen Buchhandels: Hans Jonas
- Premio Nadal: Juan José Saer, La ocasión

== Notes ==
- Hahn, Daniel (2015). The Oxford Companion to Children's Literature (2nd ed.). Oxford. University Press. ISBN 9780198715542.
