= Paraphonemic sound =

In phonology, a paraphonemic sound is one which does not occur in the general lexicon of a language, but is instead limited to mimesis and similar uses. Examples from English include dental and lateral clicks, used to express pity and to spur on horses, respectively; the glottal stop, found in uh-oh! and uh-uh; the linguolabial trill ("blowing a raspberry"); the syllabic nasal hmmm...; the syllabic fricatives shhh! and zzz...; and the velar implosives (the "glug-glug" sound of liquid being poured from a bottle).
