= King Bidgood's in the Bathtub =

1985 children's book by Audrey Wood

- Author: Audrey Wood
- Language: English
- Genre: children's literature
- Published: 1985
- Publisher: Harcourt Brace
- Publication place: United States
- Media type: Print (hardback)
- Pages: 32
- ISBN: 978-0590474993

King Bidgood's in the Bathtub is a 1985 picture book by writer Audrey Wood and illustrator Don Wood, about a king who neglects his duties to relax in his bubble bath, even as fellow royals plead for him to get out. Published by Harcourt Brace, the book won a 1986 Caldecott Honor.

== Plot ==
King Bidgood refuses to leave his bubble bath. One by one, a group of knights, the queen, the duke, and the rest of the royal court attempt to convince him to leave the bath and perform his royal duties. The king refuses to get out and instead conducts royal business from the bath, including fighting a war, having lunch, going fishing, and hosting a dance. Ultimately, a page finds a solution. The book ends with the words, "glug, glug, glug".

== History and reception ==
King Bidgood's in the Bathtub was the sixteenth book by married collaborators Audrey and Don Wood, who created on children's literature together from their home in Santa Barbara, California. Audrey Wood said her initial inspiration for King Bidgood's in the Bathtub came from two words she pulled out of her "idea box". She spent about seven months on the story. The surprise ending took her two weeks, and was inspired by the way she had gotten her son out of the bathtub. It took Don Wood about two years to research and create the illustrations, double-page oil paintings containing caricature figures in accurate Renaissance period fashions. Don Wood staged photos of the scenes before drawing them, casting his friends and family, including Audrey and their 11-year-old son Bruce, as the book's characters. His childhood friend posted as the king. "We brought a bathtub into the living room and dressed everyone up in costumes and makeup and ran through the skit" said Audrey. Bruce said that during his research process, he learned that "they did actually bathe with the king in those days".

The 27-page book was praised for its humor and illustrations. Reviewer Arthur Yorinks wrote in The New York Times that the bathtub scenes were the most fun and thus the ending was a relative disappointment, and he criticized the illustrations for the way the characters appeared to be overacting.

The double-page oil paintings were used for the book's illustrations sold for about $1000 in 1988 and were estimated to be worth about $3000 in 1990. They were purchased by children's book art collectors Ted and Cheryl Maddux, and from May to November 2014 they were displayed in a children's art exhibit with the rest of the Maddux collection at the library of Hancock College in Santa Maria, California.
