= Jesse Lee Kercheval =

American poet (born 1956)

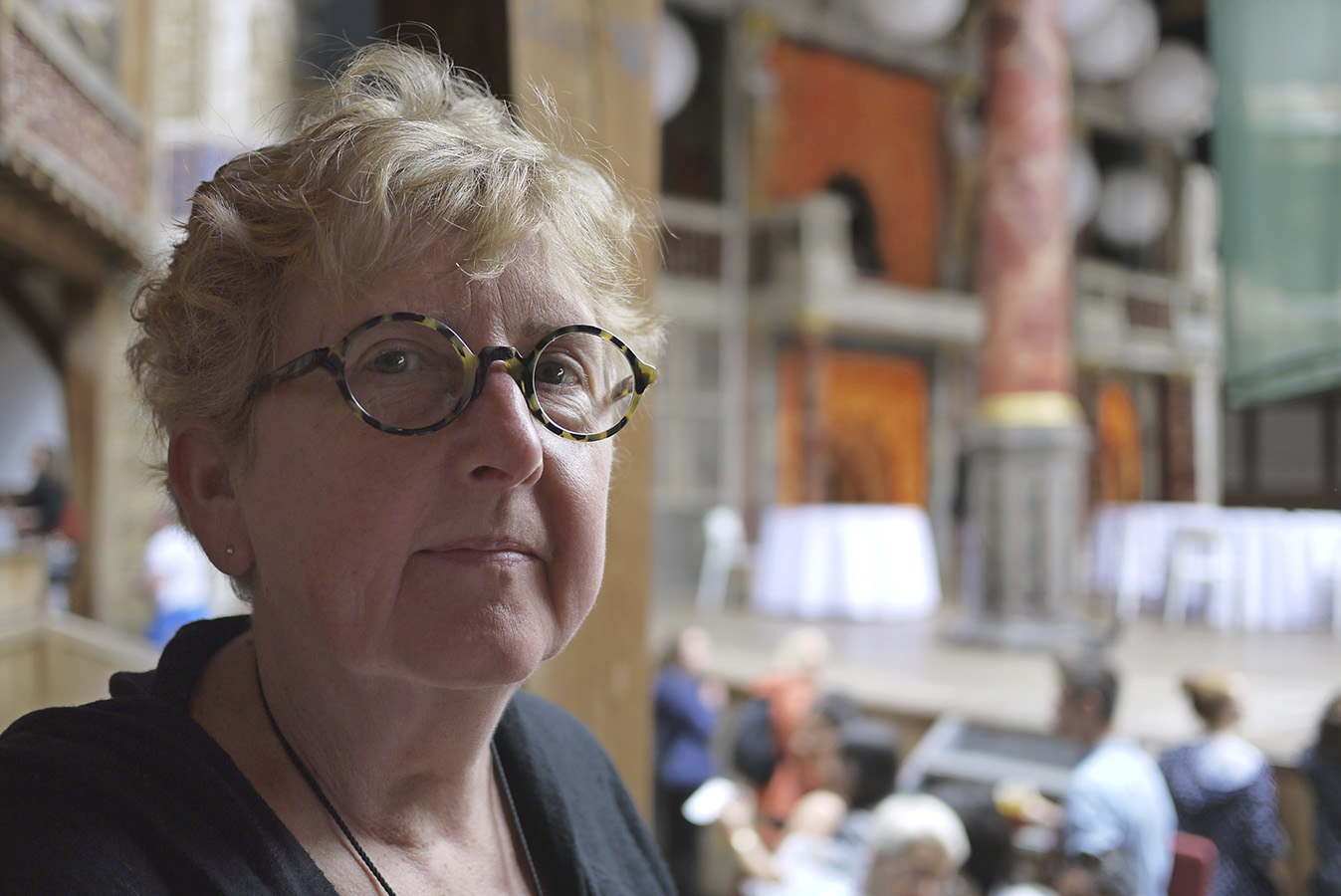
- Kercheval in 2016
- Born: 1956 (age 69–70); Fontainebleau, France
- Education: Florida State University (BA); Iowa Writers' Workshop (MFA)
- Occupations: Writer and teacher
- Writing career
- Period: 1987–present
- Genres: textbook, novel, nonfiction, poetry, memoir, translation
- Notable works: The Museum of Happiness, The Dogeater, Space, Underground Women
- Website: jlkercheval.com

Jesse Lee Kercheval (born 1956) is an American poet, memoirist, translator, fiction writer and visual artist. She is an emeritus professor at the University of Wisconsin–Madison. She is the author of numerous books, notably Building Fiction, The Museum of Happiness, Space, Underground Women and French Girl, and she is a translator of Uruguayan poetry.

== Biography ==
Kercheval was born in Fontainebleau, France, to American parents. Raised in Cocoa, Florida, she attended Florida State University in Tallahassee, Florida, where she studied with Janet Burroway, David Kirby, and Jerome Stern. She received her Bachelor of Arts in history at the university in 1983.

Kercheval earned her Master of Fine Arts in Creative Writing from the Iowa Writers' Workshop in 1986. She then taught at DePauw University in Indiana for a year.

Since 1987, she has been a professor of English at the University of Wisconsin in Madison. She was the founding director of the Master of Fine Arts Program in Creative Writing, the Zona Gale Professor of English, and the director of the Wisconsin Institute for Creative Writing. She lives in Wisconsin.

=== Short stories ===
Kercheval's first published book, a collection of short stories titled The Dogeater, won the Associated Writing Programs Award in Short Fiction in 1987. It was reprinted with additional material as Underground Women in 2019.

Kercheval's one-page short short story, Carpathia, first published in Jerome Stern's Micro Fiction (1996), is widely anthologized and used in creative writing texts. It is the story of a married couple on board the Carpathia, the ship that rescued passengers from the Titanic.

=== Novels ===
Kercheval's first novel is The Museum of Happiness, a story about a young widow and a half-Alsatian, half-German carnival worker falling in love in Paris in 1929. A German translation was published by Wilhelm Heyne Verlag in 1997. The Museum of Happiness was reissued by the University of Wisconsin Press in 2003.

Her 2007 novel-in-stories The Alice Stories won the Prairie Schooner Book Prize in Fiction. "By turns hilarious and devastating, The Alice Stories form a tender and poetic chronicle of one woman's journey through time, love, motherhood, and Wisconsin. It is a marvelous example of how connected stories can, even more effectively than a novel, evoke a life in all its ranging, episodic, and emotional complexity."

Her 2010 novella Brazil follows Paulo, a 19-year-old Miami bellboy, and Claudia, a 40-something Hungarian refugee, on a road trip. "The novella is set in the late 1980s, and its opening scenes take place in Miami during the era of Miami Vice, when South Beach was still tacky enough to provide an interesting springboard for a story like this one. However, Brazil doesn't linger in Miami for long; instead it roams from Florida to Wisconsin in a shiny black BMW."

Kercheval's 2013 novel My Life as a Silent Movie centers around the life of 42-year-old Emma, who flies to Paris after losing her husband and daughter in an auto accident. She then discovers that she has a twin brother whose existence she had not known about, and learns that her birth parents weren't the Americans who raised her, but a White Russian film star of the 1920s and a French Stalinist. The novel won the 2013 Edna Ferber Fiction Book Award from the Council for Wisconsin Writers.

=== Nonfiction ===
Space is Kercheval's memoir about her childhood and the Space Race. It was first published by Algonquin Books in 1998, and has been reissued several times.

The writing textbook Building Fiction:How to Develop Plot and Structure was published in 1997 by Story Press and reissued by the University of Wisconsin-Madison Press. It discusses sources for fiction, openings, points-of-view, characters and endings. It also discusses novels, novellas, novels-in-stories and short stories.

=== Poetry ===
Kercheval has published seven collections of poetry and numerous chapbooks. The first collection was World as Dictionary (1999), and the latest is I Want to Tell You (2023).

Since 2011 she has written poems in Spanish which have been published in Uruguay in the books Torres and Extranjera as well as in U.S. literary magazines. A selection of her English-language poetry was translated into Spanish and published bilingually in Argentina in 2020 and in Uruguay in 2023.

=== Spanish Translations & Anthologies ===
Kercheval has published translations from Spanish of the Uruguayan poets Circe Maia, Silvia Guerra, Mariella Nigro, Fabián Severo, Luis Bravo, Laura Cesarco Eglin, Javier Etchevarren, Tatiana Oroño and Idea Vilariño. She has edited or co-edited the bilingual anthologies América invertida: an anthology of emerging Uruguayan poets, Trusting on the wide air: poems of Uruguay and Flores Raras, a Spanish-only anthology of Uruguayan women poets born between 1845 and 1939.

=== Art Work ===
During the COVID-19 pandemic in 2020, Kercheval took up drawing because she “wanted to do something that wasn’t just sitting on the computer reading bad news all day”. Her drawings have been published as graphic narratives in literary magazines, notably Image, New Letters (Editor's Choice Award, Winter/Spring 2022) and the New Ohio Review (winner of the 2022 Nonfiction Contest). Her graphic memoir French Girl was published by Fieldmouse Press in 2024 and was listed as one of the best ten graphic novels of the year by The Washington Post.

=== Awards ===
Her memoir, Space, won the Alex Award from the American Library Association. The Dogeater won the Associated Writing Programs Award 1986 in Short Fiction. The Alice Stories won the Prairie Schooner Fiction Book Prize. Her novella, Brazil, was the winner of the Ruthanne Wiley Memorial Novella Contest. David Wojahn selected her poetry collection Cinema Muto for the Crab Orchard Open Selection Award. Her chapbook Film History as a Train Wreck was chosen by Albert Goldbarth as the winner of the 2006 Center for Book Arts Poetry Chapbook Prize. And Ilya Kaminsky chose America, that Island off the coast of France as the 2017 winner of the Dorset Prize. She has been awarded fellowships from the National Endowment for the Arts in both fiction and translation.

== Works (as author) ==
- The Dogeater, short stories, (1987) (ISBN 0826206328)
- The Museum of Happiness, novel, (1993) (ISBN 057119821X)
- Building Fiction: How To Develop Plot and Structure, textbook, (1997) (ISBN 1884910289)
- Space: A Memoir, (1998) (ISBN 1565121465)
- World as Dictionary, poetry, (1999) (ISBN 0887482856)
- Dog Angel, poetry, (2004) (ISBN 0822958406)
- Chartreuse, poetry chapbook, (2005) (ISBN 0975257390)
- Film History as Train Wreck, poetry chapbook, (2006)
- The Alice Stories, short stories, (2007) (ISBN 9780803211353 )
- Cinema Muto, poetry, (2009) (ISBN 9780809328956)
- Brazil, novella, (2010) (ISBN 9781880834862)
- My Life as a Silent Movie, novel, (2013) (ISBN 9780253010247)
- Torres/Towers, poetry chapbook, (2014) (ISBN 9789974719019)
- Extranjera = Stranger, poetry, (2015) (ISBN 9789974719170) and (ISBN 9781944884147)
- Underground Women, short stories, (2019) (ISBN 9780299323943)
- Jabko, poetry chapbook, (2019) (ISBN 9788089763474)
- America that island off the coast of France, poetry, (2019) (ISBN 9781946482242)
- Year by Year: a life, poetry chapbook, (2019)
- La crisis es el cuerpo, poetry, (2021) (ISBN 9789874785718) also published as Un pez dorado no te sirve para nada, (2023) (ISBN 9789915676197)
- I Want to Tell You, poetry, (2023) (ISBN 9780822967071)
- French Girl, graphic memoir, (2024) (ISBN 9781956636383)

== Works (as translator or editor) ==
- The invisible bridge = El puente invisible, editor & translator, (2015) (ISBN 9780822963820)
- América invertida: An Anthology of Emerging Uruguayan Poets, editor, (2016) (ISBN 9780826357250)
- Tierra, cielo y agua: antología de poesía medio ambiental = Earth, water and sky: an anthology of environmental poetry, editor, (2016) (ISBN 9789974719422)
- Confiado a un amplio aire = Trusting on the Wide Air, co-editor, (2019) (ISBN 9781944884659)
- Volver en tinta = Reborn in Ink, co-editor & co-translator, (2019) (ISBN 9781944585310)
- Fábula de un hombre desconsolado = Fable of an Inconsolable Man, translator, (2019) (ISBN 9780900575952)
- Mis Razones: mujeres poetas del Uruguay, co-editor, (2019) (ISBN 9789974726116)
- Confiado a un amplio aire = Trusting on the Wide Air, co-editor, (2019) (ISBN 9781944884659)
- Poemas de Amor = Love Poems, translator, (2020) (ISBN 9780822966258)
- Naturaleza muerta con derrotas = Still Life With Defeats, editor & translator, (2020) (ISBN 9781945680366)
- Noite nu Norte = Night in the North, co-editor & co-translator, (2020) (ISBN 9781732936348)
- La voz y la sombra = Voice and Shadow, co-editor & co-translator, (2020) (ISBN 9781944884758)
- Memoria y Reescritura = Memory Rewritten, co-editor & co-translator, (2023) (ISBN 9781945680625)
- Flores Raras [escondido país] poesía de mujeres uruguayas, co-editor, (2023) (Uruguay ISBN 9789915676043) (United States ISBN 9781956921281) (Argentina ISBN 9789873698286) (Spain ISBN 9791399038514)
- A Sea at Dawn, co-translator, (2023) (ISBN 9798986353920)
