= Jenny Diski =

English writer

- Diski (standing) in 1963 with Doris Lessing, with whom she had a complex relationship
- Born: Jennifer Simmonds; 8 July 1947; London, England
- Died: 28 April 2016 (aged 68)
- Occupation: Writer
- Writing career
- Genres: Autobiography, fiction, non-fiction, travel

Jenny Diski FRSL (née Simmonds; 8 July 1947 – 28 April 2016) was an English novelist, non-fiction writer and memoirist. She was a regular contributor to the London Review of Books; articles and essays she wrote for the publication are in the collections Don't and Why Didn't You Do What You Were Told? Her memoirs include In Gratitude, The Sixties, Skating to Antarctica, and Stranger on a Train: Daydreaming and Smoking around America With Interruptions, for which she won the 2003 Thomas Cook Travel Book Award.

== Early life ==
Diski was a troubled teenager with a difficult family background. Her parents were working-class Jewish immigrants to London. Her father, James Simmonds (born Israel Zimmerman), made his living in the black market. He deserted the family when Diski was aged six, which caused her mother, Rene (born Rachel Rayner), to have a nervous breakdown, and Diski was then put into foster care. Her father returned, but left permanently when Diski was aged eleven. She was taken in and mentored by the novelist Doris Lessing; she lived in Lessing's house for four years. Diski was educated at University College London, and worked as a teacher during the 1970s and early 1980s.

Diski spent much of her youth as a psychiatric inpatient or outpatient. At the same time, she immersed herself deeply in the culture of the 60s, from the Aldermaston marches to the Grosvenor Square Protests of 1968, from drugs to free love, from jazz to acid rock, and a flirtation with the ideas and methods of R. D. Laing. Taken into the London home of the novelist Doris Lessing, who was a school-friend's mother, Diski resumed her education and by the start of the 1970s was training as a teacher. She participated in the creation of the free school at the Freightliners City Farm and published her first work, while teaching at a comprehensive school in Hackney.

== Writings ==
Over the decades, Diski was a prolific writer of fiction and non-fiction articles, reviews and books. Many of her early books tackle themes such as depression, sado-masochism and madness. Some of her later writings, such as Apology for the Woman Writing (about the French writer Marie de Gournay), strike a more positive note, while her spare, ironic tone, using all the resources of magic realism, provides a unique take on even the most distressing material. Compared at times with her mentor Lessing as both were concerned with the thinking woman, Diski has been called a post-postmodernist for her abiding distrust of logical systems of thought, whether postmodern or not.

Diane Gagneret states that Diski's writings about depression and "madness" mirror those of Doris Lessing. Lynne Segal concurs, writing that the "smart but cynical" Diski could echo "her former surrogate parent and mentor".

=== Fiction ===
Diski wrote eleven novels. Her first novel Nothing Natural was about a sadomasochistic affair. Her only collection of short stories, The Vanishing Princess, published in England in 1995, was described as being about "pleasure, the writing life, the difficulties of family life, and the rules governing femininity."

=== Non-fiction ===
In The Sixties, Diski described her experience as a young woman starting out in life: "I lived in London during that period, regretting the Beats, buying clothes, going to movies, dropping out, reading, taking drugs, spending time in mental hospitals, demonstrating, having sex, teaching". She also described the decade's pervasive sexism, institutionalised in the countercultural cult of casual sex, asserting that "On the basis that no means no, I was raped several times by men who arrived in my bed and wouldn't take no for an answer". In the book, Diski returns repeatedly to the question of how far the cult of the self in the permissive society gave rise to 1980s neoliberalism, greed and self-interest. She concludes that, in the words of Charles Shaar Murray, "The line from hippie to yuppie is not nearly as convoluted as people like to believe".

Her 1997 memoir Skating to Antarctica, ostensibly about a journey to see the Antarctic ice, also tells much about Diski's early life. Kirkus Reviews comments that "Antarctica is not so much a destination as a symptom in this intense, disturbing memoir of a wickedly unpleasant childhood." Diski likens the bleak whiteness of the icescape to the safety of the unbroken whiteness of the psychiatric hospital of her depressed youth. In her obituary of Diski, Kate Kellaway calls Skating to Antarctica "the most remarkable of her books. It stars her daughter, Chloe, who steers Diski into finding out what became of her mother, with whom relations had been severed for decades. The narrative alternates startlingly between a trip to the frozen south and this search—Diski's reluctant advance towards catharsis."

Her 2010 non-fiction work, What I Don't Know About Animals, examines the ambiguous status of pet animals in Western society, at once sentimentalised and brutalised, or all too often abandoned. Nicholas Lezard, reviewing the book in The Guardian, admires Diski as "one of the language's great, if under-appreciated, stylists", in this case where "her honest, direct and intelligent prose has produced an honest, direct and intelligent look at relations between ourselves and the animal world."

Diski's final, valedictory, book, In Gratitude, was published shortly before her death in 2016. In it, she "elegant[ly]" takes a tour of her life, knowing she is soon to die of an aggressive and inoperable cancer. She expressly rejects the "cancer clichés", instead going back to her time with Lessing, and meeting famous literary figures, including Robert Graves, Alan Sillitoe, Lindsay Anderson, and R. D. Laing. The Kirkus reviewer sums up the book as "Sometimes rueful, often oblique, but provocative and highly readable."

== Personal life ==
She married Roger Marks in 1976, and they jointly chose the name Diski. Their daughter Chloe was born in 1977. The couple separated in 1981 and divorced. Her later partner, with whom she was until the end of her life, Ian Patterson, known as "the Poet" in Diski's writings, is a poet and translator, and was director of studies in English at Queens' College, Cambridge.

== Death ==
In June 2014, Diski was told that she had at best another three years to live. In September 2014, she announced that she had been diagnosed with inoperable lung cancer. She died on 28 April 2016.

== Prizes ==
- 2003 J. R. Ackerley Prize for Autobiography for Stranger on a Train: Daydreaming and Smoking around America With Interruptions
- 2003 Thomas Cook Travel Book Award for Stranger on a Train: Daydreaming and Smoking around America With Interruptions

== Works ==
=== Fiction ===
- Nothing Natural (1986)
- Rainforest (1987)
- Like Mother (1988)
- Then Again (1990)
- Happily Ever After (1991)
- Monkey's Uncle (1994)
- The Vanishing Princess (1995) (short stories)
- The Dream Mistress (1996)
- After These Things (2004)
- Only Human: A Comedy (2000)
- Apology for the Woman Writing (2008)

=== Non-fiction ===
- Skating to Antarctica (1997) (memoir; Chapter 1)
- Don't (1998) (essays)
- Stranger on a Train: Daydreaming and Smoking around America With Interruptions (2002) (travelogue)
- A View from the Bed (2003) (essays)
- On Trying to Keep Still (2006)
- The Sixties (2009) (memoir)
- What I Don’t Know About Animals (2010) (nature)
- In Gratitude (2016) (memoir)
- Why Didn't You Just Do What You Were Told? (2020) (essays)
