= Los Naranjos, Honduras =

Archaeological site in Honduras

Los Naranjos
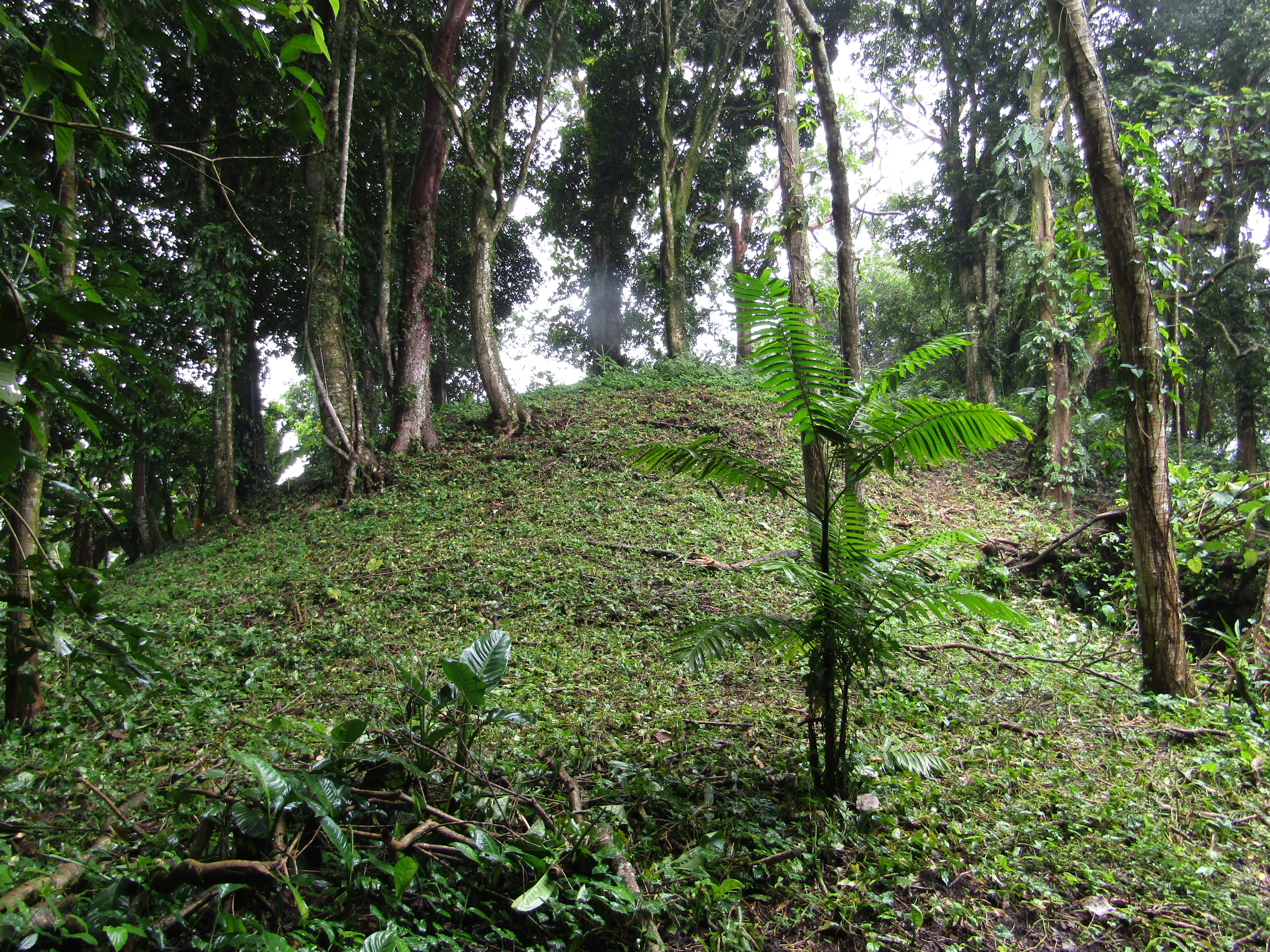

- Location within Honduras
- 14.938°N 88.026°W
- Periods: Jaral (800-400 B.C.); Eden I (400-100 B.C.); Eden II (100 B.C.-A.D. 550); Yojoa (A.D. 550-950); Rio Blanco (A.D. 950-1250)
- Associated with: Proto-Lencas
- Location: North shore, Lake Yojoa

Site notes
- Archaeologists: Frans Blom and Jens Yde, 1935 Claude F. Baudez and Pierre Becquelin, 1967-1969 Nobuyuki Ito, 2005-2009

Los Naranjos is the name for an archaeological region in western Honduras which belongs to the Lenca culture. It lies on the north border of Lake Yojoa. It is significant to the region because of its implications for determining where the Mayan frontier existed, as well as which ancient peoples were in contact and what relations between "tribes" may have been like. Whether or not the Olmec influenced the people of the Lake Yojoa region is disputed.

== Historical background ==
Los Naranjos archaeological site is located on the border of Mesoamerica. Geographically it is located near the southern coast of Mesoamerica. Monumental architecture began to be built in this area since the Early Preclassic period. Its cultural sequence is commonly divided into four phases: Jaral (800–400 BC), Edén (400 BC–AD 550), Yojoa (AD 550–950), and Río Blanco (AD 950–1250). The Edén phase is further divided into Edén I and Edén II.

The site appears to have reached one of its peak periods during the Eden phase, corresponding to the Late Formative and Early Classic period. During this stage, Structure 4 developed as a large platform with several buildings on top, interpreted as a kind of acropolis or political center for the Main Group. Later, during the Yojoa phase, construction activity expanded to other areas of the settlement, such as Groups 1 and 5.

== Archaeological excavations ==
In 1935, Frans Blom and Jens Yde conducted an excavation of a large mound at Los Naranjos. They found a large collection of polychrome pottery. They believed the large mound, which was one of many, was a burial mound because the bowls and pots they found were deliberately buried there. J.B. Edwards, a former Harvard botanist, helped Blom and Yde in their exploration of the site. He had excavated there in the past and had a large collection of antiquities. Yde purchased many of the specimens for the Danish National Museum. One particular vessel that Yde purchased became a topic of interest and was dubbed the "Yde Vessel".

In 1947, the site was visited by the American archeologist Samuel Kirkland Lothrop, during his visit he photographed some on the many mounds found on the site before they were restored excavated in later years. The photographs of Lothrop shows the magnificence the site had during its peak during the preclassic Mesoamerican period.

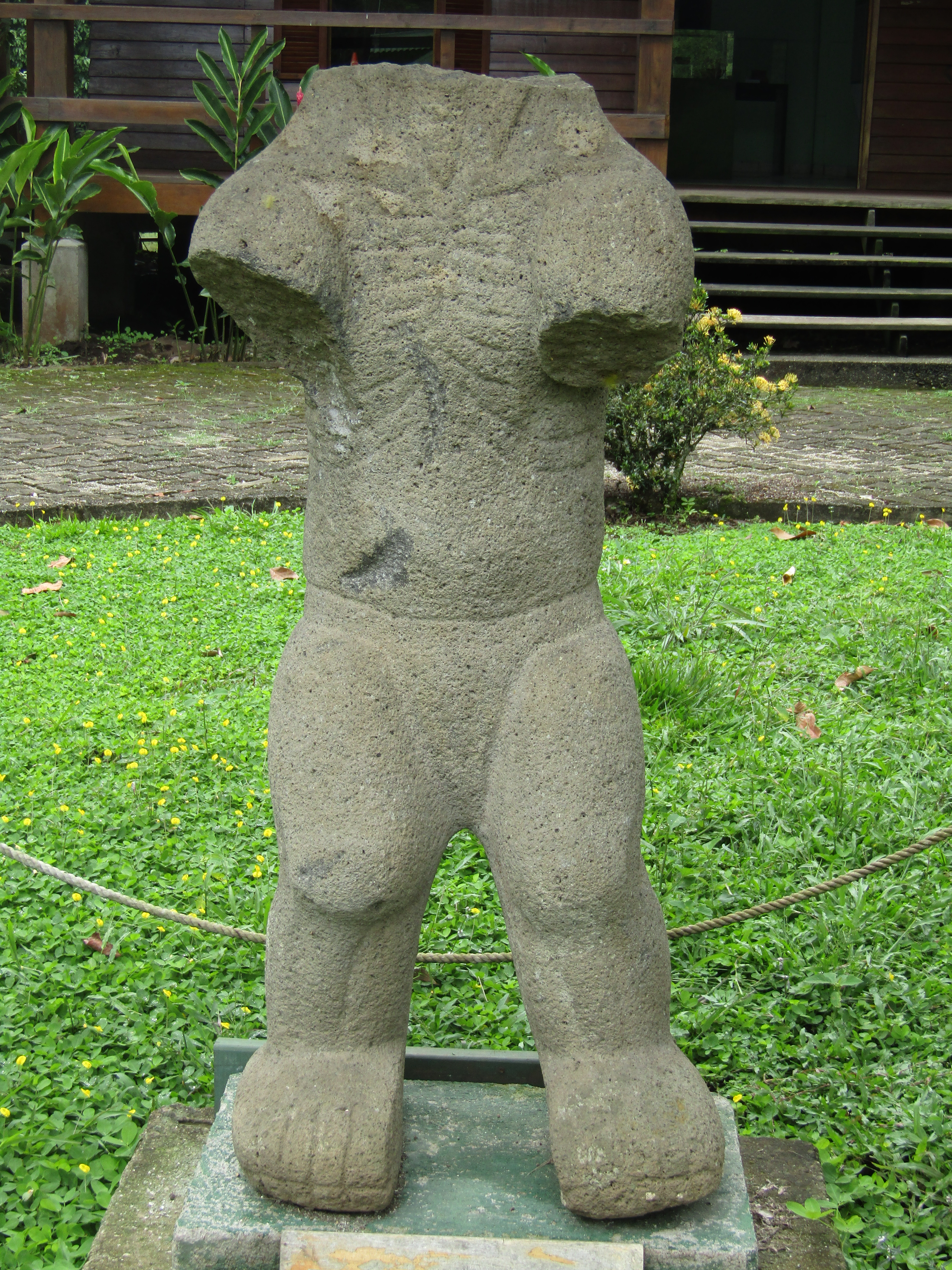
Anthropomorphic figure found in the excavations of the sitedurinthe 1960s.

From 1967 to 1969, archaeologists Claude F. Baudez and Pierre Becquelin periodically excavated the region. The two published the work Archeologie de Los Naranjos as a field guide for their findings. The work was written in French and an English translation is not readily available. The book includes both pictures of artifacts and tables that explain periods and locations of uncovered antiquities. They found sherds of ceramic vessels that came from four different periods, suggesting prolonged use of the site.

They used four phases from which the artifacts they discovered came: Jaral (800–400 BC), Eden which is divided into Eden I (400–100 BC) and Eden II (100 BC – 550 AD), Yojoa (550–950 AD) and Rio Blanco (950–1250 AD). Various antiquities found at the site include jade figurines, clay pottery and a jadeite hand axe, many of which suggest relation to Olmec influence in mesoamerica during the time. Clay pottery included findings of polychrome, monochrome and Ulua bichrome coloration. Each varying coloration seems to have existed in different periods.

The stratigraphy, or way that strata separate periods, suggests that the region had been occupied for a long period. The oldest layers of strata contained monochrome pottery with little or no design. Sherds of pottery in the nearby La Sierra site seem to have direct ties with the pottery of Los Naranjos in the Late Classic period. Newer layers of strata showed polychrome pottery that was more advanced. Most of the pottery found in the region was made locally, although some may have been traded for.

Radiocarbon dating of seven sherds from the excavation site provided the basis for the periods. The white-slipped polychrome pottery of the Terminal Classic period at Los Naranjos is "Las Vegas" polychrome, similar to types of "Las Vegas" polychrome at Comayagua. It is in close stylistic relation to sherds from Rivas Papagayo but earlier in date.

In 2005, a new excavation program began to study the origin and development of the ancient city of Los Naranjos. Excavations were carried out in Structures 2, 3 and 6. Also in the low or swampy area, several wells were dug to study the ancient diet, especially the agriculture of this site.

According to the artistic recreations of what it might looked like, it has come to be known that several pyramids were covered with mainly reddish and white stucco, similar to many structures throughout Mesoamerican history. The main structure would be derived as a platform where other smaller structures would be that would serve as sanctuaries.

== Yde Vessel ==
A clay vessel that is of particular interest was discovered at Los Naranjos. The vessel, in comparison with other pottery found at the site, is large and extraordinarily decorated. The remaining fragment is 24.4 cm (9.6 in) high and the rim appeared to have a diameter of about 23 cm (9.1 in). The decoration of the pottery is in black and red with the base of the vessel being orange. The designs depict "dancing figures" which is a common theme of art from the time period. The figures are seen in a cave.

Archaeologist and historians attribute the setting of the cave as part of a common motif, incorporating ideas of the first humans and genesis of humankind. Nielsen and Brady believe that a deity, represented by a crocodilian figure outside the cave, is a symbol of fertility and was believed to preside over the genesis of mankind.

In The Couple in the Cave Jesper Nielsen and James E. Brady propose that the people of Los Naranjos may have believed that Lake Yojoa and the Cave of Taulabé were the birthplace of humans. They go on to say that in Mesoamerican cultures, having territory near the birthplace of mankind was invaluable.

== Ditches ==
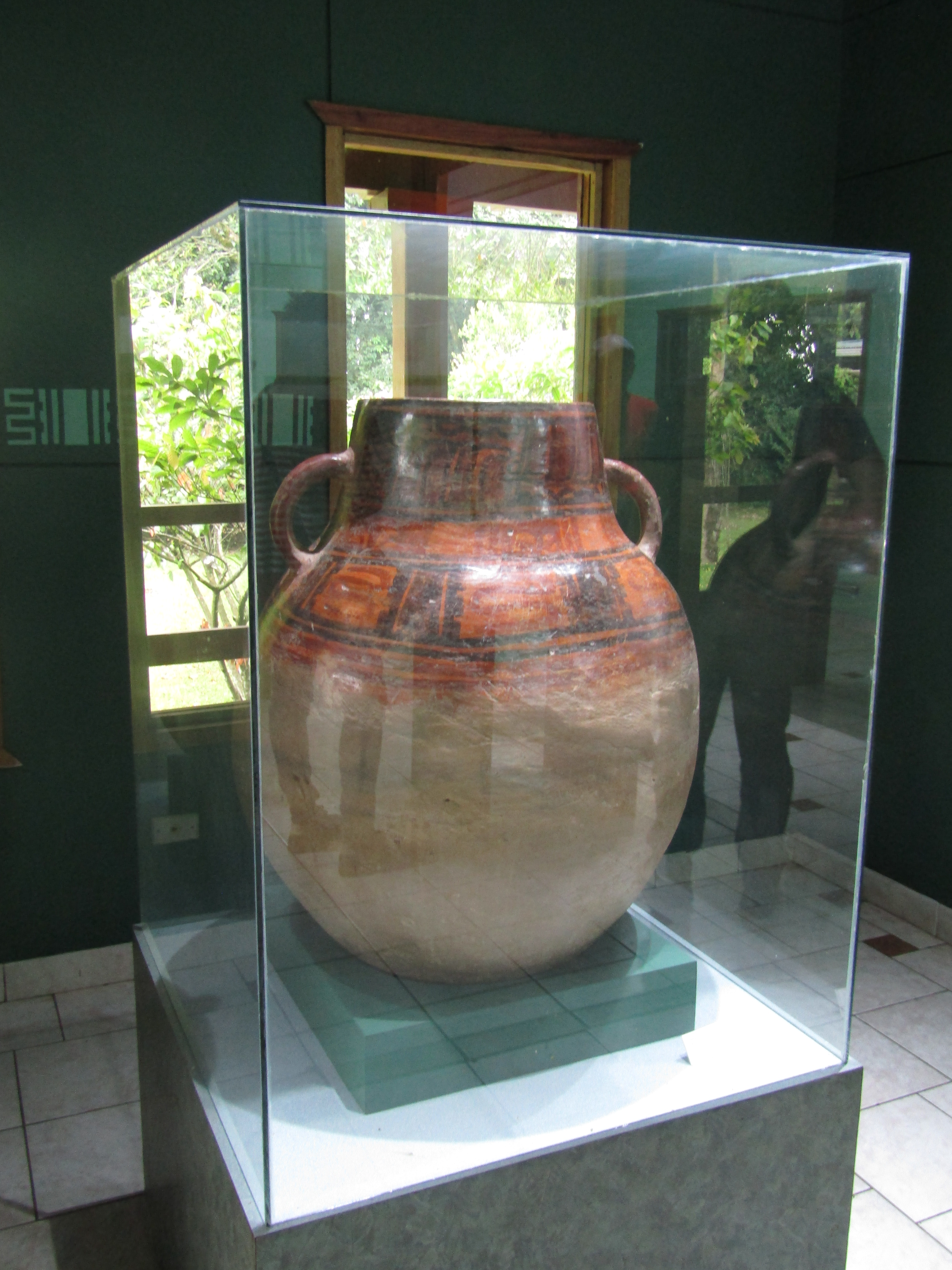
Giant jar found during the excavations.

The site contained two large ditches, one that stretched from Lake Yojoa to a pool just north of an encampment, made during the Jaral phase. The second ditch was probably constructed during the Eden phase. The purpose of the ditches is disputed, however there is evidence to support the idea that they were probably used as a defense mechanism. Another possibility was that they were filled with water, however the bedrock at the bottom of the ditches is seemingly too porous for a water well.

== People of Los Naranjos ==
The Lake Yojoa region of Honduras lies about 80 kilometres (50 mi) from what was defined as a probable boundary of the Maya territories. It is presumed that the people of Los Naranjos spoke Lenca, a language that is indigenous to Honduras and El Salvador. The Lenca language is nearly extinct in modern times and there is a movement to preserve and restore the language, as there are still people of Lenca origin.

Baudez and Becquelin found evidence for a hierarchical society at Los Naranjos. Among the buried, there was a varying array of antiquities, some more advanced than others. People having been buried differently suggested to Baudez and Becquelin that a hierarchy may have been in place.

== Affiliations with other Mesoamerican cultures ==
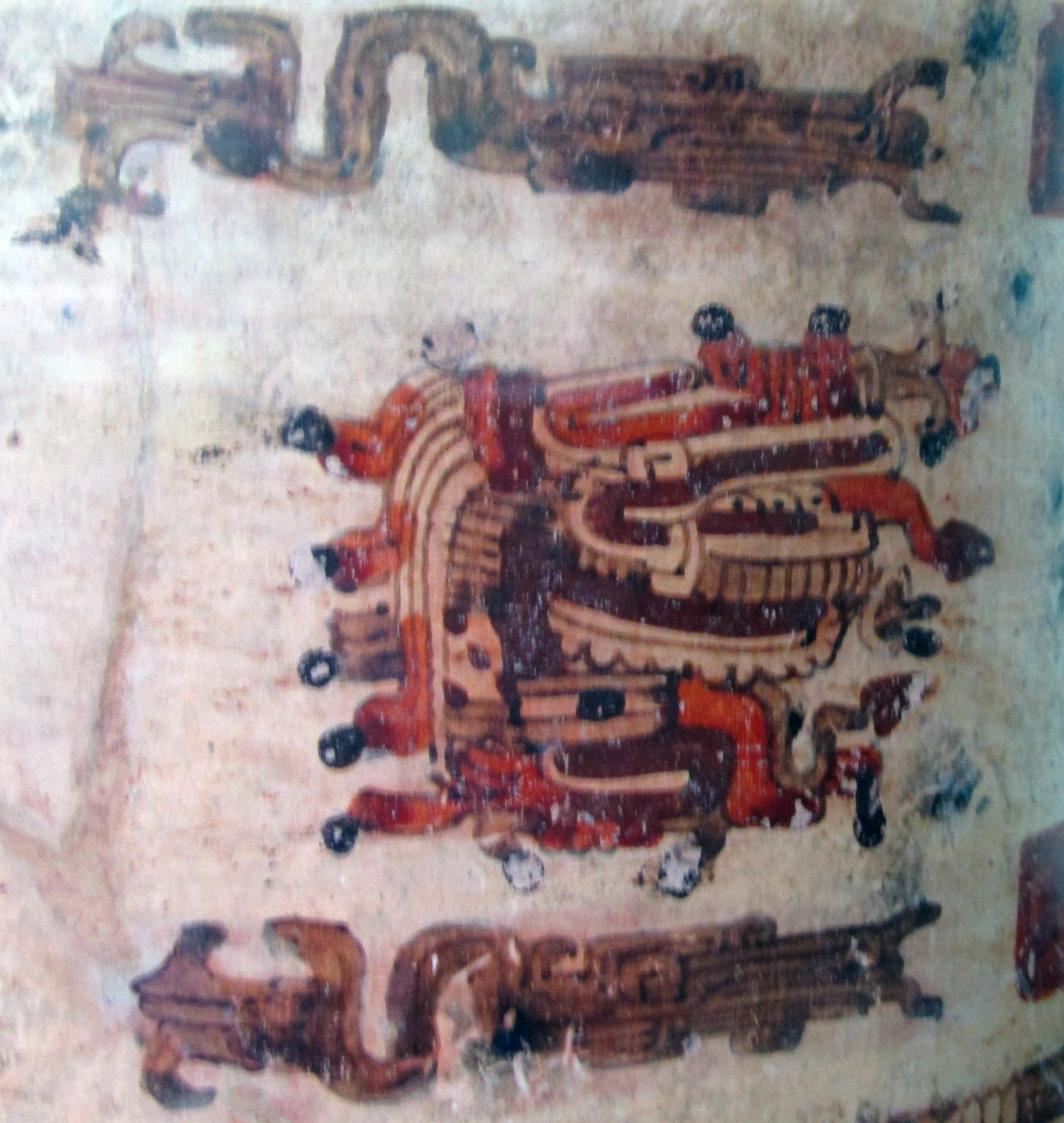
A design in one of the vessels found in the site.

It appears that the people of Los Naranjos had temporal variations in cultural relations with other Mesoamerican societies. Antiquities from the Jaral phase suggest relation with the Olmec. Jade workings and Olmec influenced sherds were present during the time period and trade may have been possible. During the phase Eden II, the pottery of the region had little or no similarities with Tzakol pottery.

The region may have been on the periphery of Maya and other Mesoamerican peoples during the Eden phase. Strata from the Late Classic Period, however, revealed that half of the pottery that the people used was of Maya relation. The Maya-related pottery was Polychrome.

== Bibliography ==
- Baudez, Claude F.; Pierre Becquelin (1973). Archéologie de Los Naranjos, Honduras. Etudes mésoaméricaines, no. 2 (in French) (1st ed.). Mexico D.F.: Mission archéologique et ethnologique française au Mexique. OCLC 5680095.
- Campbell, Lyle (January 1976). "The Last Lenca". International Journal of American Linguistics. 42 (1). Chicago: University of Chicago Press: 73–78. doi:10.1086/465390. ISSN 0020-7071. JSTOR 1264812. OCLC 1753556. S2CID 145706175.
- Healy, Paul F. (1980). Archaeology of the Rivas Region, Nicaragua. Waterloo, Ontario Canada: Wilfrid Laurier University Press. ISBN 0-88920-094-7. OCLC 7813615.
- Henderson, John S.; Ilene Sterns; Anthony Wonderley; Patricia A. Urban (Summer 1979). "Archaeological Investigations in the Valle de Naco, Northwestern Honduras: A Preliminary Report". Journal of Field Archaeology. 6 (2). Boston, MA: Association for Field Archaeology, Boston University: 169–192. doi:10.2307/529362. ISSN 0093-4690. JSTOR 529362. OCLC 8560818.
- Marcus, Joyce (October 1976). "Review Archeologie de Los Naranjos, Honduras by Claude F. Baudez and Pierre Becquelin". American Antiquity. 41 (4). Menasha, WI: Society for American Archaeology: 583. doi:10.2307/279035. ISSN 0002-7316. JSTOR 279035. OCLC 1479302.
- Nielsen, Jesper; James E. Brady (2006). "The Couple in the Cave: Origin Iconography on a Ceramic Vessel from Los Naranjos, Honduras". Ancient Mesoamerica. 17 (2). London and New York: Cambridge University Press: 203–217. doi:10.1017/S0956536106060123. ISSN 0956-5361. OCLC 21544811. S2CID 162467044.
- Strong, William Duncan; Alfred V. Kidder; Anthony J. Drexel Paul Jr (1938). Preliminary report on the Smithsonian Institution-Harvard University Archeological Expedition to Northwestern Honduras, 1936 (with 16 plates) (online facsimile at Internet Archive). Smithsonian Miscellaneous Collections, vol. 97, no. 1; Publication 3445. Washington, DC: Smithsonian Institution. OCLC 1050019.
- Thompson, J. Eric S. (June 1975). "Review: Archeologie de Los Naranjos, Honduras by Claude F. Baudez and Pierre Becquelin". Man. New series. 10 (2). London: Royal Anthropological Institute of Great Britain and Ireland: 321. doi:10.2307/2800512. ISSN 0025-1496. JSTOR 2800512. OCLC 42646610.
