= Nothing Natural =

1986 novel by Jenny Diski

- First edition (UK)
- Author: Jenny Diski
- Language: English
- Subject: BDSM
- Published: 1986
- Publisher: Methuen (UK); Simon & Schuster (US)
- Media type: Print
- Pages: 256 pages
- ISBN: 0671634593

Nothing Natural is the 1986 debut novel by Jenny Diski, initially published in hardback through Simon & Schuster. It follows a young woman who enters into a sadomasochistic relationship with a charming and domineering man. The book, perceived as an S&M-book by the New Yorker, received some backlash upon its release, as critic Anthony Thwaite criticized it as being "the most revolting book I've ever read," and the feminist magazine Sisterwrite chose to ban Diski from publishing with them.

== Synopsis ==
Rachel Kee is a depressed single mother who has been slowly withdrawing from the world around her. She's still suffering from the lasting effects of a disastrous childhood where her father abandoned his family, pushing Rachel's mother further into madness and prompting Rachel's removal and placement in a foster home. When she meets Joshua, she's almost instantly drawn to him. The two begin to indulge in a sadomasochistic relationship where Joshua will appear for a rough session of sex and then disappear for months on end. Eventually Rachel begins to question the relationship, especially after reading about the kidnapping and rape of a young girl, complete with a composite sketch that greatly resembles Joshua.

== Reception ==
Kirkus Reviews praised it as "an S-M novel with soul", calling it "effective, absorbing fiction". In contrast, The New York Times panned the novel as being "uninspired" and commented that the author "lectures rather than lets the reader experience. And she even fails to warm the cold bones of the central character, who ought to invite us to see in her desperation some of our own." The Washington Post heavily criticized the book, which they saw as a "sad day for feminism" due to the depiction of the relationship between Rachel and Joshua, and that they would "almost trade back Title IX and Supreme Court Justice Sandra Day O'Connor if I could be sure that not one reader would come away from this book believing that women (not to mention feminists) really degrade themselves and each other the way the women of this novel do." Dr Doris McIlwain commented on the book's characters, stating that Diski uses the characters' "failure to show proper feelings, and certain unlikely continuances in courses of action" to highlight the monstrosity of the book's plot, where Joshua rapes a child.
