= Rainforest (novel) =

1987 novel by Jenny Diski

- First edition
- Author: Jenny Diski
- Publisher: Penguin Books
- Publication date: 1987

Rainforest is a 1987 novel by Jenny Diski about a young female English academic whose ambitions are to lead a sane and sensible life and to contribute to humankind's understanding of the natural world but who eventually has a mental breakdown when faced with too many people surrounding her who, driven by desire and lust, behave irrationally, indifferently, and irresponsibly towards her, each other, society, and the planet.

Rainforest is set in London and Borneo. Diski says that because of her arachnophobia she wrote the novel "based entirely on textbooks and three trips to Kew Gardens' tropical houses".

James Hopkin called the novel a possible contemporary example of "texts in which the ecocritical aspect has been overlooked".

== Plot summary ==
Mo Singleton grows up in rural Sussex as the only child of John Singleton, a scientist and university lecturer, and Marjorie, a housewife. When Mo is still quite young, her father confides in her by telling her that he is betraying his incompetent and simplistic wife with a colleague at the university. Up to her father's premature death at 45 and beyond, Mo is able to keep their secret without once meeting her father's lover.

Following in his footsteps, Mo studies biology and moves to London, where she gets a job at a university. She enjoys teaching first-year students, especially challenging their faulty assumptions about nature and explaining to them what man's role in the big cycle of things really is. She visits her widowed mother in the country every once in a while and spends pleasant weekends with her, has a satisfactory relationship with her boyfriend Luke, a biochemist, and has started making plans for, her research project which will take her to an isolated spot in the tropical rainforest that covers large parts of the island of Borneo.

When, shortly before her departure, she meets Joe Yates, who has been hired as her replacement for the six-month period she will be gone, Mo is both appalled and attracted by his directness but rejects his overt sexual advances as well as his fatalistic philosophy of life. In Borneo, she behaves very professionally, fervently believing that through her academic work she will increase the sum total of human knowledge about the tropical rainforest.

Her mental breakdown is already looming but Mo is not yet aware of it. Her mind starts deteriorating rapidly when in the middle of her stay in Borneo, Joe Yates pays her a surprise visit. Questioning the validity and relevance of her findings, he eventually succeeds in seducing her—they have wild, unbridled sex in the wilderness—only to tell her afterwards that he is only passing through and his current girlfriend, one of his students, is actually waiting for him in the nearest town. Mo has to be flown back to England and is institutionalized. News of her beloved colleague Liam deserting his wife and young children for a first-year student only makes matters worse.

After her recovery, Mo gives up her academic career and becomes a cleaning lady, working to a fixed schedule and enjoying "the detail and planning involved." She sees a psychiatrist once a week and still has the occasional nightmare about the rainforest.

== See also ==
- Environmental fiction books
