= Legacy (Michener novel) =

1987 novel by James Michener

- First edition
- Author: James Michener
- Language: English
- Genre: Historical novel
- Publisher: Random House
- Publication date: 1987
- Publication place: United States
- Media type: Print (Hardback)
- Pages: 176pp.
- ISBN: 0-394-56432-4

Legacy (1987) is a novel by American author James A. Michener. Set during the Iran–Contra affair of the 1980s, the story follows Major Norman Starr, who is called to testify in front of a congressional committee to account for his involvement in covert military actions. The novel is interspersed with historical "flashbacks" as Major Starr reflects on his ancestors and their own roles in American history.

== Chapters ==
1. The Starrs
2. Jared Starr: 1726–1787 Jahayver
3. Simon Starr: 1759–1809
4. Justice Edmund Starr: 1780–1847
5. General Hugh Starr: 1833–1921
6. Emily Starr: 1858–1932
7. Richard Starr: 1890–1954
8. Rachel Denham Starr: 1928–
9. Norman Starr: 1951–
10. The Constitution of the United States

== Development history ==
The novel was published by Random House in 1987. At the time, it was Michener's shortest novel.

== Reception ==
Legacy received mixed reception from critics upon release. The Associated Press was positive, describing the story as being "packed with fascinating detail." United Press International was similarly positive, describing the book as inspiring readers "to re-read the Constitution." The Los Angeles Times described the book as having a dramatic ending but criticized some factual errors in the novel's historical sections. The Christian Science Monitor criticized the book for reflecting Michener's personal politics, which the article described as a "conservative viewpoint."
