= Ruth Thomas (children's writer) =

English author of children's fiction

- Born: 4 January 1927; Wellington, Somerset, England
- Died: 25 August 2011 age: 84
- Occupation: Author of children's fiction
- Writing career
- Notable work: The Runaways
- Notable awards: Guardian Children's Fiction Prize (1988)

Ruth Thomas (4 January 1927 – 25 August 2011) was an English author of children's fiction. For her first novel, The Runaways, she won the 1988 Guardian Children's Fiction Prize, an annual book award judged by a panel of British children's writers.

Thomas was born in Wellington, Somerset, England, to two primary school teachers.

Her books draw on her own experiences as a primary school teacher, at first in East London; during the 1980s in Kensal Green, north west London.

== Publications ==
- The Runaways (1987)
- The Class That Went Wild (1989)
- The Secret (1991)
- The New Boy (1992)
- Guilty! (1993)
- Hideaway (1994)
- The Paper Bag Baby (2002)
