= Ualalapi =

Ualalapi is a novel by Mozambican writer Ungulani Ba Ka Khosa. It was published in 1987, and won Mozambique's Grande Prémio da Ficção Narrativa in 1990.

Ualalapi is the name of a Nguni warrior who is destined to kill Mafemane, brother of Mudungazi (later called Ngungunhane). This fictional story, a collection of six loosely related episodes, describes the life of hosi ("king" in the Tsonga language) Ngungunhane, celebrity of the resistance to the Portuguese at the end of nineteenth century. Ualalapi's telling of the story creates an epic ambience, however, an oral tradition describes the emperor as a tyrant rather than a hero. The author tracks his rise to power over his murdered rivals and his eventual decline. The story is a disguised warning against tyranny. The rough and aggressive personality of the character is radically contrasted with his son Manua, who is passive and pro-Occidental. This opposition will display the conflict of the identity in transition to colonial rule. The violent drive in Ngungunhane's motivations depicts him as suffering from an incontrollable fear of losing power. This seems to be a metaphor of historical interpretation when considering colonial motivations.

In 2002, Ualalapi was announced by a panel of judges in Accra, Ghana as one of Africa's 100 best books of the twentieth century.

An English translation by Richard Bartlett and Isaura de Oliveira was published in 2017 by Tagus Press.

== Bibliography ==
- Chabal, Patrick. The Post-Colonial Literature of Lusophone Africa. London: Hurst & Company, 1996. Print.
- Chabal, Patrick. Vozes Moçambicanas literatura e nacionalidade. Lisboa: Vega, 1994. Print.
- Khosa, Ungulani Ba Ka. Ualalapi. 2nd ed. Lisboa: Editoral Caminho, 1990. Print.
- Laranjeira, Pires. Literaturas africanas de expressao portuguesa. Lisboa: Universidade Aberta, 1995. Print.
- Leite, Ana Mafalda. Oralidades e Escritas nas Literaturas Africanas: Ualalapi, Ungulani Ba Ka Kosa. Lisboa: Colibri, 1998. Print.
