= Paco's Story =

1987 novel by Larry Heinemann

Paco's Story is 1987 novel by Larry Heinemann. The novel is his second and it won the 1987 U.S. National Book Award for Fiction in a major surprise that has remained controversial. In particular, the New York Times was surprised by the win, soliciting commentary from other critical reviewers, like the LA Times.
