= Heckedy Peg =

1987 picture book by Audrey Wood

- Author: Audrey Wood
- Illustrator: Don Wood
- Language: English
- Genre: Children's picture book, fairy tale
- Published: 1987 (Harcourt Brace Jovanovich)
- Publication place: USA
- Media type: Print (hardback)
- Pages: 32 (unpaginated)
- ISBN: 9780152336783
- OCLC: 15107874

Heckedy Peg is a 1987 children's picture book by Audrey Wood. It is about seven children, Monday, Tuesday, Wednesday, Thursday, Friday, Saturday, and Sunday, who are transformed into food by a witch. The children are then taken to the witch's cave and are eventually rescued by their mother. In order to rescue her children, the mother pretends to cut off her feet at the witch's request. She then enters the cave and identifies which food item each of her children have been turned into.

== Reception ==
Booklist, in a review of Heckedy Peg, found "The inherent drama of the story, combined with the haunting images the art provides, gives the picture book a timeless quality. " and the School Library Journal wrote "This story, deep and rich with folk wisdom, is stunningly illustrated with Don Wood's luminous paintings. .. A tour de force in every way." Kirkus Reviews called it "An original fairy tale" and "Admirable, yet, for all its proficiency, almost stolid--perhaps a little less definition would leave more room for the imagination."

Publishers Weekly wrote "Although text and art in this picture book match as hand and glove, it is really the ornate illustrations that carry it aloft to the dimension of classic fairytale" and "The story has essential elements of playfulness and eeriness; also evident is a poetic license that effects a looseness in structure." while Betty Criscoe wrote "A well-written and beautifully illustrated tale, Heckedy Peg contains the characteristics of a classic."

== Awards and nominations ==
1987 Irma Simonton Black Book Award - winner
1989 Colorado Children's Book Award - runner-up
1990 Nevada Young Readers' Award - winner
1992 Young Hoosier Award - winner
