= The First Named =

The First Named is a 1987 novel written by Jonathan Wylie.

== Plot summary ==
The First Named is a novel in which the narrative is set on the island of Ark, and revolves around a conflict between good and evil, following the efforts of the protagonists as they navigate this struggle.

== Publication history ==
The First Named is the opening volume of the Servants of Ark trilogy.

== Reception ==
Wendy Graham reviewed The First Named for Adventurer magazine and stated that "The truth is, it isn't too bad, and I quite enjoyed it. The magic isn't too magic, the magician is quite human (as are the humans), and it is quite an imaginative tale. I'm not going to go jumping through hoops about it, but it's not too bad, not bad at all."

== Reviews ==
- Review by Laurence Scotford (1987) in Paperback Inferno, #66
- Review by Pauline E. Dungate [as by Pauline Morgan] (1987) in Fantasy Review, July-August 1987
- Review by John C. Bunnell (1988) in Dragon Magazine, March 1988
- Review by Mary Frances Zambreno (1988) in American Fantasy, Winter 1988
