= The Launching of Modern American Science, 1846–1876 =

1987 book by Robert V. Bruce

- Author: Robert V. Bruce
- Genre: History
- Publisher: Knopf
- Publication date: 1987
- Publication place: United States
- Pages: 464
- Awards: Pulitzer Prize for History
- ISBN: 978-1597401920

The Launching of Modern American Science, 1846–1876 is a 1987 nonfiction book by American historian Robert V. Bruce, published by Knopf. The book is a social history chronicling a three-decade period in American science. It won the 1988 Pulitzer Prize for History.
