= The Runaways (novel) =

1987 children's novel by Ruth Thomas

- First edition
- Author: Ruth Thomas
- Language: English
- Genre: Children's
- Set in: England
- Publisher: Hutchinson
- Publication date: 1987
- Publication place: England
- Media type: Print
- Pages: 300
- Awards: Guardian Children's Fiction Prize
- ISBN: 0091726336
- OCLC: 59048709

The Runaways is a children's novel by the English author Ruth Thomas, published by Hutchinson in 1987. It features eleven-year-old Julia and Nathan who find "an enormous sum of money", do not report it, and flee the city when they are threatened with punishment. Opening in the East End of London where Thomas was a primary school teacher, the story moves to places including Brighton and Exmoor.

Thomas and The Runaways won the Guardian Children's Fiction Prize, a once-in-a-lifetime book award judged by a panel of British children's writers.

It drew critical acclaim, with The Guardian declaring it "A first rate novel".

Lippincott published the first U.S. edition in 1989.
