= Mina Adampour =

Norwegian-Iranian commentator, columnist and medical doctor

Mina Adampour (Persian: مینا آدمپور born 1987) is a Norwegian-Iranian commentator, columnist and medical doctor. She is a board member of His Royal Highness Crown Prince Haakon and Her Royal Highness Crown Princess Mette-Marit's Foundation and is appointed by the Norwegian Directorate of Health as a committee member to the Karl Evang Prize.

== Early life and education ==
Mina Adampour was born in Karachi, Pakistan and has an Iranian background. She attended Foss Upper Secondary School in Oslo. Adampour has lived in both Bodø and Oslo. She's currently a medical doctor graduate from the University of Oslo.

== Career ==
Adampour was involved in politics from an early age. In 2003, at age-sixteen, she organized a large anti-war demonstration outside the US Embassy. Even though she wasn't active in the revolutionary socialist party Red Electoral Alliance, she was asked to run as their candidate in the 2007 local elections and accepted. After the election, she gained a seat in the borough of Grünerløkka. However, Adampour declined to represent the new communist party Red at the 2011 local elections. On 1 November 2016, the organization Landsforeningen Mot Rasisme (The National Association Against Racism) was launched with Adampour as leader.

She has written extensively and have been published in Dagsavisen, Klassekampen, Ny Tid and Utrop. She is also a columnist in the largest newspaper in Norway, Aftenposten. Adampour is frequently seen in public debates. In a debate about immigration on TV2 in February 2017, Adampour caused some reactions from right-wing circles after stating that "Being blonde and blue-eyed is going to disappear!"

In 2011, Adampour received national attention when Queen Sonja of Norway and Crown Princess Mette-Marit visited her family home.
