= Death Without Dignity =

1987 book by Steven Long

- Author: Steven Long
- Language: English
- Genre: Non-fiction, True crime
- Publisher: Texas Monthly Press
- Publication date: March 1987
- Publication place: United States
- Media type: Hardcover
- Pages: 280
- ISBN: 0877190623
- Followed by: Out of Control (2004)

Death Without Dignity: The Story of the First Nursing Home Corporation Indicted for Murder is a true crime non-fiction book by American author Steven Long that was released in 1987 by Texas Monthly Press. It was Long's first book, written while he was publisher and editor of the alternative weekly newspaper In Between.

== Storyline ==
Death Without Dignity is an account of a six-month 1985 trial in which the State of Texas charged Autumn Hills Nursing Home and five executives of the corporate chain for the murder of an 87-year-old woman. The case was the first Texas corporation indicted for murder in one of the longest trials in Texas history, that resulted from charges that the Texas nursing home had mistreated and abused its patients.

The book focuses on 87-year-old Elnora Breed, 73-year-old Edna Mae Witt, and 61 other patients and how they died while in the care of the facility. The Houston Post described the book as a "case study." In the words of the Post's Jimmie Woods, "The reader is left to decide if this was a prosecution or -- as the defense insisted -- a persecution."

Autumn Hills Nursing Home was defended by attorney Thomas Sartwelle and prosecuted by Assistant District Attorney David Marks. It ended in a mistrial.

== Critical reception ==
The book was cited by Creighton Law Review as an illustration of corporations and malpractice, in a review titled "Malpractice Liability in Long-Term Care: A Changing Environment."

Publishers Weekly called Death Without Dignity an "exposition of a major social problem inadequately funded by Social Security" where the author "credits a Galveston assistant district attorney for uncovering patient abuses, described here in harrowing detail, and doggedly pursuing the case despite political pressure from the powerful nursing home lobby and his own superiors."

Kirkus Reviews magazine wrote that the book "serves as a useful reminder that the problem of what to do with disabled older citizens still remains to be adequately addressed in our society."

== Awards ==
The book won a 1987 Gavel Award from the State Bar of Texas for distinguished journalism.
