= Lost Cities of the Maya =

1987 book by Claude-François Baudez and Sydney Picasso

- First French edition. The cover featuring El Castillo of Tulum, lithograph by Frederick Catherwood, 1844.
- Author: Claude-François Baudez; Sydney Picasso
- Original title: Les cités perdues des Mayas
- Translator: Caroline Palmer
- Cover artist: Frederick Catherwood
- Language: French
- Series: Découvertes Gallimard●Archéologie (FR); Abrams Discoveries (US); New Horizons (UK)
- Release number: 20th in collection
- Subject: Maya archaeology
- Genre: Nonfiction monograph
- Publisher: Éditions Gallimard (FR); Harry N. Abrams (US); Thames & Hudson (UK)
- Publication date: 4 December 1987; 23 October 2008 (new ed.)
- Publication place: France
- English publication date: 1992
- Media type: Print (paperback)
- Pages: 176 pp.
- ISBN: 978-2-0705-3035-9 (first edition)
- OCLC: 798831222
- Preceded by: Les fossiles, empreinte des mondes disparus
- Followed by: Sur des mers inconnues : Bougainville, Cook, Lapérouse

Lost Cities of the Maya (French: Les cités perdues des Mayas) is a 1987 illustrated monograph on Maya archaeology. Co-written by the French Mayanist and iconologist Claude-François Baudez and art historian Sydney Picasso, and published in pocket format by Éditions Gallimard as the 20th volume in their "Découvertes" collection (known as "Abrams Discoveries" in the United States, and "New Horizons" in the United Kingdom). The book was adapted into a documentary film of the same name in 2000.

== Introduction ==
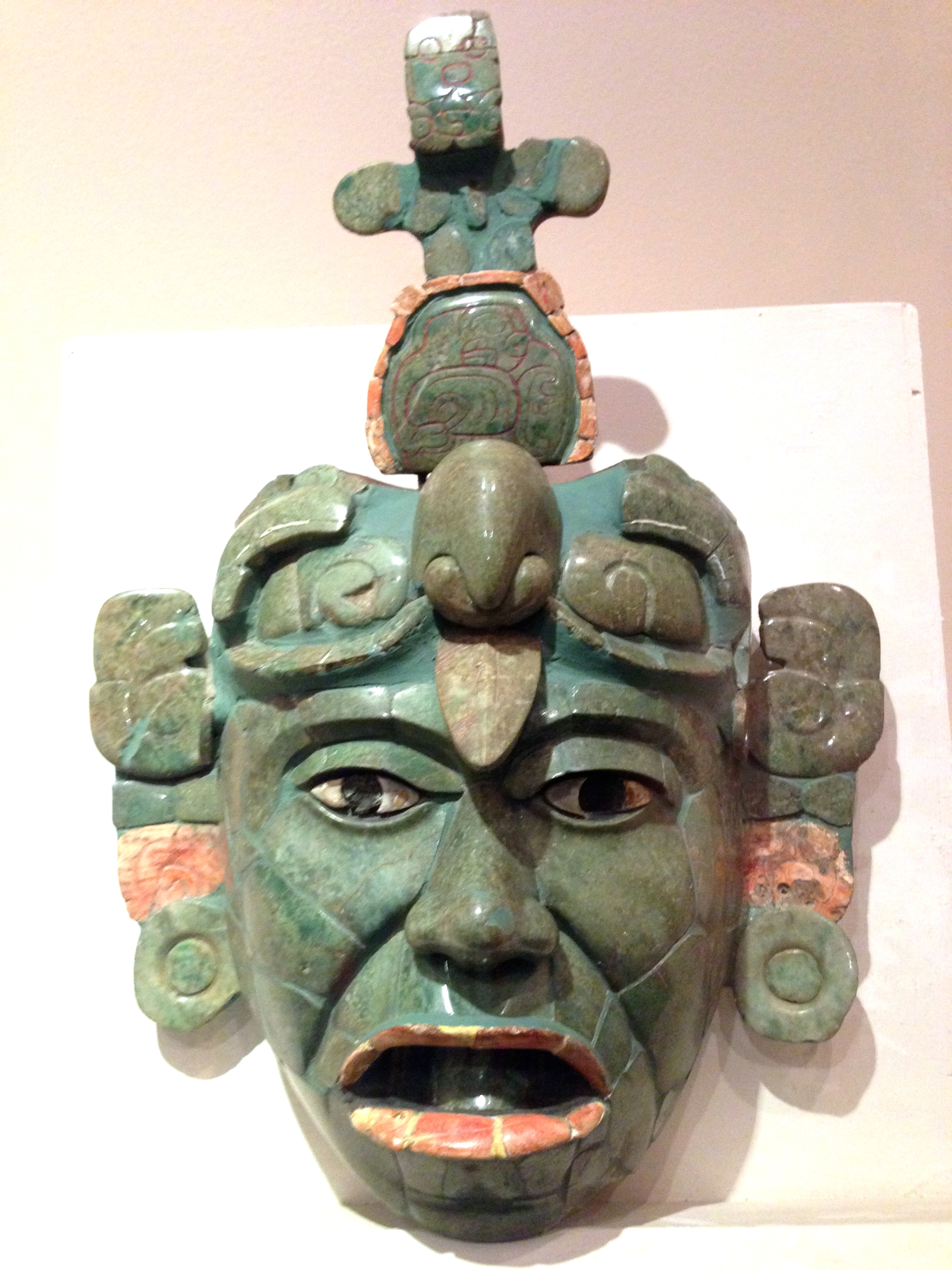
The back cover featuring the mask made of jade, pyrite, and shell, from Tikal. Early Classic period. Museo Nacional de Arqueología y Etnología, Guatemala.

As part of the Archéologie series in the "Découvertes Gallimard" collection, the authors recount in the book the rediscovery of Maya civilization, and the study of archaeological sites, objects and documents discovered in the region, from the beginning of the sixteenth century to the twentieth century.

According to the tradition of "Découvertes", which is based on an abundant pictorial documentation and a way of bringing together visual documents and texts, enhanced by printing on coated paper, as commented in L'Express, "genuine monographs, published like art books".

In the choice of pictorial documents, priority is given to originality and novelty, such as the original polychrome plates made by the English explorer Frederick Catherwood, about the "Maya Empire", were gathered for this book. It's almost like a "graphic novel", replete with colour plates.

== Contents ==
The book opens with a "trailer" (pp. 1–9), that is, a series of full-page archaeological photographs from Alfred Maudslay's Biologia Centrali-Americana, published between 1889 and 1902. The body text is divided into six chapters:

- Chapter I: "Conquistadors and Missionaries" (pp. 13–29);
- Chapter II: "Artists and Adventurers" (pp. 31–55);
- Chapter III: "The Age of the Scholars" (pp. 57–81);
- Chapter IV: "The Photographer-explorers" (pp. 83–99);
- Chapter V: "Symbols in Stone" (pp. 101–115);
- Chapter VI: "From Image to Reality" (pp. 117–127).

The second part of the book, the "Documents", containing a compilation of excerpts divided into five parts:

1. Insights of the First Travelers (pp. 130–135);
2. Explorers Rediscover a Lost World (pp. 136–145);
3. Cracking the Code (pp. 146–155);
4. The Quiché Maya's Book of Counsel (pp. 156–159);
5. Ancient Maya, Modern Maya (pp. 160–167).
- Further Reading (p. 168);
- List of Illustrations (pp. 169–172);
- Index (pp. 172–174).

== Reception ==
On Babelio, the book gets an average of 3.80/5 based on 22 ratings.

== Adaptation ==
In 2000, the book was adapted into a documentary film of the same name. A co-production between La Sept-Arte and Trans Europe Film, with the collaboration of Éditions Gallimard, the film was directed by Jean-Claude Lubtchansky, with voice-over narration by François Marthouret and Marc Zammit. The film was shot in Mexico and Guatemala, and broadcast on Arte as part of the television programme The Human Adventure. It has been dubbed into German under the title Stätten und Kultur der Maya, and subtitled into English and Spanish.

== See also ==
- Maya city
- Jean-Frédéric Waldeck
