= Steven Long =

American journalist, magazine publisher and author

- Born: Steven Hayward Long; July 17, 1944; Galveston, Texas, U.S.
- Died: April 23, 2022 (aged 77); Galveston, Texas, U.S.
- Occupations: Author, journalist, publisher
- Writing career
- Genres: Nonfiction, True crime, Novel
- Subjects: Animal welfare, murder
- Notable works: Every Woman's Nightmare; Out of Control; Death Without Dignity
- Notable awards: Gavel Award, State Bar of Texas
- Website: stevenlongwriter.com

Steven Hayward Long (July 17, 1944 – April 23, 2022), from Houston, Texas, was an American journalist, magazine publisher and author of three true crime books and one novel. He worked the three roles simultaneously, covering news events for magazines and newspapers while editing the monthly Horseback Magazine and researching books.

== Early years ==
Long was born in Galveston one of five children to a rice farmer and his wife. At 11 years old, he won his first journalism award with a merit badge from the Boy Scouts after his hometown paper published an article about his troop.

== Radio career ==
He began his journalism career as a radio reporter after attending Alvin Community College, Texas Lutheran College and Sam Houston State University. Working as a weekend reporter in the early 1960s for Galveston's KGBC, Long covered the arrival of President John F. Kennedy to Houston's Hobby Airport on the day before Kennedy's assassination the next day in Dallas. He also read the AP bulletin live announcing the shooting of Kennedy assassin Lee Harvey Oswald. Long spent four years at Galveston's KILE radio as an advertising sales associate while also reading the news and coordinating a weekly high school sports program during football season.

== Publisher ==
From 1977 until 1988, Long owned and published the Galveston alternative weekly newspaper In Between. Since 2004, he worked with his wife, Vicki, publishing the monthly Horseback Magazine, formerly titled Texas Horse Talk.

== Print and broadcast journalist ==
After closing the newspaper In Between in 1988, Long spent six years as a features writer for the Houston Chronicle and then as a freelancer covering high-profile Texas cases for national publications. While at the Chronicle, he wrote investigative reports, including exposing the dealings of the late Houston adoption attorney Leslie Thacker, who was convicted of buying and selling so-called drug-addicted crack babies in some Texas county jails. Long wrote a series of articles about the indictment and conviction of the head librarian at the University of Texas Medical Branch for stealing rare and historic medical texts, some dating to the 16th Century. Also while at the Chronicle, he contributed articles raising questions about the use of state prison inmates for training medical residents in cosmetic surgery.

As a freelance contract correspondent, Long was assigned by The New York Post to cover several high-profile Texas criminal cases as they unfolded in the late 1990s. They included the case of Andrea Yates, convicted for drowning her five children in 2001, and the investigation into the fall of Enron Corporation. He also covered the complex Enron-related trial of former accounting firm Arthur Andersen for Agence France Press and Crain's Chicago Business. His knowledge of the issues in these cases led to appearances as an interview subject on several television news magazine programs, including "Inside Edition," the CBS Early Show, "Catherine Crier Live"

Long appeared on E! Network's "Women Who Kill" series. He served as a consultant for the Dateline NBC series on its story about controversial New York City financier Robert Durst. He also served as a courtroom analyst and special correspondent with CNBC for its gavel-to-gavel coverage of the criminal trial of former Enron executives Ken Lay and Jeffrey Skilling, with TV appearances updating the case for CNBC's Squawk Box and Power Lunch programs as well as the NBC Nightly News with Brian Williams.

== True crime author ==
His first true crime book was released by Texas Monthly Press in 1987, which turned an investigation on nursing home irregularities into Death Without Dignity: The Story of the First Nursing Home Corporation Indicted for Murder. The book won a 1987 Gavel Award from the State Bar of Texas for distinguished journalism.

Out of Control, released in 2004 by St. Martin's Press True Crime Library, recounts the much-publicized story of Houston-area dentist Clara Harris, convicted in the 2002 murder of David Lynn Harris, her dentist husband, by running him down with her car outside a local hotel where she had caught him engaged in an extra-marital affair.

Every Woman's Nightmare: The Fairytale Marriage and Brutal Murder of Lori Hacking in 2006, published by St. Martin's Paperbacks, covers the Utah murder of housewife Lori Hacking, whose body was left in a city dump. The investigation ultimately led to charges against her husband, Mark, accused of murdering her while she slept because she had exposed his lies to her about acceptance into medical school. Long's book triggered opposition from members of the Church of Jesus Christ of Latter-day Saints.

He was a contributor to the now-closed online true crime blog In Cold Blog.

== Horses and journalism ==
As a crusader for horses who publicly opposed slaughter, Long appeared with his adopted horse, Facade, on the Animal Cops: Houston cable-TV series while also publishing Horseback Magazine and contributing articles to Western Horseman magazine. An article he wrote about the slaughter of healthy horses appeared in "New England Equine Rescues" publication.

He also was given an award from the American Quarter Horse Association for his 2003 article "Hoofbeats on Hollow Ground," published in Texas Parks and Wildlife magazine. Long also oversees development of Horseback Online, which includes a breaking-news page about the horse industry. Long also has served as vice president of the Texas State Horse Council.

He appeared in Saving America's Horse, a documentary about the controversial years'-long roundup of mustangs on federal land in the Southwest part of the country

In mid 2010, Long interviewed actor Tony Curtis, a horse lover whose wife Jill runs a horse rescue center, for an article in Cowboys & Indians magazine. It was Curtis's final interview before his September 29, 2010, death.

== Fiction ==
In 2012, Long released his first fact-based novel, Ruby's Passing, about a murder committed in 1955 in Dickinson, Texas.
