= Audrey Wood =

American children's book author (born 1948)

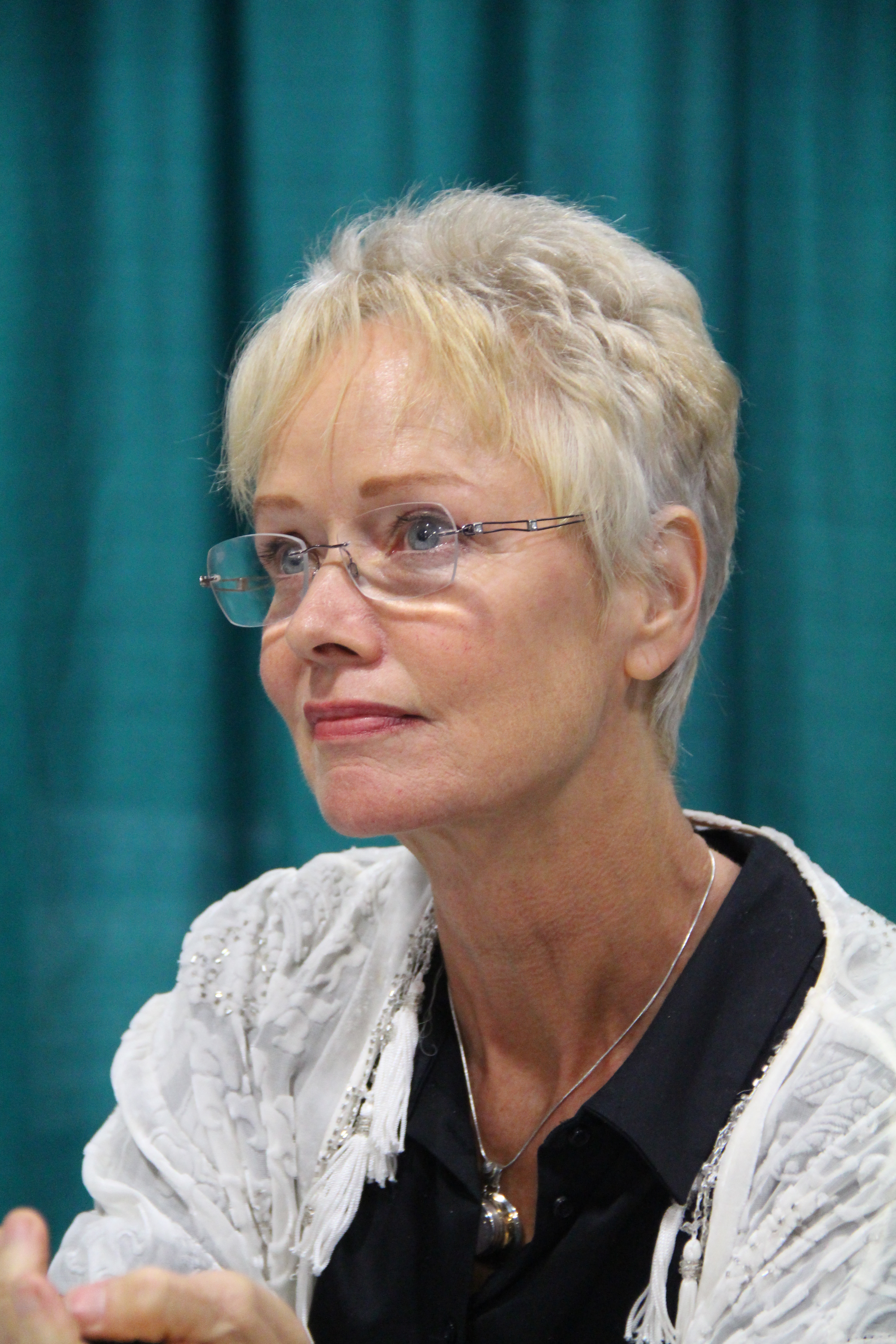
- Wood in 2015
- Born: Susan Brewer; August 12, 1948 (age 78)
- Occupation: Writer
- Spouse: Don Wood
- Children: Bruce Robert Wood
- Writing career
- Notable work: The Napping House
- Website: audreywood.com

Audrey Wood (born August 12, 1948) is an American children's author known for publishing more than 40 picture books, many with illustrations by her husband Don Wood, including the Caldecott Honor-winning King Bidgood's in the Bathtub (1985), Heckedy Peg (1987) and The Napping House (1984), which sold over 2.1 million copies worldwide as of 2015. The couple resides in Santa Barbara, California.

== Biography ==
Wood grew up in Little Rock, Arkansas, as the oldest of three girls, and wanted to be a children's book author since she was in the fourth grade. Her first memories of storytelling were in Sarasota, Florida, where her father was employed by Ringling Brothers Circus, commissioned to repaint the big top and sideshow murals. As Audrey became friends with the characters of the circus, she heard stories about them from the family of "little people" who lived next door to her family. Wood told stories to her little sisters, and used her parents' art books to make up stories about the paintings.

Wood uses children's literature to practice art, music, drama, dance, and writing. Her work creates a sense of imagination and excitement. She loves step-and-repeat stories for the "music of language". An example of this would be her famous book, The Napping House.

She met Don Wood, her future husband and collaborator, while they were students at the University of California, Santa Barbara. Seven years after they married, he began to illustrate her books after being disappointed by the appearance of her first book when it was published in England. They published their first collaboration, Moonflute, in 1980. Don Wood went on to illustrate close to 20 of her books, including King Bidgood's in the Bathtub, which received a Caldecott Honor in 1986. Audrey Wood credits the birth of their son, Bruce Robert Wood, for giving her increased motivation for her writing career. Bruce went on to become a fifth generation artist and another illustrator of her work.

== Personal life ==
Audrey Wood lives in Hawaii with her husband Don and their dogs and donkeys. Speaking about Don in an interview with the publisher Harcourt, Wood said "I read him a children's book during our honeymoon."

== Works ==
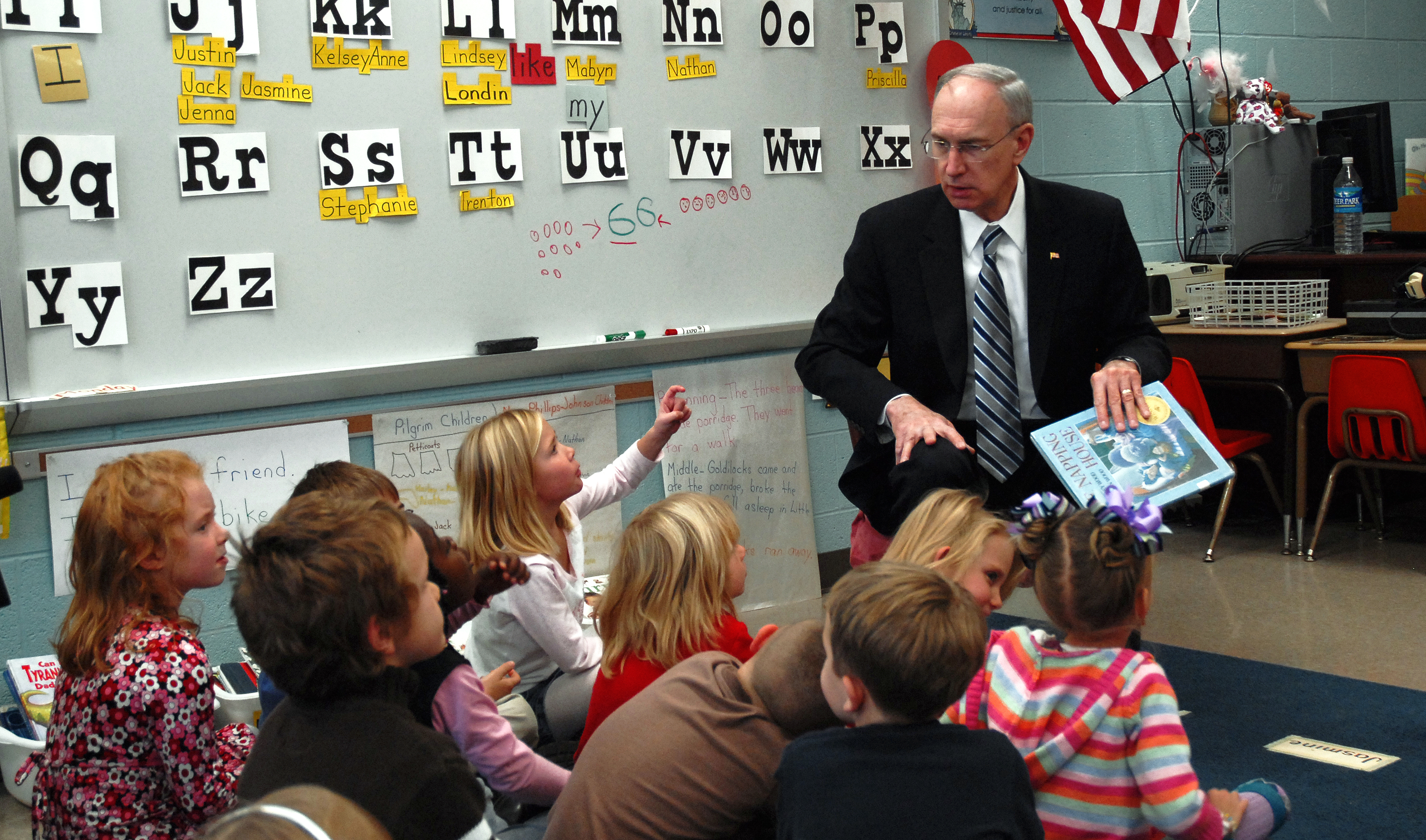
Deputy Secretary of Education Raymond Simon reads Audrey Wood's The Napping House to young students (2008)

- Alphabet Adventure (illustrated by Bruce Wood)
- Alphabet Mystery (illustrated by Bruce Wood)
- Alphabet Rescue (illustrated by Bruce Wood)
- Balloonia
- Birdsong (illustrated by Robert Florczak)
- The Birthday Queen (illustrated by Don and Audrey Wood)
- Blue Sky
- A Book for Honey Bear: Reading Keeps the Sighs Away (illustrated by Bruce Wood)
- Bright and Early Thursday Evening: A Tangled Tale (illustrated by Don Wood)
- The Bunyans (illustrated by David Shannon)
- The Deep Blue Sea (illustrated by Bruce Wood)
- Detective Valentine
- A Dog Needs a Bone!
- Elbert's Bad Word (illustrated by Don and Audrey Wood)
- The Flying Dragon Room (illustrated by Mark Teague)
- The Full Moon at the Napping House (illustrated by Don Wood)
- Heckedy Peg (illustrated by Don Wood)
- It's Duffy Time! (illustrated by Don Wood)
- Jubal's Wish (illustrated by Don Wood)
- King Bidgood's in the Bathtub (illustrated by Don Wood)
- The Little Mouse, The Red Ripe Strawberry, and The Big Hungry Bear (co-authored by Don Wood, illustrated by Don Wood)
- Little Penguin's Tale
- Magic Shoelaces
- Moonflute (illustrated by Don Wood)
- The Napping House (illustrated by Don Wood)
- Oh My Baby Bear
- Orlando's Little While Friends
- Piggies (co-authored by Don Wood, illustrated by Don Wood)
- Piggy Pie-Po (illustrated by Don Wood)
- Presto Change-O
- The Princess and the Dragon
- Quick as a Cricket (illustrated by Don Wood)
- The Rainbow Bridge (illustrated by Robert Florczak)
- The Red Racer
- Rude Giants
- Scaredy Cats
- Silly Sally
- Sweet Dream Pie (illustrated by Mark Teague)
- Ten Little Fish (illustrated by Bruce Wood)
- Three Sisters (illustrated by Rosekrans Hoffman)
- The Tickle-Octopus (illustrated by Don Wood)
- The Tooth Fairy
- Tugford Wanted to Be Bad
- Twenty-Four Robbers
- Weird Parents
- When the Root Children Wake Up (illustrated by Ned Bittinger)

=== Holiday books ===
- The Christmas Adventure of Space Elf Sam (illustrated by Bruce Wood)
- A Cowboy Christmas: The Miracle at Lone Pine Ridge (illustrated by Robert Florczak)
- The Horrible Holidays, illustrated by Rosekrans Hoffman
- Merry Christmas, Big Hungry Bear (illustrated by Don Wood)
