= Claude-François Baudez =

French Mayanist

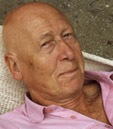
- Baudez in 2012
- Born: 3 December 1932; Paris, France
- Died: 13 July 2013 (aged 80)
- Occupation(s): Mayanist, archaeologist, iconologist
- Notable work: Lost Cities of the Maya

Claude-François Baudez (3 December 1932 – 13 July 2013) was a French Mayanist, archaeologist and iconologist. He was honorary director of research at the French National Centre for Scientific Research, a specialist on the rituals and beliefs of Mesoamerica, particularly of the Maya civilisation.

== Career ==
In his early years, Claude-François Baudez studied the little-known remains of Mesoamerican civilisations in Costa Rica and Honduras. Since 1971, he has devoted himself mainly to research on the Maya culture. He was co-director of French excavations at the Toniná archaeological site in Mexico, and led the Copán exploration and restoration programme, while studying its sculpture.

He is co-author of Le monde précolombien : Les Mayas, published in the collection “L’Univers des Formes” at Éditions Gallimard; and Les cités perdues des Mayas, a richly illustrated pocket book from the collection “Découvertes Gallimard”, which has been translated into twelve languages, including English.

== Research chronicle ==
- 1957-1960 Costa Rica: Investigations at the Papagayo site in the Valley of Tempisque.
- 1964-1965 Honduras: Investigations in the Gulf of Fonseca region and in the Valley of Comayagua.
- 1967-1969 Honduras: Excavation at the archaeological region Los Naranjos (in collaboration with Pierre Becquelin).
- 1971-1973 Mexico: Excavation at the Toniná site (in collaboration with Pierre Becquelin).
- 1977-1980 Honduras: Direction of the Copán Archaeological Project.
- 1981-1984 Honduras: Annual stays in Copán for in-situ study of its sculptures.
- 1989 Mexico: Stay in Palenque for in-situ studies of its sculptures.
- 1990 Costa Rica: Excavations at the Diquís Delta.
- 1994 Mexico: Iconographic studies at Balamku.

== Selected bibliography ==
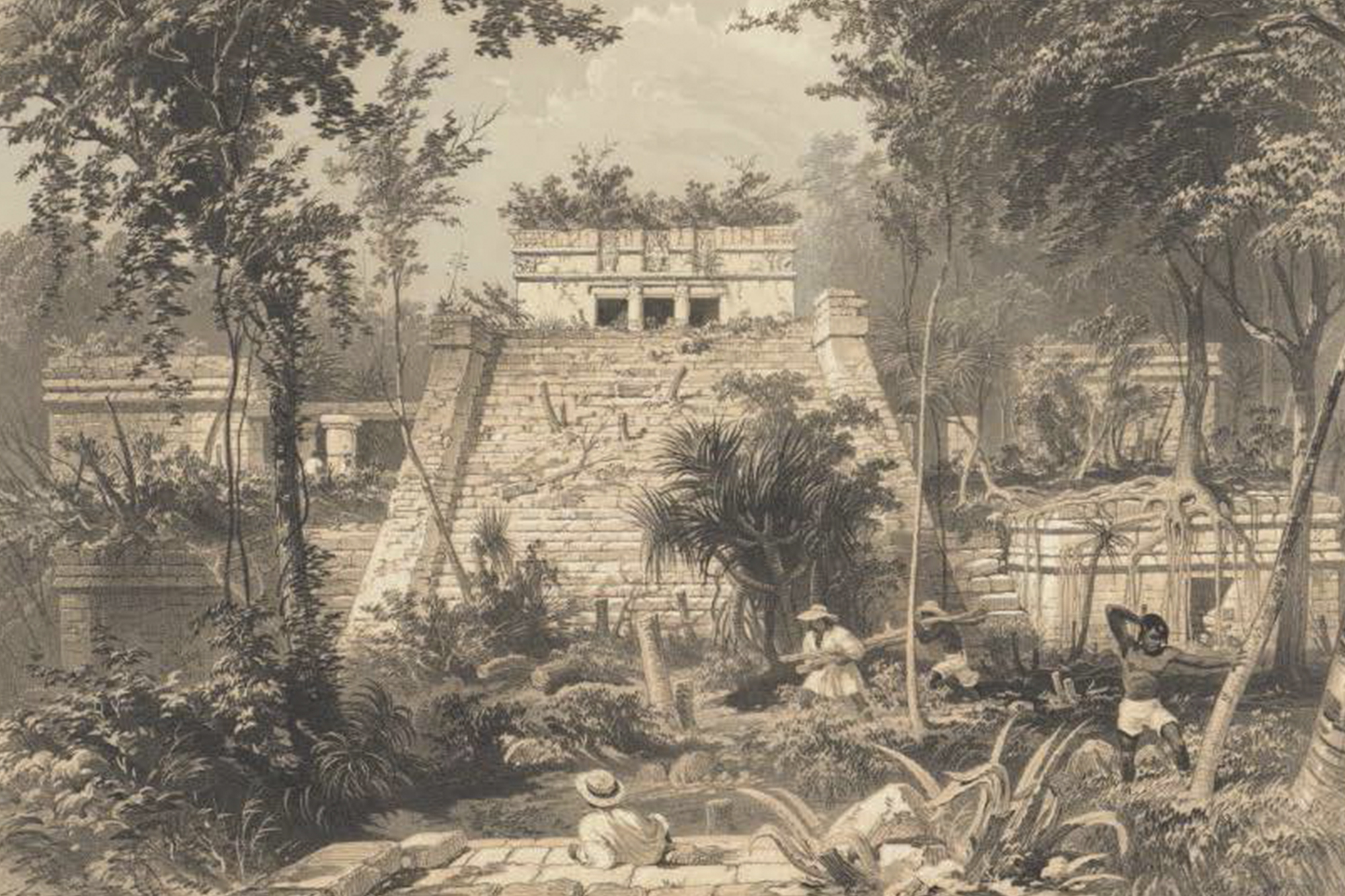
Main temple at Tulum, lithograph by Frederick Catherwood, featured on the cover of Lost Cities of the Maya.

- Recherches Archéologiques dans la vallée du Tempisque, Guanacaste, Costa Rica, Travaux et Mémoires de l’Institut des Hautes Études de l’Amérique Latine, 1967
- Amérique Centrale, collection « Archaeologia Mundi ». Nagel Publishers, 1970
- Co-author with Pierre Becquelin, Le monde précolombien : Les Mayas, collection « L’Univers des Formes » (nº 31). Éditions Gallimard, 1984
- Co-author with Sydney Picasso, Les cités perdues des Mayas, collection « Découvertes Gallimard » (nº 20), série Archéologie. Éditions Gallimard, 1987 (new edition in 2008)
  - US edition – Lost Cities of the Maya, “Abrams Discoveries” series. Harry N. Abrams, 1992
  - UK edition – Lost Cities of the Maya, ‘New Horizons’ series. Thames & Hudson, 1992
- Jean-Frédéric Waldeck, peintre : le premier explorateur des ruines mayas, Hazan, 1993
- Maya Sculpture of Copán: The Iconography, University of Oklahoma Press, 1994
- Une histoire de la religion des Mayas : Du panthéisme au panthéon, collection « Bibliothèque Albin Michel de l’histoire ». Éditions Albin Michel, 2002
- Una historia de la religión de los antiguos Mayas, UNAM, 2004
- Les Mayas, Paris, Les Belles Lettres, 2004 (collection « Guide Belles Lettres des civilisations »).
- La douleur rédemptrice. L'autosacrifice précolombien, Paris, Riveneuve éditions, 2012.
