= Larry Heinemann =

American novelist (1944–2019)

- Born: Larry Curtis Heinemann; January 18, 1944; Chicago, Illinois, US
- Died: December 11, 2019 (aged 75); Bryan, Texas, U.S.
- Occupations: Novelist, memoirist
- Writing career
- Period: 1977–2019
- Genre: War
- Subject: Vietnam War
- Notable awards: National Book Award; 1987

Larry Curtis Heinemann (January 18, 1944 – December 11, 2019) was an American novelist born and raised in Chicago. His published work – three novels and a memoir – is primarily concerned with the Vietnam War.

== Life ==
Heinemann served a combat tour as a conscripted draftee in the Vietnam War from 1967 to 1968 with the 25th Infantry Division, and described himself as the most ordinary of soldiers.

He received a B.A. from Columbia College, Chicago in 1971, taught creative writing there for fifteen years, and meanwhile wrote his own first and second novels. In 1986 he resigned over a furious argument about nepotism and academic freedom. Paco's Story was published later that year.

Afterward Heinemann received literature fellowships from the Guggenheim Foundation and the National Endowment for the Arts, and a Fulbright Scholarship to research Vietnamese folklore, legends, and mythology at Huế University. He also taught on the faculty of the University of Southern California in the Masters of Professional Writing Program. He worked as Texas A&M University's Writer in Residence until his retirement in 2015. He died December 11, 2019, of chronic obstructive pulmonary disease in Bryan, Texas.

== Writer ==
Heinemann's prose style is blunt and straightforward, reflecting his working-class background. He drew most directly on his Vietnam experience in his first novel Close Quarters which was published in 1977.

His second and critically most acclaimed novel is Paco's Story, which won the 1987 U.S. National Book Award for Fiction in a major surprise that has remained controversial, as Toni Morrison's novel Beloved was widely expected to win. Other critics and essayists thought the award appropriate and well deserved. At the time, Heinemann's only comment on the controversy was that the check for $10,000 was already cashed and the Louise Nevelson sculpture was not likely to be returned.

Paco's Story relates the postwar experiences of its protagonist, haunted by the ghosts of his dead comrades who provide the novel's distinctive narrative voice. (Ghost stories are common in both American and Vietnamese literature about the war.) The story deals with the seemingly contradictory and morally ambiguous role of the soldier as both victimizer and victim. Nhà xuất bản Phụ nữ (Women's Publishing House) of Hanoi published Paco's Story in December 2010, translated by Phạm Anh Tuấn, with an introduction by celebrated Vietnamese novelist Bảo Ninh, the first American-written war novel published in Vietnam.

His third novel, Cooler by the Lake (1992), is a comic story about Chicago. A petty thief gets into awful trouble when he attempts to return to its owner a wallet with eight $100 bills in it. Thematically lighter than his first novels, it was less positively received.

Heinemann's military experiences are documented in his book, Black Virgin Mountain (2005), a memoir. It chronicles his several returns to Vietnam and his personal and political views concerning the country and the war. He often referred to his two war novels and the memoir as an accidental trilogy.

Heinemann's short stories and non-fiction have appeared in Atlantic Monthly, GRAPHIS, Harper's, Penthouse, Playboy, and Tri-Quarterly magazines, as well as Van Nghe, the Vietnam Writers Association Journal of Arts and Letters in Ha Noi, and numerous anthologies including The Other Side of Heaven, Writing Between the Lines, Vietnam Anthology, Best of the Tri-Quarterly, Lesebuch der wilden Männer, The Vintage Book of War Stories, Veterans of War, Veterans of Peace (edited by Maxine Hong Kingston), and most recently in Humor Me, edited by Ian Frazier.

His work has been translated into Dutch, German, French, Spanish, and Vietnamese.
