= Mindy Aloff =

American editor, journalist, essayist, and dance critic

- Born: December 20, 1947 (age 78); Philadelphia
- Education: Vassar College; University at Buffalo; The State University of New York
- Occupations: Writer; Editor; Journalist
- Notable work: Night Lights; Hippo in a Tutu

Mindy Aloff (born December 1947 Philadelphia) is an American editor, journalist, essayist, and dance critic. Aloff's writing on dance, literature, film, and culture have appeared in the New York Times, The New Yorker, and other articles and publications worldwide.

== Life ==
She was educated at Philadelphia High School for Girls, and graduated from Vassar College, and University at Buffalo, The State University of New York with an M.A. She married the poet Martin Steven Cohen, in 1968; they have one daughter, Ariel Nikiya, (1985).

Her work has appeared in The New Yorker, The New York Times, The Nation, The New Republic, The Jewish Daily Forward, The Threepenny Review, and Voice of Dance. Since 2000, she has taught as an adjunct member of the Dance faculty at Barnard College.

== Awards ==
- 1987 Whiting Award
- 1990 Guggenheim Fellow
- Woodrow Wilson Fellow

== Works ==
- Night lights: poems. Prescott Street Press. 1979. ISBN 978-0-915986-13-2.
- Hippo in a Tutu: Dancing in Disney Animation. Disney Editions. 2009. ISBN 978-1-4231-0079-9.
- Mindy Aloff, ed. (2006). Dance anecdotes: stories from the worlds of ballet, Broadway, the ballroom, and modern dance. Oxford University Press. ISBN 978-0-19-505411-8.
