= Freightliners City Farm =

City farm in London, England

Coordinates: 51.5477°N 0.1115°W

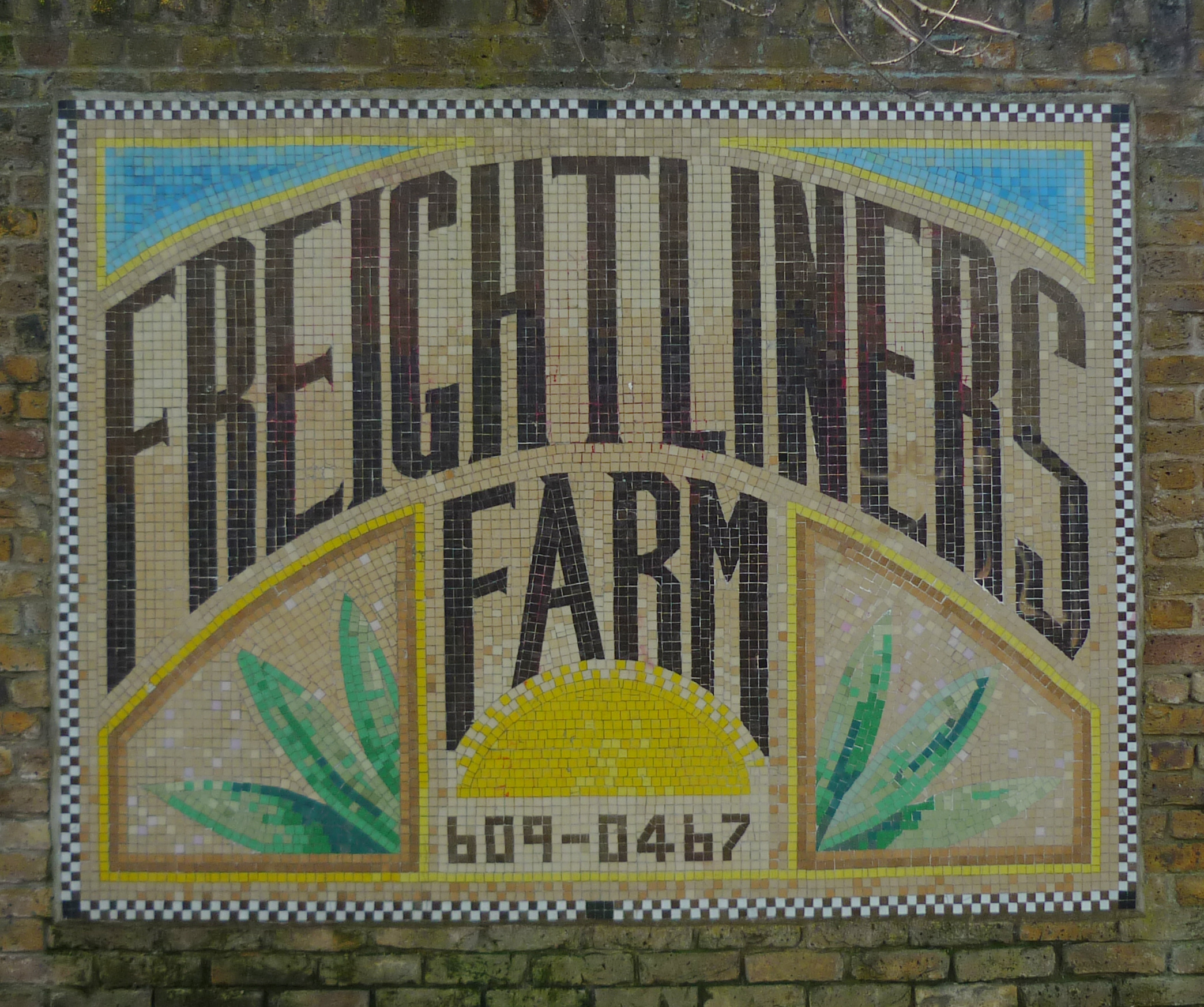
Farm mosaic

Freightliners City Farm is an urban farm located in Lower Holloway in the London Borough of Islington. It is the only urban farm in the borough.

The City Farm movement provides opportunities for young people in an urban environment to see and interact with creatures they would not otherwise see. Freightliners is a community-organised charity, receiving funding both from the council and donations.

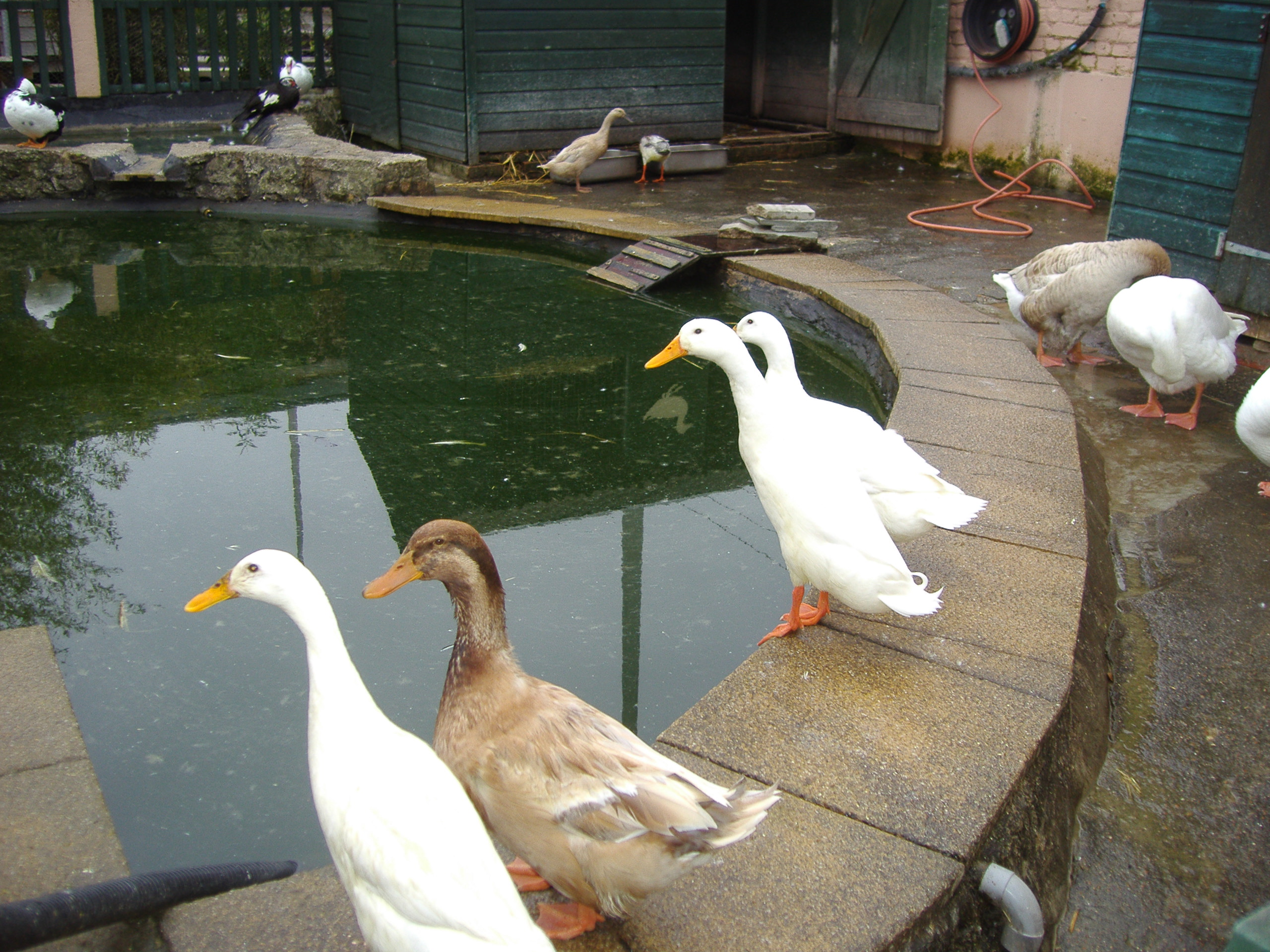
Geese at Freightliners Farm

The Freightliners City Farm was founded on a site in York Way, NW1 between King's Cross and Camden Town. The site was a goods yard formerly owned by Freightliners, the freight distribution branch of British Rail. The fourteen acre site had been acquired by Camden Council for eventual use for council housing. Building was not due to begin for several years and so in 1972 various community groups were given premises on the site. The site continued to be known to local users as 'Freightliners'. (The Maiden Lane Estate was eventually built on the site.)

Some workers were employed at the youth club, Freightliners Free School and pensioners club on the site. One of these workers, Sandy Wheeler, had grown up on her family's farm in Radnor, Wales and it was she who created the Freightliners Farm on the site. The Farm quickly proved popular with local children and expanded.

In 1978 the Freightliners site was ready to be developed for council housing and the Farm found a new permanent home at its present location in the neighbouring borough of Islington where purpose-built farm buildings were erected in 1988. The site is half a hectare.

There is an ornamental garden, vegetable, herb and fruit gardens on the site. There is also an animal village, where children can look at rabbits, and a farm shop and café.
