= Robert V. Bruce =

American historian

Robert Vance Bruce
- Born: December 19, 1923; Malden, Massachusetts, United States
- Died: January 15, 2008 (aged 84); Olympia, Washington
- Education: University of New Hampshire (B.S.); Boston University (M.A., PhD.)
- Awards: Guggenheim Fellow (1957); Huntington Library Fellow (1966); President of the Lincoln Group of Boston (1969–74); Fellow of the Society of American Historians (1974); R. Gerald McMurtry Lecturer on Abraham Lincoln (1981); Pulitzer Prize for History (1988); Fortenbaugh Lecturer at Gettysburg College (1989)
- Scientific career
- Fields: History (American Civil War)
- Workplaces: University of Bridgeport; Lawrence Academy at Groton; Boston University; University of Wisconsin

Robert Vance Bruce (December 19, 1923 in Malden, Massachusetts – January 15, 2008 in Olympia, Washington) was an American historian specializing in the American Civil War, who won the 1988 Pulitzer Prize for History for his book The Launching of Modern American Science, 1846–1876 (1987). After serving in the Army during World War II, Bruce graduated from the University of New Hampshire, where he earned his Bachelor of Science in mechanical engineering. He received his Master of Arts in history and his Doctor of Philosophy from Boston University, where he was later a professor. He also taught at the University of Bridgeport, Lawrence Academy at Groton, and the University of Wisconsin. Bruce was also a lecturer at the Fortenbaugh Lecture at Gettysburg College.

== Plagiarism controversy ==
In April 1998, Bruce accused Scottish historian James A. Mackay of plagiarizing his book Bell: Alexander Graham Bell and The Conquest of Solitude, even as Mackay acknowledged Bruce on page 12 of his book. Accusations also appeared in the review of Mackay's book by The Washington Post. By Bruce's own count, 285 pages of Mackay's 297-page book Alexander Graham Bell: A Life contained plagiarisms from his book, including Mackay's acknowledging the National Geographic Society and other organizations that had not heard of Mackay. Eventually, John Wiley & Sons took the book out of print and destroyed any remaining copies at Mackay's expense in exchange for Bruce's promise not to sue. Mackay also later apologized to Bruce. The American Historical Association later found that Mackay had violated its Statement on Standards of Professional Conduct.

== Bibliography ==
Bruce wrote multiple works:

- Lincoln and the Tools of War (1956) ISBN 978-0252060908
- 1877: Year of Violence (1959) ISBN 978-0929587059
- Two Roads to Plenty: An Analysis of American History (1964)
- Alexander Graham Bell and the Conquest of Solitude (1973) ISBN 9780316112512
- Alexander Graham Bell: Teacher of the Deaf (1974)
- Lincoln and the Riddle of Death (1981)
- The Launching of Modern American Science, 1846–1876 (1987) ISBN 9780394553948 (Pulitzer Prize for History winner)
- Bruce, Robert; Boritt, Gabor (1988). The Historian's Lincoln: Rebuttals: What the University Press Would Not Print. Gettysburg College. OCLC 21762068.
- The Shadow of A Coming War (1989)
- Lincoln, the War President: The Gettysburg Lectures (1992) (with Gabor Boritt) ISBN 9780195078916
