= Ungulani Ba Ka Khosa =

Mozambican writer

Francisco Esaú Cossa (pseudonym Ungulani Ba Ka Khosa, also spelled as Ungulani ba ka Khosa) is a Mozambican writer born on August 1, 1957, in Inhaminga, Sofala Province.

== Education and career ==
Khosa completed elementary school in Sofala, and high school in Zambezia. In Maputo he attended Eduardo Mondlane University, receiving a bachelor's degree in History and Geography. He then worked as a high school teacher.

In 1982, Khosa worked for the Ministry of Education for over a year. Six months after leaving the Ministry of Education, he was invited to work for the Writer's Association. He initiated his career as a writer with the publication of several short stories and was one of the founders of the magazine Charrua of the Associação dos Escritores Moçambicanos (AEMO). It was his experiences in Niassa and Cabo Delgado, where poorly organized reeducation camps were located, that gave him the urge to write and expose this reality.

== Literary influences ==
Khosa has described being influenced by Latin American writers, such as Alejo Carpentier, Julio Cortázar, Gabriel García Márquez, Juan Rulfo, Jorge Luis Borges and Mario Vargas Llosa, in addition to African writers, such as Ngũgĩ wa Thiong'o, Ousmane Sembène and Chinua Achebe, and American writers, such as Ernest Hemingway and William Faulkner.

== Awards and honors ==
- Won the Grand Prize of Mozambican Fiction in 1990 with Ualalapi
- In 2002 Ualalapi was considered one of the 100 best African books of the twentieth century.
- In 2007 Khosa won the José Craveirinha Award for his book Os Sobreviventes da Noite.

== Published works ==
- Ualalapi (1987). Trans. Richard Bartlett and Isaura de Oliveira (Tagus Press, 2017)
- Orgia dos loucos (1990). Orgy of the Fools
- Histórias de amor e espanto (1999). Stories of Love and Wonder
- No reino dos abutres (2002). In the Kingdom of Vultures
- Os sobreviventes da noite (2005). Survivors of the Night
- Choriro (2009)
- Entre as Memórias Silenciadas (2013). Among the Silenced Memories
- O Rei Mocho (2016)
- Orgia dos Loucos (2016)
- Cartas de Inhaminga (2017). Letters from Inhaminga
- Gungunhana (2018)
