= Glugging =

Phenomenon which occurs when a liquid is poured from a vessel with a narrow opening

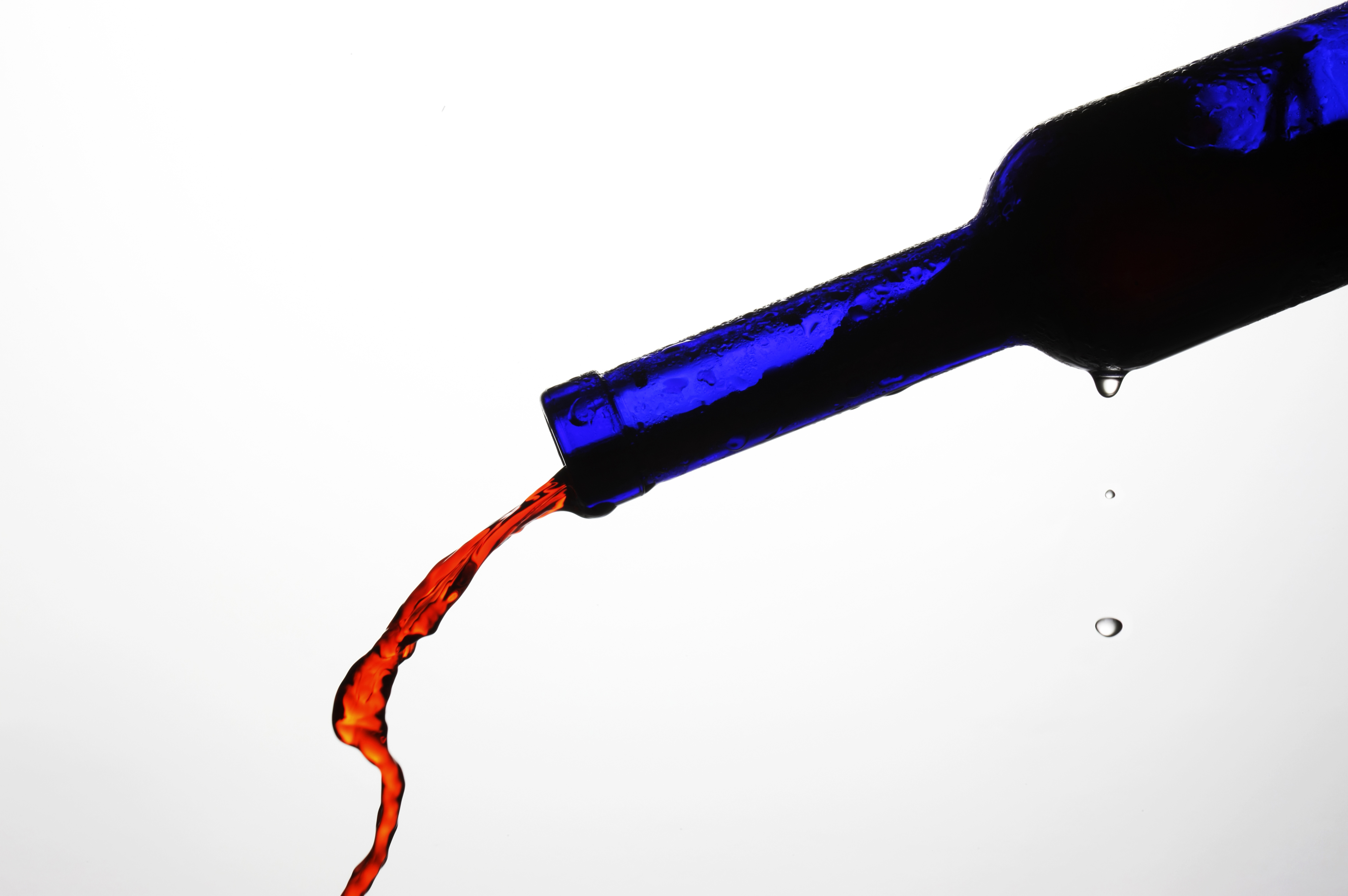
Wine exiting a blue bottle, with air being drawn into the neck, and the bubble of the previous glug to the top-right of the body

Uncorking and pouring
Uncorking, first pour, and re-corking of a 70cc bottle of Bourbon whiskey. During the pour, glugging can be heard.

Glugging (also referred to as "the glug-glug process") is the physical phenomenon which occurs when a liquid is poured rapidly from a vessel with a narrow opening, such as a bottle. It is a facet of fluid dynamics.

As liquid is poured from a bottle, the air pressure in the bottle is lowered, and air at higher pressure from outside the bottle is forced into the bottle, in the form of a bubble, impeding the flow of liquid. Once the bubble enters, more liquid escapes, and the process is repeated. The reciprocal action of glugging creates a rhythmic sound. The English word "glug" is onomatopoeic, describing this sound.

Academic papers have been written about the physics of glugging, and about the impact of glugging sounds on consumers' perception of products such as wine. Research into glugging has been done using high-speed photography.

Factors which affect glugging are the viscosity of the liquid, its carbonation, the size and shape of the container's neck and its opening (collectively referred to as "bottle geometry"), the angle at which the container is held, and the ratio of air to liquid in the bottle (which means that the rate and the sound of the glugging changes as the bottle empties).

== See also ==
- Cavitation – Low-pressure voids formed in liquids
- Water hammer – Pressure surge when a fluid is forced to stop or change direction suddenly
