= 2008–09 Swansea City A.F.C. season =

Swansea City
2008–09 season
- Chairman: Huw Jenkins
- Manager: Roberto Martínez
- Football League Championship: 8th
- FA Cup: Fifth round
- League Cup: Fourth round
- Top goalscorer: League: Jason Scotland (21); All: Jason Scotland (24)
- Highest home attendance: 18,053 vs Cardiff City (30 November 2008)
- Lowest home attendance: 11,442 vs Barnsley (9 December 2008)
Home colours	Away colours

The 2008–09 season was Swansea City A.F.C.'s first time in the second tier of English football for 24 years. Swansea gained promotion as champions of League One by 10 points.

== Squad statistics ==
=== Playing stats ===
Last updated on 10 March 2009

No.	Pos	Nat	Player	Total		Championship		FA Cup		League Cup	
No.	Pos	Nat	Player	Apps	Goals	Apps	Goals	Apps	Goals	Apps	Goals
1	GK	(Netherlands) NED	Dorus de Vries	46	0	40	0	3	0	3	0
2	DF	(Wales) WAL	Ashley Williams	51	2	46	2	4	0	1	0
3	DF	(Republic of Ireland) IRL	Marcos Painter	12	0	11	0	0	0	1	0
4	DF	(Wales) WAL	Kristian O'Leary	1	0	0	0	1	0	0	0
5	DF	(England) ENG	Alan Tate	31	1	21+4	1	4	0	2	0
6	MF	(Netherlands) NED	Ferrie Bodde	19	7	17	7	0	0	2	0
7	MF	(England) ENG	Leon Britton	49	0	43+1	0	4	0	1	0
8	MF	(Jamaica) JAM	Darren Pratley	38	4	32+4	4	1	0	1	0
9	FW	(Trinidad and Tobago) TRI	Jason Scotland	50	24	38+6	21	3	3	3	0
10	MF	(Spain) ESP	Andrea Orlandi	15	1	6+5	1	2	0	2	0
11	MF	(England) ENG	Mark Gower	39	0	30+4	0	3	0	2	0
14	MF	(Spain) ESP	Jordi Gómez	51	14	38+6	12	3	0	4	2
16	DF	(England) ENG	Garry Monk	46	1	40	1	3	0	3	0
17	MF	(Wales) WAL	Owain Tudur Jones	14	0	4+5	0	2	0	3	0
18	FW	(Spain) ESP	Gorka Pintado	46	7	10+31	5	2	1	3	1
19	MF	(Wales) WAL	Chris Jones	0	0	0	0	0	0	0	0
20	MF	(Wales) WAL	Shaun MacDonald	9	2	2+3	0	1	0	3	2
21	DF	(Argentina) ARG	Federico Bessone	16	0	13+2	0	0	0	1	0
22	DF	(Spain) ESP	Àngel Rangel	47	1	39+1	1	4	0	3	0
23	FW	(Spain) ESP	Guillem Bauzà	21	3	4+11	2	3	1	3	0
24	MF	(Wales) WAL	Joe Allen	26	1	17+6	1	2	0	1	0
25	MF	(Wales) WAL	Matthew Collins	4	0	2+1	0	0	0	1	0
26	DF	(Spain) ESP	Albert Serrán	18	0	10+3	0	2	0	3	0
28	MF	(Republic of Ireland) IRL	Thomas Butler	30	1	19+9	1	1	0	1	0
30	FW	(Wales) WAL	Chad Bond	0	0	0	0	0	0	0	0
31	MF	(England) ENG	Nathan Dyer	20	3	12+4	2	4	1	0	0

=== No longer at the club ===
No.	Pos	Nat	Player	Total		Championship		FA Cup		League Cup	
No.	Pos	Nat	Player	Apps	Goals	Apps	Goals	Apps	Goals	Apps	Goals
–	GK	(Greece) GRE	Dimitrios Konstantopoulos	6	0	4	0	1	0	1	0
–	GK	(Poland) POL	Artur Krysiak	2	0	2	0	0	0	0	0
–	DF	(Republic of Ireland) IRL	Stephen O'Halloran	3	0	2	0	0	0	1	0
–	FW	(England) ENG	Febian Brandy	18	0	14	0	0	0	4	0

=== Disciplinary record ===
- For games in the 2008–09 Championship.

No.	Nat.	Player	Yellow cards	Red cards
6	(Netherlands)	Ferrie Bodde	6	0
8	(Jamaica)	Darren Pratley	6	0
2	(Wales)	Ashley Williams	3	0
7	(England)	Leon Britton	9	1
14	(Spain)	Jordi Gómez	8	0
22	(Spain)	Àngel Rangel	6	0
18	(Spain)	Gorka Pintado	1	0
3	(Republic of Ireland)	Marcos Painter	2	0
21	(Argentina)	Federico Bessone	2	0
11	(England)	Mark Gower	1	0
9	(Trinidad and Tobago)	Jason Scotland	1	0
28	(Republic of Ireland)	Thomas Butler	2	1
16	(England)	Garry Monk	3	1
5	(England)	Alan Tate	4	0
26	(Spain)	Albert Serran	3	0
23	(Spain)	Guillem Bauzà	1	0
24	(Wales)	Joe Allen	4	0
31	(England)	Nathan Dyer	1	0
1	(Netherlands)	Dorus de Vries	1	0
20	(Wales)	Shaun MacDonald	1	0

- For games in the 2008–09 League Cup.

No.	Nat.	Player	Yellow cards	Red cards
14	(Spain)	Jordi Gómez	1	0
18	(Spain)	Gorka Pintado	1	0
17	(Wales)	Owain Tudur Jones	1	0
23	(Spain)	Guillem Bauzà	1	0
12	(England)	Febian Brandy	1	0

- For games in the 2008–09 FA Cup.

No.	Nat.	Player	Yellow cards	Red cards
8	(Jamaica)	Darren Pratley	1	0
5	(England)	Alan Tate	1	0
7	(England)	Leon Britton	1	0

== Awards ==
=== Manager of the Month ===
- January: (Spain) Roberto Martínez

=== Player of the Month ===
- February: (Trinidad and Tobago) Jason Scotland

=== Championship Team of the Week ===
The following Swansea players have been selected in the official Championship team of the week.

- 26 August 2008: (Spain) Àngel Rangel
- 6 October 2008: (Wales) Ashley Williams, (Trinidad and Tobago) Jason Scotland
- 27 October 2008: (Poland) Artur Krysiak, (Spain) Jordi Gómez
- 3 November 2008: (Greece) Dimitrios Konstantopoulos, (Spain) Jordi Gómez
- 1 December 2008: (England) Leon Britton
- 30 December 2008: (Jamaica) Darren Pratley
- 12 January 2009: (England) Garry Monk, (Trinidad and Tobago) Jason Scotland
- 19 January 2009: (Wales) Joe Allen
- 2 February 2009: (Spain) Jordi Gómez
- 9 February 2009: (Spain) Jordi Gómez, (Trinidad and Tobago) Jason Scotland
- 23 February 2009: (Spain) Jordi Gómez
- 6 April 2009: (England) Nathan Dyer
- 15 April 2009: (England) Leon Britton, (Wales) Ashley Williams, (Trinidad and Tobago) Jason Scotland
- 20 April 2009: (England) Garry Monk

== Player transfers ==
=== In ===
Date	Pos.	No.	Name	From	Fee	Source
22 May 2008	DF	2	(Wales) Ashley Williams	(England) Stockport County	£400,000
27 June 2008	MF	11	(England) Mark Gower	(England) Southend United	Free
6 June 2008	FW	18	(Spain) Gorka Pintado	(Spain) Granada	£100,000
28 June 2008	DF	21	(Argentina) Federico Bessone	(Spain) Espanyol	Free
1 July 2008	DF	25	(Spain) Albert Serrán	(Spain) Espanyol	£80,000
10 July 2008	FW	–	(England) Stefan Morrison	(England) West Bromwich Albion	Free

=== Out ===
Date	Pos.	No.	Name	To	Fee	Source
21 May 2008	MF	–	(England) Andy Robinson	(England) Leeds United	Free
5 June 2008	DF	–	(Trinidad and Tobago) Kevin Austin	(England) Chesterfield	Free
9 June 2008	DF	–	(England) Kevin Amankwaah	(England) Swindon Town	Free
3 July 2008	FW	–	(Scotland) Darryl Duffy	(England) Bristol Rovers	£100,000

=== Loans in ===
Date In	Date Left	Pos.	No.	Name	From	Source
6 June 2008	Season	MF	14	(Spain) Jordi Gómez	(Spain) Espanyol
22 July 2008	12 January 2009	FW	12	(England) Febian Brandy	(England) Manchester United
23 September 2008	22 December 2008	GK	–	(Poland) Artur Krysiak	(England) Birmingham City
27 October 2008	28 December 2008	GK	36	(Greece) Dimitrios Konstantopoulos	(England) Coventry City
5 November 2008	15 December 2008 (Injured – Loan ended)	DF	–	(Republic of Ireland) Stephen O'Halloran	(England) Aston Villa
2 January 2009	Season	MF	31	(England) Nathan Dyer	(England) Southampton
8 January 2009	31 January 2009	GK	36	(Greece) Dimitrios Konstantopoulos	(England) Coventry City

=== Loans out ===
Date Left	Date Back	Pos.	No.	Name	Loaned to	Source
31 December 2008	Season	DF	15	(Trinidad and Tobago) Dennis Lawrence	(England) Crewe Alexandra
August 2008	Season	MF	32	(Wales) Scott Evans	(Wales) Port Talbot Town
New Year	Season	FW	33	(Wales) Kerry Morgan	(Wales) Neath Athletic
August 2008	Season	DF	34	(Wales) Kyle Graves	(Wales) Neath Athletic
7 October 2008	23 October 2008 (Injured – Loan Ended)	MF	24	(Wales) Joe Allen	(Wales) Wrexham
27 January 2009	26 February 2009	MF	20	(Wales) Shaun MacDonald	(England) Yeovil Town

== Fixtures and results ==
=== Pre-season friendlies ===
- Swansea City scores given first

Game	Date	Venue	Opponents	Score	Scorers	Attendance	Report
1	9 July 2008	Away	(Sweden) Östersunds FK	6–0	Pintado 3', 22', 34', Bauzà 52', 70', Gower 64'	507	SCFC.co.uk
2	16 July 2008	Away	(Wales) Neath Athletic	5–0	Bauzà (2), Bodde (pen), Van der Heijden, Morrison	7,500	BBC Sport
3	17 July 2008	Neutral	(Wales) Port Talbot Town	4–0 (Dur:45 mins)	Pintado (3), Gower	1,000	SCFC.co.uk
4	17 July 2008	Neutral	(Wales) Carmarthen Town	3–0 (Dur:45 mins)	Bauzà (3)	1,000	SCFC.co.uk
5	25 July 2008	Neutral	(Spain) Espanyol	0–4		3,500	SCFC.co.uk
6	26 July 2008	Away	(Spain) Peralada	2–0	Butler 15', Bauzà 82'	500	SCFC.co.uk
7	27 July 2008	Away	(Spain) Palamós	1–0	Orlandi 47'	800	SCFC.co.uk
8	28 July 2008	Away	(Spain) Barcelona B	3–3	Bauzà 50', 58', Brandy 88'	1,500	SCFC.co.uk
9	31 July 2008	Away	(England) Chester City	3–2	Pratley, Morrison, Painter	889	BBC Sport
10	2 August 2008	Home	(England) West Bromwich Albion	0–0		5,996	SCFC.co.uk
11	5 August 2008	Home	(Netherlands) ADO Den Haag	1–0	Orlandi 67'	4,525	SCFC.co.uk

=== The Championship ===
The season finished on 3 May when Swansea City played Blackpool at the Liberty Stadium.

9 August 2008 FLC	Charlton Athletic	2–0	Swansea City	The Valley, London
	Hudson 9'; Gray 85'	Report		Attendance: 21,675; Referee: Richard Beeby

16 August 2008 FLC	Swansea City	3–1	Nottingham Forest	Liberty Stadium, Swansea
	Smith 9' (o.g.); Bodde 71'; Pintado 86'	Report	Perch 35'	Attendance: 16,611; Referee: Paul Taylor

23 August 2008 FLC	Plymouth Argyle	0–1	Swansea City	Home Park, Plymouth
		Report	Scotland 44'	Attendance: 9,203; Referee: Andy D'Urso

30 August 2008 FLC	Swansea City	1–1	Sheffield Wednesday	Liberty Stadium, Swansea
	Bodde 36'	Report	Watson 70'	Attendance: 16,702; Referee: Kevin Friend

13 September 2008 FLC	Crystal Palace	2–0	Swansea City	Selhurst Park, London
	Watson 28'; Carle 66'	Report		Attendance: 14,621; Referee: Lee Mason

16 September 2008 FLC	Swansea City	1–1	Derby County	Liberty Stadium, Swansea
	Williams 76'	Report	Pearson 63'	Attendance: 14,003; Referee: Andy Penn

20 September 2008 FLC	Swansea City	1–1	Burnley	Liberty Stadium, Swansea
	Bodde 90'	Report	Guðjónsson 59'	Attendance: 13,299; Referee: Andy Hall

27 September 2008 FLC	Reading	4–0	Swansea City	Madejski Stadium, Reading
	N. Hunt 19'; Doyle 26', 90'; S. Hunt 40'	Report		Attendance: 20,093; Referee: Scott Mathieson

30 September 2008 FLC	Preston North End	0–2	Swansea City	Deepdale, Preston
		Report	Bodde 19'; Gómez 80' (pen.)	Attendance: 10,558; Referee: Carl Boyeson

4 October 2008 FLC	Swansea City	3–1	Wolverhampton Wanderers	Liberty Stadium, Swansea
	Gómez 1'; Scotland 41', 57'	Report	Keogh 16'	Attendance: 17,556; Referee: Trevor Kettle

18 October 2008 FLC	Ipswich Town	2–2	Swansea City	Portman Road, Ipswich
	Counago 43', 82'	Report	Bodde 49'; Gómez 69'	Attendance: 20,026; Referee: Jon Moss

21 October 2008 FLC	Swansea City	0–0	Queens Park Rangers	Liberty Stadium, Swansea
		Report		Attendance: 13,475; Referee: Tony Bates

25 October 2008 FLC	Swansea City	3–0	Southampton	Liberty Stadium, Swansea
	Pratley 12'; Gómez 58'; Butler 72'	Report		Attendance: 15,564; Referee: Peter Walton

28 October 2008 FLC	Wolverhampton Wanderers	2–1	Swansea City	Molineux Stadium, Wolverhampton
	Ebanks-Blake 45', 57'	Report	Pratley 49'	Attendance: 21,988; Referee: Richard Beeby

1 November 2008 FLC	Doncaster Rovers	0–0	Swansea City	Keepmoat Stadium, Doncaster
		Report		Attendance: 9,534; Referee: Keith Stroud

9 November 2008 FLC	Swansea City	3–1	Watford	Liberty Stadium, Swansea
	Bodde 34'; Scotland 59'; Bauzà 90'	Report	Williamson 33'	Attendance: 13,891; Referee: Rob Shoebridge

15 November 2008 FLC	Norwich City	2–3	Swansea City	Carrow Road, Norwich
	Lupoli 28'; Rangel 61' (o.g.)	Report	Scotland 43'; Pratley 47'; Bodde 49'	Attendance: 24,262; Referee: Grant Hegley

21 November 2008 FLC	Swansea City	2–3	Birmingham City	Liberty Stadium, Swansea
	Gómez 2'; Ridgewell 45' (o.g.)	Report	Bent 42'; Phillips 74', 79'	Attendance: 16,956; Referee: Anthony Taylor

25 November 2008 FLC	Coventry City	1–1	Swansea City	Ricoh Arena, Coventry
	Fox 87'	Report	Gómez 67'	Attendance: 15,149; Referee: Mark Haywood

30 November 2008 FLC	Swansea City	2–2	Cardiff City	Liberty Stadium, Swansea
	Pratley 19'; Pintado 61'	Report	Ledley 45'; McCormack 48' (pen.)	Attendance: 18,056; Referee: Martin Atkinson

6 December 2008 FLC	Bristol City	0–0	Swansea City	Ashton Gate, Bristol
		Report		Attendance: 16,405; Referee: Lee Mason

9 December 2008 FLC	Swansea City	2–2	Barnsley	Oakwell, Barnsley
	Scotland 66', 90'	Report	Macken 49'; Campbell-Ryce 56' (pen.)	Attendance: 11,442; Referee: Graham Horwood

13 December 2008 FLC	Swansea City	1–1	Sheffield United	Liberty Stadium, Swansea
	Scotland 56' (pen.)	Report	Morgan 87'	Attendance: 14,744; Referee: Andre Marriner

20 December 2008 FLC	Blackpool	1–1	Swansea City	Bloomfield Road, Blackpool
	Gow 74'	Report	Scotland 67'	Attendance: 7,007; Referee: Darren Deadman

26 December 2008 FLC	Swansea City	0–0	Coventry City	Liberty Stadium, Swansea
		Report		Attendance: 17,603; Referee: Steve Tanner

28 December 2008 FLC	Birmingham City	0–0	Swansea City	St Andrew's, Birmingham
		Report		Attendance: 21,836; Referee: Mike Riley

10 January 2009 FLC	Burnley	0–2	Swansea City	Turf Moor, Burnley
		Report	Scotland 35' (pen.), 86'	Attendance: 13,740; Referee: Michael Oliver

17 January 2009 FLC	Swansea City	2–0	Reading	Liberty Stadium, Swansea
	Scotland 45'; Orlandi 89'	Report		Attendance: 15,197; Referee: Fred Graham

27 January 2009 FLC	Swansea City	4–1	Preston North End	Liberty Stadium, Swansea
	Gómez 2'; Scotland 29'; Bauzà 69'; Tate 87'	Report	Brown 90'	Attendance: 14,774; Referee: P. Gibbs

31 January 2009 FLC	Southampton	2–2	Swansea City	St Mary's Stadium, Southampton
	Saganowski 17' 76'	Report	Gómez 33'; Pintado 65'	Attendance: 17,623; Referee: Steve Tanner

7 February 2009 FLC	Swansea City	3–0	Ipswich Town	Liberty Stadium, Swansea
	Scotland 3', 73'; Gómez 86'	Report		Attendance: 14,020; Referee: Kevin Wright

17 February 2009 FLC	Watford	2–0	Swansea City	Vicarage Road, Watford
	Priskin 23'; Smith 33'	Report		Attendance: 13,727; Referee: Anthony Taylor

21 February 2009 FLC	Swansea City	3–1	Doncaster Rovers	Liberty Stadium, Swansea
	Scotland 28' (pen.); Gómez 71', 90'	Report	Coppinger 11'	Attendance: 16,161; Referee: Scott Mathieson

28 February 2009 FLC	Swansea City	1–1	Charlton Athletic	Liberty Stadium, Swansea
	Dyer 42'	Report	Bailey 55'	Attendance: 15,053; Referee: Keith Stroud

3 March 2009 FLC	Derby County	2–2	Swansea City	Pride Park Stadium, Derby
	Porter 14', 48'	Report	Rangel 55'; Pintado 87'	Attendance: 26,691; Referee: Phil Crossley

7 March 2009 FLC	Nottingham Forest	1–1	Swansea City	City Ground, Nottingham
	McGugan 76'	Report	Scotland 61'	Attendance: 20,475; Referee: Jon Moss

10 March 2009 FLC	Swansea City	1–0	Plymouth Argyle	Liberty Stadium, Swansea
	Scotland 78' (pen.)	Report		Attendance: 13,103; Referee: Iain Williamson

14 March 2009 FLC	Swansea City	1–3	Crystal Palace	Liberty Stadium, Swansea
	Pintado 66'	Report	Moses 49'; Fonte 61'; Kuqi 90'	Attendance: 13,663; Referee: Roger East

17 March 2009 FLC	Queens Park Rangers	1–0	Swansea City	Loftus Road, London
	Leigertwood 30'	Report		Attendance: 12,288; Referee: Graham Horwood

21 March 2009 FLC	Sheffield Wednesday	0–0	Swansea City	Hillsborough Stadium, Sheffield
		Report		Attendance: 22,564; Referee: Mike Jones

5 April 2009 FLC	Cardiff City	2–2	Swansea City	Ninian Park, Cardiff
	Chopra 54'; McCormack 90' (pen.)	Report	Dyer 11'; Allen 88'	Attendance: 20,156; Referee: Mike Dean

11 April 2009 FLC	Swansea City	2–1	Norwich City	Liberty Stadium, Swansea
	Scotland 29', 50' (pen.)	Report	Lee 33'	Attendance: 15,783; Referee: Graham Salisbury

13 April 2009 FLC	Barnsley	1–3	Swansea City	Oakwell, Barnsley
	Bogdanović 84' (pen.)	Report	Williams 2'; Gómez 36'; Scotland 67'	Attendance: 11,788; Referee: David Foster

18 April 2009 FLC	Swansea City	1–0	Bristol City	Liberty Stadium, Swansea
	Monk 25'	Report		Attendance: 15,327; Referee: Lee Mason

25 April 2009 FLC	Sheffield United	1–0	Swansea City	Bramall Lane, Sheffield
	Cotterill 37' (pen.)	Report		Attendance: 28,010; Referee: Rob Styles

3 May 2009 FLC	Swansea City	0–1	Blackpool	Liberty Stadium, Swansea
		Report	Campbell 13'	Attendance: 16,316; Referee: Carl Boyeson

==== Results by round ====
Round	1	2	3	4	5	6	7	8	9	10	11	12	13	14	15	16	17	18	19	20	21	22	23	24	25	26	27	28	29	30	31	32	33	34	35	36	37	38	39	40	41	42	43	44	45	46
Ground	A	H	A	H	A	H	H	A	A	H	A	H	H	A	A	H	H	H	A	H	A	H	H	A	H	A	A	H	H	A	H	A	H	H	A	A	H	H	A	A	A	H	A	H	A	H
Result	L	W	W	D	L	D	D	L	W	W	D	D	W	L	D	W	W	L	D	D	D	D	D	D	D	D	W	W	W	D	W	L	W	D	D	D	W	L	L	D	D	W	W	W	L	L

A = Away; H = Home; W = Win; D = Draw; L = Loss

=== The FA Cup ===
13 January 2009 Round 3	Histon	1–2	Swansea City	Bridge Road, Impington
	Simpson 84'	Report	Pintado 22'; Bauzà 38'	Attendance: 2,821; Referee: Phil Crossley

24 January 2009 Round 4	Portsmouth	0–2	Swansea City	Fratton Park, Portsmouth
		Report	Dyer 26'; Scotland 45' (pen.)	Attendance: 17,357; Referee: Andre Marriner

14 February 2009 Round 5	Swansea City	1–1	Fulham	Liberty Stadium, Swansea
	Scotland 52'	Report	Monk 44' (o.g.)	Attendance: 16,573; Referee: Howard Webb

24 February 2009 replay	Fulham	2–1	Swansea City	Craven Cottage, London
	Dempsey 77'; Zamora 80'	Report	Scotland 47'	Attendance: 12,316; Referee: Mark Halsey

=== League Cup ===
Swansea reached the fourth round of the League Cup before losing to Championship strugglers Watford.

12 August 2008 Round 1	Swansea City	2–0	Brentford	Liberty Stadium, Swansea
	MacDonald 31', 69'	Report		Attendance: 5,366; Referee: Steve Bratt

26 August 2008 Round 2	Swansea City	2–1 (a.e.t.)	Hull City	Liberty Stadium, Swansea
	Pintado 63'; Gómez 105' (pen.)	Report	Windass 11'	Attendance: 8,622; Referee: Mike Russell

23 September 2008 Round 3	Swansea City	1–0	Cardiff City	Liberty Stadium, Swansea
	Gómez 57'	Report		Attendance: 17,411; Referee: Alan Wiley

11 November 2008 Round 4	Swansea City	0–1	Watford	Liberty Stadium, Swansea
		Report	Williamson 21'	Attendance: 9,549; Referee: Andy D'Urso
