= 2007–08 Swansea City A.F.C. season =

Swansea City
2007–08 season
- Chairman: Huw Jenkins
- Manager: Roberto Martínez
- Stadium: Liberty Stadium
- League One: 1st (promoted to the Football League Championship)
- FA Cup: Third round
- League Cup: Second round
- Football League Trophy: Area finals
- Top goalscorer: League: Jason Scotland (24); All: Jason Scotland (29)

During the 2007–08 English football season, Swansea City competed in Football League One.

== Season summary ==
Swansea finished the season as champions of League One, ten points ahead of runners-up Nottingham Forest. Swansea had flirted with the top six for the first third of the season, before a run of six straight wins lifted them to first place, which they did not relinquish for the rest of the season. This winning sequence was the start of eighteen straight matches without defeat. The club also enjoyed good form in the Football League Trophy, reaching the Southern finals before being knocked out by Milton Keynes Dons in a penalty shootout.

== Squad ==
Squad at end of season

Note: Flags indicate national team as defined under FIFA eligibility rules; some limited exceptions apply. Players may hold more than one non-FIFA nationality.

No.	Pos.	Nation	Player
2	DF	ENG	Kevin Amankwaah
3	DF	TRI	Kevin Austin (Note: Austin was born in Hackney, England, but also qualified to represent Trinidad and Tobago internationally and made his international debut for Trinidad and Tobago in 2000.)
4	DF	WAL	Kristian O'Leary
5	DF	ENG	Alan Tate
6	MF	NED	Ferrie Bodde
7	MF	ENG	Leon Britton
8	MF	ENG	Darren Pratley
9	FW	TRI	Jason Scotland
10	MF	ESP	Andrea Orlandi
11	FW	SCO	Darryl Duffy
14	DF	IRL	Marcos Painter (Note: Painter was born in Solihull, England, but also qualified to represent the Republic of Ireland internationally and has represented them at U-21 level.)
15	DF	TRI	Dennis Lawrence
16	DF	ENG	Garry Monk

No.	Pos.	Nation	Player
17	MF	WAL	Owain Tudur Jones
18	MF	ENG	Andy Robinson
20	MF	WAL	Shaun MacDonald
21	GK	NED	Dorus de Vries
22	DF	ESP	Àngel Rangel
23	FW	ESP	Guillem Bauzà
24	MF	ENG	Darren Way
26	MF	ENG	Paul Anderson (on loan from Liverpool)
28	MF	IRL	Thomas Butler
29	MF	ENG	Febian Brandy (on loan from Manchester United)
30	GK	ENG	David Knight
32	MF	WAL	Joe Allen
36	DF	WAL	Ashley Williams (Note: Williams was born in Wolverhampton, England, but also qualified to represent Wales internationally and made his international debut for Wales in March 2008.) (on loan from Stockport County)

=== Left club during season ===
Note: Flags indicate national team as defined under FIFA eligibility rules; some limited exceptions apply. Players may hold more than one non-FIFA nationality.

No.	Pos.	Nation	Player
12	DF	SCO	Steven Watt (on loan to Inverness Caledonian Thistle)
29	MF	ENG	Ian Craney (to Accrington Stanley)

No.	Pos.	Nation	Player
35	FW	NIR	Warren Feeney (on loan to Cardiff City)

== Reserve squad ==
Note: Flags indicate national team as defined under FIFA eligibility rules; some limited exceptions apply. Players may hold more than one non-FIFA nationality.

No.	Pos.	Nation	Player
19	MF	WAL	Chris Jones
25	MF	WAL	Matthew Collins
27	DF	ENG	Kyle Graves
31	MF	WAL	Scott Evans

No.	Pos.	Nation	Player
33	FW	WAL	Kerry Morgan
34	GK	WAL	Callum Hawthorne
35	DF	ENG	James Burgin
