= Àngel Rangel =

Spanish footballer (born 1982)

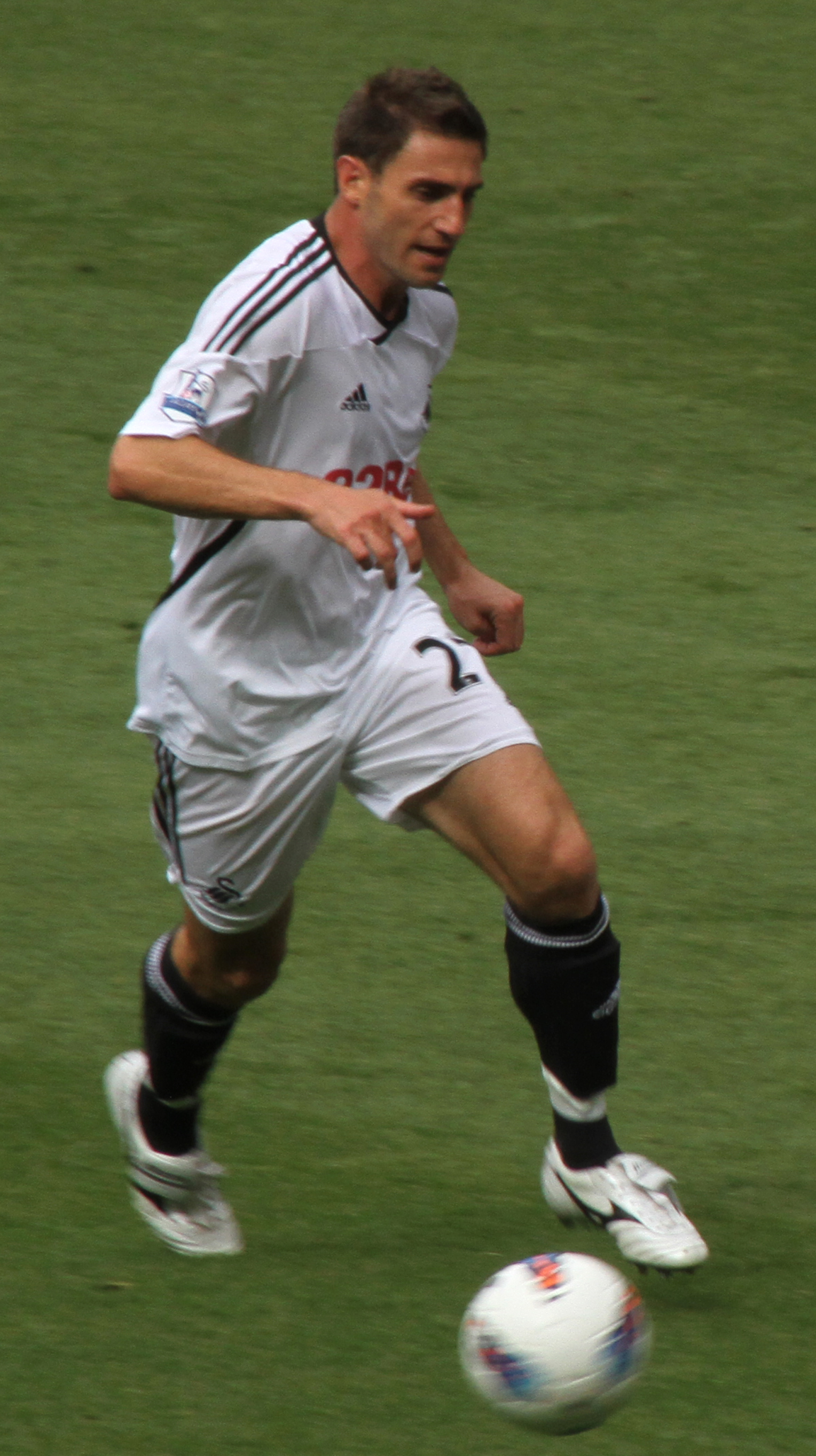
- Rangel playing for Swansea in 2011

Personal information
- Full name: Àngel Rangel Zaragoza
- Date of birth: 28 November 1982 (age 43)
- Place of birth: Sant Carles de la Ràpita, Spain
- Height: 1.78 m (5 ft 10 in)
- Position: Right-back

Youth career
- 1991–1998: Rapitenca
- 1998–2001: Gimnàstic

Senior career*
Years	Team	Apps	(Gls)
2001–2003	Tortosa		
2003–2004	Reus		
2004–2005	Girona	24	(0)
2005–2006	Sant Andreu	33	(5)
2006–2007	Terrassa	34	(2)
2007–2018	Swansea City	328	(9)
2018–2020	Queens Park Rangers	41	(2)
Total		460+	(18+)
- * Club domestic league appearances and goals

Àngel Rangel Zaragoza (Catalan pronunciation: [ˈaɲʒəl rəɲˈʒɛl]; born 28 November 1982) is a Spanish former professional footballer who played as a right-back.

After playing lower league football in his native country for six years, he went on to spend most of his 19-year career with Swansea City, winning promotion to the Premier League in 2011 and appearing in 374 competitive matches.

Rangel signed for Queens Park Rangers in 2018, and retired from playing two years later. Subsequently, he worked as a manager in Pontardawe Town's youth system.

== Club career ==
=== Swansea City ===
Born in Sant Carles de la Ràpita, Tarragona, Catalonia, Rangel represented CD Tortosa, CF Reus Deportiu, Girona FC, UE Sant Andreu and Terrassa FC in his homeland, never in higher than the Segunda División B. In summer 2007, he joined Swansea City in the English League One on a one-year performance-related deal, as countryman Roberto Martínez was the manager. The latter was in attendance of a match between Terrassa and Benidorm CF to scout striker Jorge Molina, but Rangel's performance in the 3–3 draw convinced Martínez to sign him; Terrassa demanded €15,000 for him but the Welsh club was only willing to spend €5,000, and the player paid the remaining €10,000 himself.

Rangel played a massive role in his first season as the Swans returned to the Championship after a 24-year absence, as league champions. He scored his first goal for them on 27 November 2007, netting eight minutes from time in a 1–0 home win against Hartlepool United. Two weeks later, again at the Liberty Stadium, he netted in a 3–0 victory over Southend United. In April 2008, he was one of five team players to make the PFA League One Team of the Year alongside Ferrie Bodde, Garry Monk, Andy Robinson and the league's top scorer Jason Scotland.

On 5 September 2008, Rangel signed a new contract until June 2010. He continued to feature prominently in the following years and, in mid-February 2010, agreed to an extension until June 2011.

The 2010–11 campaign was a successful one for both Swansea and Rangel, as the former were promoted to the Premier League for the first time in their history following a 4–2 defeat of Reading in the play-off final at Wembley Stadium. In spite of missing several weeks early on with a thigh muscle tear, he contributed to the feat with two goals from 41 appearances, scoring at Doncaster Rovers in a 1–1 draw and at home to Millwall which also ended in a 1–1 draw. In late June 2011, he put pen to paper to a new three-year deal.

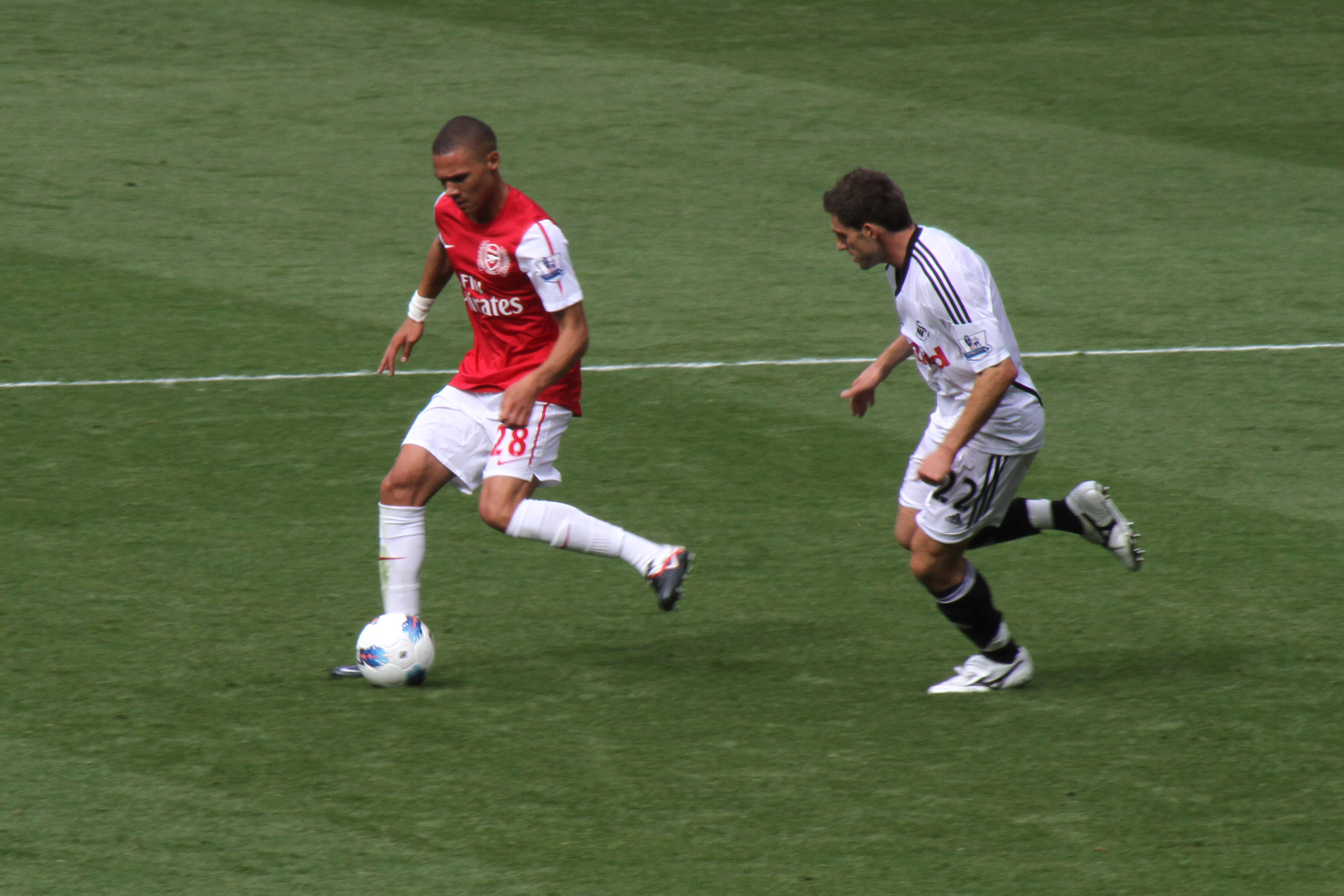
Rangel defending against Kieran Gibbs of Arsenal in September 2011

In November 2011, Rangel was voted best defender in the Premier League. He played 34 matches during the season, helping the team retain their league status.

Rangel scored his first goal in the English top flight on 25 August 2012, in a 3–0 home win over West Ham United. On 8 March 2013, he signed a new contract with Swansea, keeping him at the club until 2016.

On 19 April 2015, one month after again extending his link, now until 2017, Rangel was selected in The Football Manager Team of the Decade at the Football League Awards. On 14 November 2017, he was named new captain after Leon Britton stepped down to become a player-assistant manager.

Rangel was released at the end of the 2017–18 campaign.

=== Queens Park Rangers ===
Rangel spent time in the 2018 off-season training with Indian Super League club Bengaluru FC during their tour of Valencia. On 15 August, he joined Championship side Queens Park Rangers on a one-year contract.

On 14 August 2020, Rangel left Loftus Road, remaining there to be assisted through his rehabilitation from an Achilles tendon injury. The following 20 April, however, the 38-year-old announced his retirement.

In April 2022, Rangel was appointed manager of Pontardawe Town's under-12 team, where his son, also named Àngel, was playing.

== International career ==
Rangel was believed to qualify to represent Wales on residency grounds, but was ruled ineligible in July 2012 as he had not had five years of continuous education in the country.

== Personal life ==
On 18 January 2013, Rangel drove around Swansea with his wife Nikki to distribute food to the homeless. He told CNN: "We went for something to eat in a local sandwich chain and overheard the manager saying they had to throw out food as they were about to close for the night. My wife, Nikki, who is a very caring and charitable person, asked if we could have them for the homeless rather than see them thrown in the bin. They agreed and we drove around Swansea for over an hour, but couldn't find any homeless people as it was so cold out on the streets with all the snow. We decided to tweet a plea and we were guided to a local charity shelter who looked after the homeless." He was so pleased with the reaction to his gesture he confirmed that he would be helping out again.

On 5 April 2013, Rangel announced plans to hold charity auctions with his wife and teammates Chico Flores, Ben Davies, Jonathan de Guzmán, Pablo Hernández, Michu and Itay Shechter, to raise money for the Severn Hospice in Telford, Maggie's Cancer Centre in Swansea and The Christian Lewis Trust Kids Cancer Charity; among the top prizes on offer at one of the auctions were Rangel's personal box for the game against Manchester City, and a visit to a Formula One garage during qualifying of the German Grand Prix. He was inspired to do this by Nikki, who has had three family members diagnosed with cancer.

== Career statistics ==
Appearances and goals by club, season and competition
Club	Season	League			Cup		Other		Total	
Club	Season	Division	Apps	Goals	Apps	Goals	Apps	Goals	Apps	Goals
Girona	2004–05	Segunda División B	24	0	1	0	—		25	0
Sant Andreu	2005–06	Segunda División B	33	5	0	0	—		33	5
Terrassa	2006–07	Segunda División B	34	2	1	0	—		35	2
Swansea City	2007–08	League One	43	2	5	0	4 (Note: Appearances in Football League Trophy)	0	52	2
Swansea City	2008–09	Championship	40	1	6	0	—		46	1
Swansea City	2009–10	Championship	38	0	2	0	—		40	0
Swansea City	2010–11	Championship	38	2	2	0	3 (Note: Appearances in Football League play-offs)	0	43	2
Swansea City	2011–12	Premier League	34	0	1	1	—		35	1
Swansea City	2012–13	Premier League	33	3	4	0	—		37	3
Swansea City	2013–14	Premier League	30	0	0	0	9 (Note: Appearances in UEFA Europa League)	0	39	0
Swansea City	2014–15	Premier League	27	0	2	0	0	0	29	0
Swansea City	2015–16	Premier League	23	0	2	0	0	0	25	0
Swansea City	2016–17	Premier League	18	1	3	0	0	0	21	1
Swansea City	2017–18	Premier League	4	0	3	0	—		7	0
Swansea City	Total		328	9	30	1	16	0	374	10
Queen's Park Rangers	2018–19	Championship	20	2	0	0	—		20	2
Queen's Park Rangers	2019–20	Championship	21	0	0	0	—		21	0
Queen's Park Rangers	Total		41	2	0	0	0	0	41	2
Career total			460	18	32	1	16	0	508	19

== Honours ==
Swansea City

- Football League Cup: 2012–13
- Football League Championship play-offs: 2011
- Football League One: 2007–08

Individual

- PFA Team of the Year: 2007–08 League One
- Football League Team of the Decade
