= Garry Monk =

English footballer and manager (born 1979)

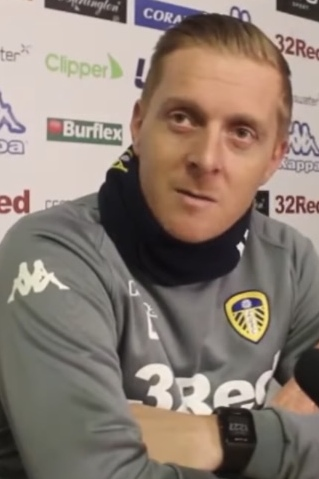
- Monk with Leeds United in 2017

Personal information
- Full name: Garry Alan Monk
- Date of birth: 6 March 1979 (age 47)
- Place of birth: Bedford, England
- Height: 6 ft 0 in (1.83 m)
- Position: Centre back

Youth career
- –1995: Torquay United

Senior career*
Years	Team	Apps	(Gls)
1995–1996	Torquay United	5	(0)
1996–2004	Southampton	11	(0)
1998	→ Torquay United (loan)	6	(0)
1999	→ Stockport County (loan)	2	(0)
2001	→ Oxford United (loan)	5	(0)
2002–2003	→ Sheffield Wednesday (loan)	15	(0)
2003–2004	→ Barnsley (loan)	14	(0)
2004	Barnsley	3	(0)
2004–2014	Swansea City	220	(3)
Total		281	(3)

Managerial career
- 2014–2015: Swansea City
- 2016–2017: Leeds United
- 2017: Middlesbrough
- 2018–2019: Birmingham City
- 2019–2020: Sheffield Wednesday
- 2024–2025: Cambridge United
- * Club domestic league appearances and goals

Garry Alan Monk (born 6 March 1979) is an English football manager and former professional player who was most recently the head coach of EFL League One club Cambridge United.

Monk, a centre back, began his playing career with Torquay United before joining Southampton. In nearly eight years, he rarely appeared for the club, instead spending time on loan at Torquay United, Stockport County, Oxford United, Sheffield Wednesday and Barnsley. In 2004 he signed for League Two club Swansea City, and over the next ten years played for them in all four divisions of fully professional football, for the majority of that time as captain, made 270 appearances in all competitions, and was a member of their 2013 League Cup final-winning team.

He began his managerial career with Swansea City, and later took charge of Leeds United, Middlesbrough, Birmingham City and Sheffield Wednesday before joining Cambridge United in March 2024.

== Playing career ==
=== Early career ===
Born in Bedford, Bedfordshire, Monk began his career as a trainee with Torquay United, making five appearances during the 1995–96 season, whilst still a trainee after growing up in Torquay for the majority of his youth. At the end of that season he moved to Southampton to complete his apprenticeship and turned professional with them in May 1997.

Monk returned to Torquay on loan in September 1998 and on returning to The Dell immediately broke into the first team squad, making his first team debut against Derby County on 28 November 1998 in place of the injured Ken Monkou. In September 1999, he had a loan spell at Stockport County, before being recalled to the first team for two matches in January 2000.

He later had a loan spell at Oxford United (in January 2001), but was recalled from Oxford by Glenn Hoddle owing to an injury crisis amongst the Southampton defenders. In May 2001, he started in both of the last two home matches at The Dell, against Manchester United and Arsenal, both of which resulted in victories.

Monk had a longer loan spell with Sheffield Wednesday (from December 2002 to 20 March) with a view to a permanent transfer, which failed to materialise after Wednesday's relegation to Division Two. He eventually left the Saints in February 2004, signing for Barnsley on a free transfer, having been on loan for the previous three months. He struggled to settle in at Oakwell, but scored his first career goal in a 2–1 home FA Cup win against Bristol City on 16 December, and moved to Swansea City on a free transfer in June 2004.

=== Swansea City ===
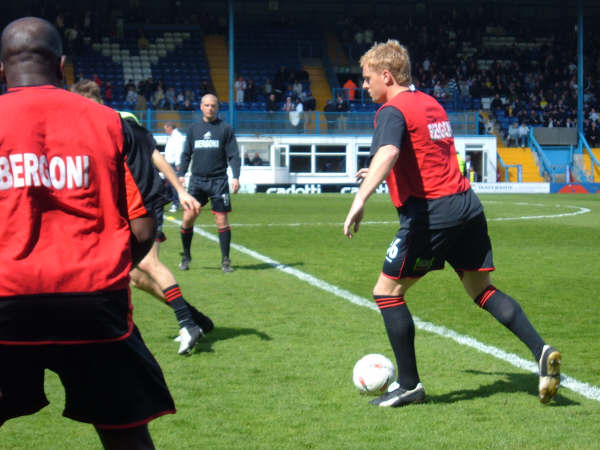
Monk warming up for Swansea before a League Two match at Bury during the 2004–05 season

Monk made his debut for Swansea on 7 August 2004 in their 0–2 defeat to Northampton Town at Vetch Field on the first day of the new League Two season. On 4 September, he was given a straight red card in the 84th minute of the match away to Yeovil Town, for conceding a penalty on Phil Jevons, converted by Gavin Williams for the only goal of the match. Monk was again sent off on 20 November in a 0–2 defeat at Shrewsbury Town for pushing over referee Eddie Ellans in the 43rd minute; teammate Andy Robinson was also dismissed two minutes later. He received a third red card on 8 February 2005 for two bookings in a minute during a 0–1 defeat at Mansfield Town. Swansea finished the season with promotion to League One.

On 22 November 2005, Monk scored his first goal for Swansea, heading their third as they reached the quarter-final of the Football League Trophy with a 4–0 win over Rushden & Diamonds at the Liberty Stadium. The first league goal of his career came on 14 January 2006, opening a 1–1 draw away to Bradford City from Robinson's corner just before half time. Swansea defeated Brentford in the play-off semi-finals, but lost in a penalty shootout to Barnsley in the final at the Millennium Stadium on 27 May. Monk played the full 120 minutes in the final, and put in the cross from which Rory Fallon equalised with an overhead kick.

In August 2006, following the release of Roberto Martínez, it was announced that Monk would become the captain for the forthcoming season. However, just two matches into the 2006–07 season, he picked up a cruciate ligament injury in an innocuous-looking challenge with Scunthorpe striker Andy Keogh, which ruled him out for the whole campaign and with his contract running out at the end of the season his future was in doubt.

Monk returned to the team at the beginning of the 2007–08 season as skipper, captaining the Swans to promotion to the second tier of English football for the first time in 24 years. Monk lifted his first piece of silverware as Swansea captain as the team sealed promotion as League One champions with a club record 92 points. He contributed one goal during the campaign, a header in a 3–2 home win over Leeds United.

The 2008–09 season brought Monk a new central defensive partner in Ashley Williams, signed from Stockport County towards the end of the previous campaign, as Alan Tate was dropped from the side. On 9 August, the opening day of the Championship season, Monk was sent off for a foul on Matt Holland in a 0–2 defeat to Charlton Athletic at The Valley. His only goal of the season was the home winner against Bristol City on 18 April 2009, heading in Andrea Orlandi's corner after 25 minutes. In their first season back in the Championship, Swansea finished 8th.

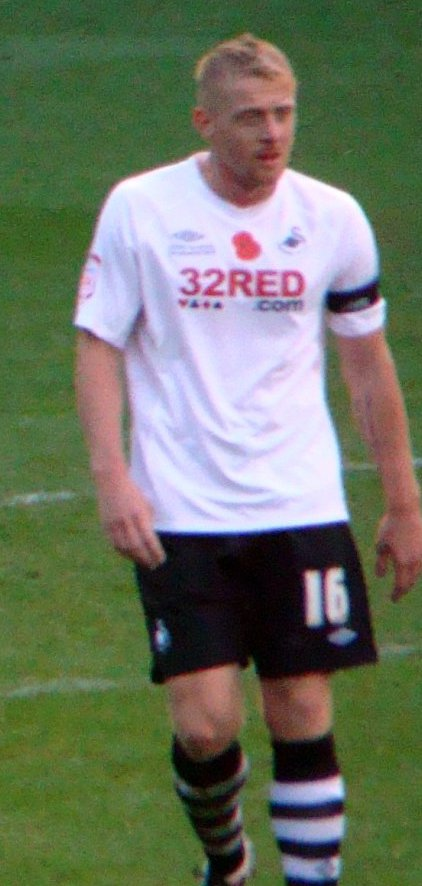
Monk playing for Swansea City in 2010

In the 2009–10 season, Swansea missed out on a Championship play-off place on the final day of the season. On 11 August, in the first round of the League Cup, Monk headed Swansea's first goal of a 3–0 win over Brighton & Hove Albion. Two weeks later, he was one of three Swansea players sent off – alongside Àngel Rangel and Gorka Pintado – as the team lost 1–2 after extra time at home against Scunthorpe United in the second round. Following Paulo Sousa's exit to join Championship rivals Leicester City, Monk criticised his former manager, saying his tactics and training methods were not good enough. Monk's 2012 autobiography Loud, Proud and Positive would later reveal that the Portuguese manager and his captain rarely saw eye to eye.

The 2010–11 season started well, as Monk played every match until picking up an injury against Colchester United in the FA Cup on 8 January 2011. He would soon return to the side, however, and captain the Swans to a place in the Premier League via a Championship play-off final win against Reading. Monk's contribution would be rewarded with a new three-year contract, keeping him at the club until 2014.

On 6 February 2013, Monk signed a one-year contract extension at Swansea, keeping him at the club until June 2015. Later that month, Monk won the first major trophy of his career as Swansea, under manager Michael Laudrup, beat Bradford City 5–0 in the 2013 League Cup final at Wembley Stadium. Monk lifted the cup together with Ashley Williams after coming on as a 62nd-minute substitute for Ki Sung-yueng in the final in a 5–0 win against Bradford City.

After making only 15 appearances across all competitions in the 2012–13 season, 11 of which were in the Premier League, Monk passed Swansea captaincy on to Ashley Williams, who had worn it in Monk's absences during the previous two years.

== Managerial career ==
=== Swansea City ===
On 4 February 2014, Monk was appointed by chairman Huw Jenkins as interim player-manager following the sacking of manager Michael Laudrup. His first match in charge was the South Wales derby on 8 February against Cardiff City, which Swansea won 3–0 with all three goals scored in the second half. After finishing second in their Europa League Group A behind Valencia, Swansea reached the round of 32, in which they were knocked out by Rafa Benítez's Napoli side after losing 3–1 on aggregate.

Swansea survived a relegation battle and secured safety with one match to spare. Monk became the permanent manager of Swansea City on 7 May 2014, ending his playing career and signing a three-year contract.

In the opening match of the 2014–15 season, Monk led Swansea to a 2–1 away win against Manchester United, the club's first ever league win at Old Trafford. The Swans continued their positive start to the league season with two home wins against Burnley and West Bromwich Albion, a run of results which saw Swansea sit joint top of the Premier League table and Monk pick up the Premier League Manager of the Month for August.

After Swansea's 2–1 defeat to Stoke City on 19 October 2014, Monk claimed that Stoke's Victor Moses had dived for a penalty, and said it was "disgusting" of referee Michael Oliver to award it. Although interviewed by the FA and warned about his conduct in media interviews, Monk was not charged over these statements.

On 11 May 2015, Swansea recorded the double over Arsenal, making the Swans only the third side in Premier League history to have won home and away against both Arsenal and Manchester United in the same season. The Swans ended the season in eighth position with a record points tally.

Monk signed a new three-year contract in July 2015.

After 12 years association with the club, Monk was sacked by Swansea on 9 December 2015 following a run of one win in 11 Premier League matches, which left the club 15th in the table. As a result of Monk's sacking, coaches Pep Clotet, James Beattie and Kristian O'Leary also left the club.

=== Leeds United ===
On 2 June 2016, Monk was appointed head coach of Championship club Leeds United on a one-year rolling contract, replacing previous head coach Steve Evans.

Monk made his first signing as Leeds head coach on 28 June 2016, with the addition of Swedish striker Marcus Antonsson for a fee around £2 million. On 7 August, Monk's first match in charge of Leeds was against Q.P.R. in a 3–0 defeat on the opening day of The Championship season. Monk's first victory came in the following match on 10 August with a 5–4 penalty shootout victory for Leeds after a 2–2 draw after extra time against Fleetwood Town.

In November 2016, after guiding Leeds to sixth place and into the Championship play-off positions and also the quarter-finals of the EFL League Cup, Monk was nominated for the Championship Manager of the Month award for October; however, he narrowly missed out with the award going to Newcastle United's Rafa Benitez.

On 29 November 2016, Monk's Leeds were knocked out of the EFL Cup after losing a quarter-final match against Jürgen Klopp's Liverpool at Anfield in a 2–0 defeat, however Leeds had put on an impressive performance against the then Premier League leaders After beating Brentford 1–0 on 17 December, Monk's Leeds were fifth in the playoff positions in the Championship during Christmas 2016, which had been their highest position at this time of the season since Simon Grayson's Leeds side in 2010.

After making several changes to his team, Monk's Leeds side suffered a shock FA Cup exit on 29 January 2017 to the hands of Sutton United after suffering a 1–0 defeat. On 27 February, Monk received a touchline ban after a pitchside spat with Huddersfield Town manager David Wagner, with Monk blocking Wagner's run, after Wagner ran across the pitch to celebrate a goal with his players, the spat started a pitch side tussle between players and staff of both clubs.

After beating Brighton 2–0 on 19 March 2017, Leeds were firmly in the playoff positions and in the hunt for automatic promotion, having pulled 11 points clear of seventh place. However, after a dramatic loss of form in the final eight matches of the season, Leeds mathematically missed out on the playoffs on the final day of the season, finishing in seventh place after being overtaken by Fulham.

After the takeover of Leeds by Andrea Radrizzani two days earlier, and the day before Leeds were set to activate a one-year contract extension with the option of exploring a longer-term deal, on 25 May, Monk resigned as Leeds United head coach, with Radrizzani saying that Monk's decision to quit the club had been a 'shock'.

=== Middlesbrough ===
On 9 June 2017, Monk was appointed as the manager of newly relegated Championship club Middlesbrough, replacing caretaker manager, Steve Agnew. Upon his appointment, Monk stated that he aimed to have the club promoted immediately back to the Premier League. In the summer transfer window, Middlesbrough spent in excess of £40 million on new additions, which included breaking their club-record transfer fee when they signed Britt Assombalonga for £15 million.

His side lost 1–0 to Wolverhampton Wanderers in their opening game of the 2017–18 league campaign. Monk managed to win his first home game in charge, defeating Sheffield United 1–0 at the Riverside Stadium. Form under Monk was inconsistent and, after a 3–0 defeat to Derby County, Middlesbrough dropped out of the play-off places.

On 23 December 2017, Monk was sacked by Middlesbrough, hours after securing a 2–1 win over Sheffield Wednesday. Club chairman Steve Gibson reportedly made the decision to part company over concerns about their style of play, with the club sat ninth in the Championship table at the time of his dismissal. Monk reasoned that existing players were struggling to adapt after years of a rigid style drilled into them by predecessor Aitor Karanka. His tenure of 198 days made him the shortest-serving manager in the club's history. He was replaced by Tony Pulis three days later.

=== Birmingham City ===
Monk was appointed manager of Championship club Birmingham City on 4 March 2018. He signed a three-and-a-half-year deal, and became Birmingham's fifth permanent manager in 15 months. With the team in danger of relegation, he led them to five wins out of the eleven matches remaining; a final-day defeat of promotion candidates Fulham secured a 19th-place finish. In his post-match interview, Monk insisted that the habitual struggle against relegation was unacceptable, he would be "relentless" in raising the mentality throughout the club, and "whoever is not on board with that won't be here."

He excluded several players, including both senior goalkeepers, from consideration for the 2018–19 first team. Operating under an EFL-imposed business plan and with a likely points deduction pending for the club's breaches of the league's Profitability and Sustainability rules, Monk was able to sign one player for a fee and up to five loans or free transfers on wages pitched at a "debilitating" level. After a slow start to the season, four wins in October earned Monk a nomination as Championship Manager of the Month as the team rose to ninth in the table. According to the Birmingham Mail, he turned them into "a side vastly superior than the sum of its parts" to keep them in the top half of the table until a run of losses in March and a nine-point deduction meant they were again in a relegation battle; they finished 17th.

In June 2019, it was reported that the relationship between Monk and chief executive Xuandong Ren had broken down, with Ren dissatisfied with Monk's playing style and plans for the new season and Monk unhappy at the sale of the creative Jota. After making it clear he would not resign, Monk was sacked on 18 June. A club statement with echoes of Monk's own of a year earlier called for a change in footballing philosophy and stressed the vital importance of "everybody at the club to be sharing the same vision and commitment to the plans and processes."

=== Sheffield Wednesday ===
On 6 September 2019, Monk was appointed as manager at Sheffield Wednesday, replacing Steve Bruce who resigned a few months prior. He signed a contract of an unspecified length. In November 2019 when Wednesday were set to play former club Birmingham, now managed by his former assistant Pep Clotet, Monk spoke negatively about Clotet in his pre-match press conference in addition to refusing to shake his hand after the match. When the two managers faced each other again in the reverse fixture later in the season however, Monk and Clotet shook hands and appeared to settle their differences. On 9 November 2020, he was sacked from Sheffield Wednesday, with the club second-last in the league.

=== Cambridge United ===
On 4 March 2024, after over three years away from football, Monk was appointed head coach of Cambridge United on a contract until the end of the 2025–26 season. With the club embroiled in a relegation battle, his first game in charge was a 1–1 draw at home against Northampton Town. After 7 games without a win, Monk recorded his first success with a 2–0 victory over promotion-chasing Barnsley, boosting Cambridge's hopes of survival. Cambridge secured their safety with a goalless draw against relegated Port Vale on the final day of the season.

On 16 February 2025, Monk was announced to have departed the club, with the U's sitting bottom of the league, eight points from safety.

== Career statistics ==
Appearances and goals by club, season and competition
Club	Season	League			FA Cup		League Cup		Other		Total	
Club	Season	Division	Apps	Goals	Apps	Goals	Apps	Goals	Apps	Goals	Apps	Goals
Torquay United	1995–96	Third Division	5	0	0	0	0	0	0	0	5	0
Southampton	1996–97	Premier League	0	0	0	0	0	0	—		0	0
Southampton	1997–98	Premier League	0	0	0	0	0	0	—		0	0
Southampton	1998–99	Premier League	4	0	1	0	0	0	0	0	5	0
Southampton	1999–2000	Premier League	2	0	—		0	0	—		2	0
Southampton	2000–01	Premier League	2	0	0	0	0	0	—		2	0
Southampton	2001–02	Premier League	2	0	0	0	1	0	—		3	0
Southampton	2002–03	Premier League	1	0	0	0	0	0	—		1	0
Southampton	2003–04	Premier League	0	0	—		0	0	0	0	0	0
Southampton	Total		11	0	1	0	1	0	0	0	13	0
Torquay United (loan)	1998–99	Third Division	6	0	—		—		—		6	0
Stockport County (loan)	1999–2000	First Division	2	0	—		2	0	—		4	0
Oxford United (loan)	2000–01	Second Division	5	0	—		—		—		5	0
Sheffield Wednesday (loan)	2002–03	First Division	15	0	0	0	—		—		15	0
Barnsley	2003–04	Second Division	17	0	4	1	—		—		21	1
Swansea City	2004–05	League Two	34	0	4	0	1	0	2 (Note: Appearances in Football League Trophy)	0	41	0
Swansea City	2005–06	League One	33	1	0	0	0	0	9 (Note: Six appearances and one goal in Football League Trophy, three appearances in League One play-offs)	1	42	2
Swansea City	2006–07	League One	2	0	0	0	0	0	0	0	2	0
Swansea City	2007–08	League One	32	1	3	0	2	0	6	0	43	1
Swansea City	2008–09	Championship	40	1	3	0	3	0	—		46	1
Swansea City	2009–10	Championship	23	0	1	0	2	1	—		26	1
Swansea City	2010–11	Championship	29	0	1	1	3	0	3 (Note: Appearances in Championship play-offs)	0	36	1
Swansea City	2011–12	Premier League	16	0	2	0	0	0	—		18	0
Swansea City	2012–13	Premier League	11	0	0	0	4	1	—		15	1
Swansea City	2013–14	Premier League	0	0	0	0	1	0	—		1	0
Swansea City	Total		220	3	14	1	16	2	20	1	270	7
Career total			281	3	19	2	19	2	20	1	339	8

== Managerial statistics ==
As of match played 15 February 2025

Managerial record by team and tenure
Team	From	To	Record					Ref.
Team	From	To	P	W	D	L	Win %	Ref.
Swansea City	4 February 2014	9 December 2015	77	28	17	32	36.36	
Leeds United	2 June 2016	25 May 2017	53	25	11	17	47.17	
Middlesbrough	9 June 2017	23 December 2017	26	12	5	9	46.15	
Birmingham City	4 March 2018	18 June 2019	59	19	20	20	32.20	
Sheffield Wednesday	6 September 2019	9 November 2020	58	18	15	25	31.03	
Cambridge United	4 March 2024	16 February 2025	49	9	13	27	18.37	
Total			322	111	81	130	34.47	

== Honours ==
=== Player ===
Swansea City

- Football League Championship play-offs: 2011
- Football League One: 2007–08
- Football League Cup: 2012–13
- Football League Trophy: 2005–06
- FAW Premier Cup: 2004–05, 2005–06

Individual

- PFA Team of the Year: 2007–08 League One

=== Manager ===
Individual

- Premier League Manager of the Month: August 2014
