= PFA Team of the Year (2000s) =

Annual award

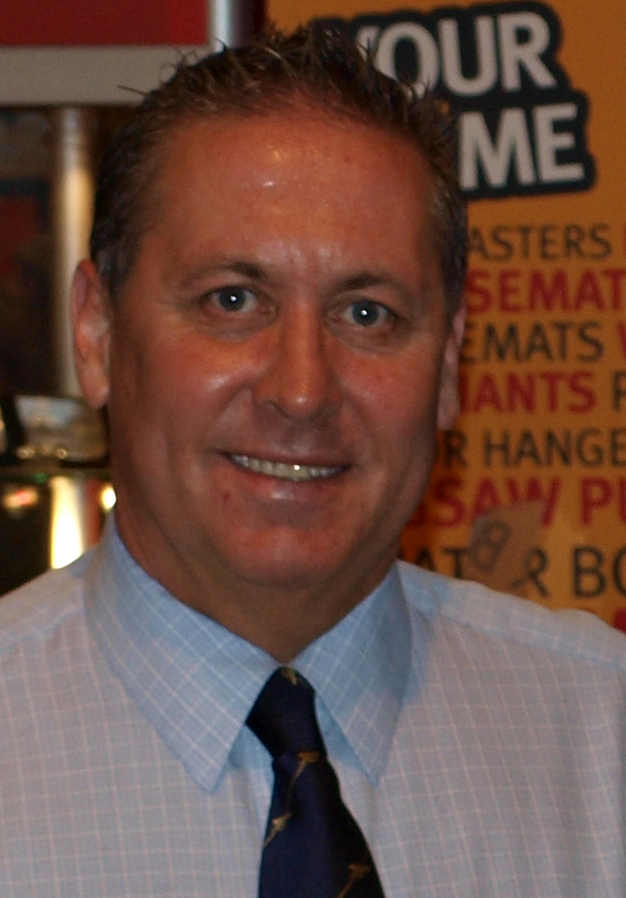
Kenny Sansom appeared in a PFA Team of the Year on 11 occasions, which is more than any other player.

The Professional Footballers' Association Team of the Year (often called the PFA Team of the Year, or simply the Team of the Year) is an annual award given to a set of 55 footballers across the top four tiers of men's English football; the Premier League, the Championship, League One and League Two, as well as the women's FA WSL, who are seen to be deserving of being named in a "Team of the Year". Peter Shilton currently holds the most appearances in the PFA Team of the Year in the top division with 10 appearances. Steven Gerrard currently holds the most appearances in the PFA Team of the Year in the Premier League era with eight appearances.

The award has been presented since the 1973–74 season and the shortlist is compiled by the members of the players' trade union, the Professional Footballers' Association (PFA), in January of every year, with the winners then being voted for by the other players in their respective divisions. The award is regarded by players in the Football League as the highest accolade available to them, due to it being picked by their fellow professionals. Oxford United's Damian Batt, who was named in the Team of the Year for League Two in 2011, said he was "very pleased to be given such a prestigious award. It is something that I am very proud of". In 2014, a team for female players competing in the FA WSL was selected for the first time.

== Key ==
- Heading key: Pos. – Position; App. – Number of appearances in a PFA Team of the Year.
- Position key: GK – Goalkeeper; DF – Defender; MF – Midfielder; FW – Forward.
- Players marked † appeared in a first tier PFA Team of the Year more than once.
- Players marked ‡ appeared in a second tier PFA Team of the Year more than once.
- Players marked * appeared in a third tier PFA Team of the Year more than once.
- Players marked ¤ appeared in a fourth tier PFA Team of the Year more than once.

== Winners ==
=== 1999-2000 ===
==== FA Premier League ====
Pos.	Player	Club	App.
GK	Nigel Martyn †	Leeds United	5
DF	Gary Kelly †	Leeds United	2
DF	Jaap Stam †	Manchester United	2
DF	Sami Hyypiä	Liverpool	1
DF	Ian Harte	Leeds United	1
MF	David Beckham †	Manchester United	4
MF	Roy Keane †	Manchester United	3
MF	Patrick Vieira †	Arsenal	2
MF	Harry Kewell	Leeds United	1
FW	Andy Cole	Manchester United	1
FW	Kevin Phillips	Sunderland	1

==== First Division ====
Pos.	Player	Club	App.
GK	Richard Wright ‡	Ipswich Town	2
DF	Gary Rowett ‡	Birmingham City	2
DF	Richard Rufus ‡	Charlton Athletic	2
DF	Chris Coleman	Fulham	5
DF	Chris Powell	Charlton Athletic	1
MF	John Robinson ‡	Charlton Athletic	2
MF	Craig Hignett	Barnsley	1
MF	Mark Kinsella	Charlton Athletic	2
MF	Mark Kennedy	Manchester City	1
FW	Andy Hunt	Charlton Athletic	1
FW	Marcus Stewart	Ipswich Town	2

==== Second Division ====
Pos.	Player	Club	App.
GK	Roy Carroll	Wigan Athletic	1
DF	Graham Alexander	Preston North End	1
DF	Steve Davis *	Burnley	4
DF	Michael Jackson	Preston North End	1
DF	Mickey Bell	Bristol City	1
MF	Glen Little	Burnley	1
MF	Sean Gregan *	Preston North End	2
MF	Darren Caskey	Reading	1
MF	Graham Kavanagh *	Stoke City	2
FW	Jason Roberts	Bristol Rovers	1
FW	Jon Macken	Preston North End	1

==== Third Division ====
Pos.	Player	Club	App.
GK	Mike Pollitt	Rotherham United	1
DF	Ian Hendon ¤	Northampton Town	3
DF	Matthew Bound	Swansea City	1
DF	Craig Liddle	Darlington	1
DF	Matt Lockwood	Leyton Orient	1
MF	Darren Currie	Barnet	1
MF	Tommy Miller	Hartlepool United	1
MF	Nick Cusack	Swansea City	1
MF	Neil Heaney	Darlington	1
FW	Marco Gabbiadini	Darlington	1
FW	Richie Barker	Macclesfield Town	1

=== 2000–01 ===
==== FA Premier League ====
Pos.	Player	Club	App.
GK	Fabien Barthez	Manchester United	1
DF	Stephen Carr	Tottenham Hotspur	1
DF	Jaap Stam †	Manchester United	3
DF	Wes Brown	Manchester United	1
DF	Sylvinho	Arsenal	1
MF	Steven Gerrard	Liverpool	1
MF	Roy Keane †	Manchester United	4
MF	Patrick Vieira †	Arsenal	3
MF	Ryan Giggs †	Manchester United	3
FW	Teddy Sheringham	Manchester United	1
FW	Thierry Henry	Arsenal	1

==== First Division ====
Pos.	Player	Club	App.
GK	Maik Taylor	Fulham	2
DF	Steve Finnan	Fulham	2
DF	Chris Coleman ‡	Fulham	6
DF	Henning Berg	Blackburn Rovers	1
DF	Martin Grainger	Birmingham City	1
MF	David Dunn	Blackburn Rovers	1
MF	Lee Clark ‡	Fulham	3
MF	Sean Davis	Fulham	1
MF	Damien Duff	Blackburn Rovers	1
FW	Louis Saha	Fulham	1
FW	Matt Jansen	Blackburn Rovers	1

==== Second Division ====
Pos.	Player	Club	App.
GK	Jimmy Walker	Walsall	1
DF	Matt Lawrence	Millwall	1
DF	Arjan de Zeeuw	Wigan Athletic	1
DF	Andy Tillson	Walsall	1
DF	Mickey Bell *	Bristol City	2
MF	Scott Murray	Bristol City	1
MF	Graham Kavanagh *	Stoke City	3
MF	Tim Cahill	Millwall	1
MF	Brian Tinnion	Bristol City	1
FW	Neil Harris	Millwall	1
FW	Martin Butler	Reading	2

==== Third Division ====
Pos.	Player	Club	App.
GK	Mike Pollitt ¤	Chesterfield	2
DF	Josh Low	Cardiff City	1
DF	Steve Blatherwick	Chesterfield	1
DF	Danny Cullip	Brighton & Hove Albion	1
DF	Matt Lockwood ¤	Leyton Orient	2
MF	Darren Currie ¤	Barnet	2
MF	Lee Hodges	Scunthorpe United	1
MF	Tommy Miller ¤	Hartlepool United	2
MF	Paul Simpson	Blackpool	1
FW	Bobby Zamora	Brighton & Hove Albion	1
FW	Robert Earnshaw	Cardiff City	1

=== 2001–02 ===
==== FA Premier League ====
Pos.	Player	Club	App.
GK	Shay Given	Newcastle United	1
DF	Steve Finnan	Fulham	3
DF	Rio Ferdinand	Leeds United	1
DF	Sami Hyypiä †	Liverpool	2
DF	Wayne Bridge	Southampton	1
MF	Robert Pires	Arsenal	1
MF	Roy Keane †	Manchester United	5
MF	Patrick Vieira †	Arsenal	4
MF	Ryan Giggs †	Manchester United	4
FW	Ruud van Nistelrooy	Manchester United	1
FW	Thierry Henry †	Arsenal	2

==== First Division ====
Pos.	Player	Club	App.
GK	Russell Hoult	West Bromwich Albion	1
DF	Graham Alexander	Preston North End	2
DF	Darren Moore ‡	West Bromwich Albion	2
DF	Joleon Lescott	Wolverhampton Wanderers	1
DF	Neil Clement	West Bromwich Albion	1
MF	Eyal Berkovic	Manchester City	1
MF	Ali Benarbia	Manchester City	1
MF	Robert Prosinečki	Portsmouth	1
MF	Mark Kennedy	Wolverhampton Wanderers	2
FW	Shaun Goater	Manchester City	2
FW	Dougie Freedman	Crystal Palace	2

==== Second Division ====
Pos.	Player	Club	App.
GK	Mark Tyler	Peterborough United	1
DF	Graeme Murty	Reading	1
DF	Arjan de Zeeuw *	Wigan Athletic	2
DF	Danny Cullip	Brighton & Hove Albion	2
DF	Mickey Bell *	Bristol City	3
MF	Scott Murray	Bristol City	2
MF	Graham Kavanagh *	Cardiff City	4
MF	Paul Evans	Brentford	1
MF	Jason Koumas	Tranmere Rovers	1
FW	Bobby Zamora	Brighton & Hove Albion	2
FW	Nicky Forster *	Reading	2

==== Third Division ====
Pos.	Player	Club	App.
GK	Romain Larrieu	Plymouth Argyle	1
DF	Michael Duff	Cheltenham Town	1
DF	Paul Wotton	Plymouth Argyle	1
DF	Graham Coughlan	Plymouth Argyle	1
DF	Matthew Taylor	Luton Town	1
MF	Peter Beagrie	Scunthorpe United	1
MF	David Friio	Plymouth Argyle	1
MF	Lee Hodges ¤	Scunthorpe United	2
MF	Lee Williamson	Mansfield Town	1
FW	Chris Greenacre	Mansfield Town	1
FW	Nathan Ellington	Bristol Rovers	1

=== 2002–03 ===
==== FA Premier League ====
Pos.	Player	Club	App.
GK	Brad Friedel	Blackburn Rovers	1
DF	Stephen Carr †	Tottenham Hotspur	2
DF	Sol Campbell †	Arsenal	2
DF	William Gallas	Chelsea	1
DF	Ashley Cole	Arsenal	1
MF	Robert Pires †	Arsenal	2
MF	Patrick Vieira †	Arsenal	5
MF	Paul Scholes	Manchester United	1
MF	Kieron Dyer	Newcastle United	3
FW	Thierry Henry †	Arsenal	3
FW	Alan Shearer †	Newcastle United	7

==== First Division ====
Pos.	Player	Club	App.
GK	Shaka Hislop ‡	Portsmouth	2
DF	Denis Irwin ‡	Wolverhampton Wanderers	4
DF	Joleon Lescott ‡	Wolverhampton Wanderers	2
DF	Michael Dawson	Nottingham Forest	1
DF	Matthew Taylor	Portsmouth	2
MF	Muzzy Izzet	Leicester City	1
MF	Michael Brown	Sheffield United	1
MF	Paul Merson ‡	Portsmouth	2
MF	Michael Tonge	Sheffield United	1
FW	David Johnson	Nottingham Forest	1
FW	Paul Dickov	Leicester City	1

==== Second Division ====
Pos.	Player	Club	App.
GK	John Filan	Wigan Athletic	1
DF	Nicky Eaden	Wigan Athletic	1
DF	Jason de Vos	Wigan Athletic	1
DF	Fitz Hall	Oldham Athletic	1
DF	Mickey Bell *	Bristol City	4
MF	Scott Murray *	Bristol City	3
MF	Jimmy Bullard	Wigan Athletic	1
MF	Graham Kavanagh *	Cardiff City	5
MF	Martin Bullock	Blackpool	1
FW	Robert Earnshaw	Cardiff City	2
FW	Rob Hulse	Crewe Alexandra	1

==== Third Division ====
Pos.	Player	Club	App.
GK	Alan Fettis	Hull City (Note: Fettis played for York City until January 2003.)	1
DF	Carlos Edwards	Wrexham	1
DF	Graeme Lee	Hartlepool United	1
DF	Chris Westwood	Hartlepool United	1
DF	Paul Underwood	Rushden & Diamonds	1
MF	Paul Hall	Rushden & Diamonds	1
MF	Mark Tinkler	Hartlepool United	1
MF	Alex Russell	Torquay United	1
MF	Ritchie Humphreys	Hartlepool United	1
FW	Andy Morrell	Wrexham	1
FW	Dave Kitson	Cambridge United	1

=== 2003–04 ===
==== FA Premier League ====
Pos.	Player	Club	App.
GK	Tim Howard	Manchester United	1
DF	Lauren	Arsenal	1
DF	Sol Campbell †	Arsenal	3
DF	John Terry	Chelsea	1
DF	Ashley Cole †	Arsenal	2
MF	Steven Gerrard †	Liverpool	2
MF	Frank Lampard	Chelsea	1
MF	Patrick Vieira †	Arsenal	6
MF	Robert Pires †	Arsenal	3
FW	Thierry Henry †	Arsenal	4
FW	Ruud van Nistelrooy †	Manchester United	2

==== First Division ====
Pos.	Player	Club	App.
GK	Robert Green	Norwich City	1
DF	Phil Jagielka	Sheffield United	1
DF	Danny Gabbidon	Cardiff City	1
DF	Malky Mackay	Norwich City	1
DF	Julio Arca	Sunderland	1
MF	Jason Koumas	West Bromwich Albion	2
MF	Tim Cahill	Millwall	2
MF	Michael Carrick	West Ham United	1
MF	Andy Reid	Nottingham Forest	1
FW	Andrew Johnson	Crystal Palace	1
FW	Robert Earnshaw	Cardiff City	3

==== Second Division ====
Pos.	Player	Club	App.
GK	Steve Phillips	Bristol City	1
DF	Louis Carey	Bristol City	1
DF	Graham Coughlan	Plymouth Argyle	2
DF	Danny Cullip *	Brighton & Hove Albion	3
DF	Gino Padula	Queens Park Rangers	1
MF	Carlos Edwards	Wrexham	2
MF	David Friio	Plymouth Argyle	2
MF	Richie Wellens	Blackpool	1
MF	Brian Tinnion *	Bristol City	2
FW	Leon Knight	Brighton & Hove Albion	1
FW	Scott Taylor	Blackpool	1

==== Third Division ====
Pos.	Player	Club	App.
GK	Chris Weale	Yeovil Town	1
DF	Nathan Stanton	Scunthorpe United	1
DF	Andy Crosby	Oxford United	1
DF	Efe Sodje	Huddersfield Town	1
DF	Andy Dawson	Hull City	1
MF	Liam Lawrence	Mansfield Town	1
MF	Michael McIndoe	Doncaster Rovers	1
MF	Alex Russell ¤	Torquay United	2
MF	Peter Beagrie ¤	Scunthorpe United	2
FW	David Graham	Torquay United	1
FW	Lee Trundle	Swansea City	1

=== 2004–05 ===
==== FA Premier League ====
Pos.	Player	Club	App.
GK	Petr Čech	Chelsea	1
DF	Gary Neville †	Manchester United	5
DF	John Terry †	Chelsea	2
DF	Rio Ferdinand †	Manchester United	2
DF	Ashley Cole †	Arsenal	3
MF	Shaun Wright-Phillips	Manchester City	1
MF	Steven Gerrard †	Liverpool	3
MF	Frank Lampard †	Chelsea	2
MF	Arjen Robben	Chelsea	1
FW	Andrew Johnson	Crystal Palace	2
FW	Thierry Henry †	Arsenal	5

==== Championship ====
Pos.	Player	Club	App.
GK	Kelvin Davis	Ipswich Town	1
DF	Graham Alexander ‡	Preston North End	3
DF	Tom Huddlestone	Derby County	1
DF	Gary Breen	Sunderland	1
DF	George McCartney	Sunderland	1
MF	Iñigo Idiakez	Derby County	1
MF	Jimmy Bullard	Wigan Athletic	2
MF	Steve Sidwell	Reading	1
MF	Julio Arca ‡	Sunderland	2
FW	Nathan Ellington	Wigan Athletic	2
FW	Jason Roberts	Wigan Athletic	2

==== League One ====
Pos.	Player	Club	App.
GK	Marlon Beresford *	Luton Town	3
DF	Ryan Taylor	Tranmere Rovers	1
DF	Curtis Davies	Luton Town	1
DF	Chris Coyne	Luton Town	1
DF	Warren Cummings	Bournemouth	1
MF	Ahmet Brković	Luton Town	1
MF	Paul Merson	Walsall	3
MF	Kevin Nicholls	Luton Town	1
MF	Stuart Elliott	Hull City	1
FW	Steve Howard	Luton Town	1
FW	Leroy Lita	Bristol City	1

==== League Two ====
Pos.	Player	Club	App.
GK	Chris Weale ¤	Yeovil Town	2
DF	Sam Ricketts	Swansea City	1
DF	Adam Barrett	Southend United	1
DF	Andy Crosby ¤	Scunthorpe United	2
DF	Michael Rose	Yeovil Town	1
MF	Lee Johnson	Yeovil Town	1
MF	Darren Way	Yeovil Town	1
MF	Kevin Maher	Southend United	1
MF	Peter Beagrie ¤	Scunthorpe United	3
FW	Phil Jevons	Yeovil Town	1
FW	Lee Trundle ¤	Swansea City	2

=== 2005–06 ===
==== FA Premier League ====
Pos.	Player	Club	App.
GK	Shay Given †	Newcastle United	2
DF	Pascal Chimbonda	Wigan Athletic	1
DF	John Terry †	Chelsea	3
DF	Jamie Carragher	Liverpool	1
DF	William Gallas †	Chelsea	2
MF	Cristiano Ronaldo	Manchester United	1
MF	Steven Gerrard †	Liverpool	4
MF	Frank Lampard †	Chelsea	3
MF	Joe Cole	Chelsea	1
FW	Thierry Henry †	Arsenal	6
FW	Wayne Rooney	Manchester United	1

==== Championship ====
Pos.	Player	Club	App.
GK	Marcus Hahnemann	Reading	1
DF	Gary Kelly	Leeds United	3
DF	Ibrahima Sonko	Reading	1
DF	Joleon Lescott ‡	Wolverhampton Wanderers	3
DF	Nicky Shorey	Reading	1
MF	Ashley Young	Watford	1
MF	Steve Sidwell ‡	Reading	2
MF	Phil Jagielka ‡	Sheffield United	2
MF	Jason Koumas ‡	Cardiff City	3
FW	Marlon King	Watford	1
FW	Kevin Doyle	Reading	1

==== League One ====
Pos.	Player	Club	App.
GK	Darryl Flahavan	Southend United	1
DF	Greg Halford	Colchester United	1
DF	Sam Sodje	Brentford	1
DF	Adam Barrett	Southend United	2
DF	Gareth Roberts	Tranmere Rovers	1
MF	Andy Robinson	Swansea City	1
MF	Neil Danns	Colchester United	1
MF	Kevin Maher	Southend United	2
MF	Michael McIndoe	Doncaster Rovers	2
FW	Lee Trundle	Swansea City	3
FW	Billy Sharp	Scunthorpe United	1

==== League Two ====
Pos.	Player	Club	App.
GK	Joe Hart	Shrewsbury Town	1
DF	Danny Senda	Wycombe Wanderers	1
DF	Roger Johnson	Wycombe Wanderers	1
DF	Gareth McAuley	Lincoln City	1
DF	Matt Lockwood ¤	Leyton Orient	3
MF	Josh Low ¤	Northampton Town	2
MF	Mark Jones	Wrexham	1
MF	Ian Taylor	Northampton Town	3
MF	Kevin Betsy	Wycombe Wanderers	1
FW	Karl Hawley	Carlisle United	1
FW	Michael Reddy	Grimsby Town	1

=== 2006–07 ===
==== FA Premier League ====
Pos.	Player	Club	App.
GK	Edwin van der Sar	Manchester United	1
DF	Gary Neville †	Manchester United	6
DF	Rio Ferdinand †	Manchester United	3
DF	Nemanja Vidić	Manchester United	1
DF	Patrice Evra	Manchester United	1
MF	Cristiano Ronaldo †	Manchester United	2
MF	Steven Gerrard †	Liverpool	5
MF	Paul Scholes †	Manchester United	2
MF	Ryan Giggs †	Manchester United	5
FW	Didier Drogba	Chelsea	1
FW	Dimitar Berbatov	Tottenham Hotspur	1

==== Championship ====
Pos.	Player	Club	App.
GK	Matt Murray	Wolverhampton Wanderers	1
DF	Graham Alexander ‡	Preston North End	4
DF	Darren Moore ‡	Derby County	3
DF	Curtis Davies	West Bromwich Albion	2
DF	Gareth Bale	Southampton	1
MF	Carlos Edwards	Sunderland (Note: Edwards played for Luton Town until January 2007.)	3
MF	Dean Whitehead	Sunderland	1
MF	Jason Koumas ‡	West Bromwich Albion	4
MF	Gary McSheffrey	Birmingham City	1
FW	Michael Chopra	Cardiff City	1
FW	Diomansy Kamara	West Bromwich Albion	1

==== League One ====
Pos.	Player	Club	App.
GK	Joe Murphy	Scunthorpe United	1
DF	Jon Otsemobor	Crewe Alexandra	1
DF	Terry Skiverton	Yeovil Town	1
DF	Ian Breckin	Nottingham Forest	1
DF	Matt Lockwood	Leyton Orient	4
MF	Chris Shuker	Tranmere Rovers	1
MF	Richie Wellens *	Doncaster Rovers	2
MF	Wes Hoolahan	Blackpool	1
MF	Matt Jarvis	Gillingham	1
FW	Luke Varney	Crewe Alexandra	1
FW	Billy Sharp *	Scunthorpe United	2

==== League Two ====
Pos.	Player	Club	App.
GK	Clayton Ince	Walsall	1
DF	Craig Pead	Walsall	1
DF	Michael Nelson	Hartlepool United	1
DF	Chris Westwood ¤	Walsall	2
DF	Ritchie Humphreys ¤	Hartlepool United (Note: Humphreys played for Port Vale on loan from September to October 2006.)	2
MF	Lee Frecklington	Lincoln City	1
MF	Dean Keates	Walsall	1
MF	Andy Monkhouse	Hartlepool United	1
MF	Tommy Doherty	Wycombe Wanderers	1
FW	Izale McLeod	Milton Keynes Dons	1
FW	Jermaine Easter	Wycombe Wanderers	1

=== 2007–08 ===
==== Premier League ====
Pos.	Player	Club	App.
GK	David James †	Portsmouth	3
DF	Bacary Sagna	Arsenal	1
DF	Rio Ferdinand †	Manchester United	4
DF	Nemanja Vidić †	Manchester United	2
DF	Gaël Clichy	Arsenal	1
MF	Cristiano Ronaldo †	Manchester United	3
MF	Steven Gerrard †	Liverpool	6
MF	Cesc Fàbregas	Arsenal	1
MF	Ashley Young	Aston Villa	2
FW	Emmanuel Adebayor	Arsenal	1
FW	Fernando Torres	Liverpool	1

==== Championship ====
Pos.	Player	Club	App.
GK	Wayne Hennessey	Wolverhampton Wanderers	1
DF	Bradley Orr	Bristol City	1
DF	Ryan Shawcross	Stoke City	1
DF	Danny Shittu	Watford	1
DF	Paul Robinson	West Bromwich Albion	1
MF	Liam Lawrence	Stoke City	2
MF	Brian Howard	Barnsley	1
MF	Marvin Elliott	Bristol City	1
MF	Jonathan Greening	West Bromwich Albion	1
FW	Ricardo Fuller	Stoke City	1
FW	Kevin Phillips	West Bromwich Albion	2

==== League One ====
Pos.	Player	Club	App.
GK	Keiren Westwood	Carlisle United	1
DF	Àngel Rangel	Swansea City	1
DF	Garry Monk	Swansea City	1
DF	Danny Livesey	Carlisle United	1
DF	Julian Bennett	Nottingham Forest	1
MF	Andy Robinson *	Swansea City	2
MF	Ferrie Bodde	Swansea City	1
MF	Richie Wellens *	Doncaster Rovers	3
MF	Kris Commons	Nottingham Forest	1
FW	Jermaine Beckford	Leeds United	1
FW	Jason Scotland	Swansea City	1

==== League Two ====
Pos.	Player	Club	App.
GK	Joe Lewis	Peterborough United (Note: Lewis played for Morecambe until January 2008.)	1
DF	Craig Pead ¤	Brentford	2
DF	Steve Foster	Darlington	1
DF	Danny Swailes	Milton Keynes Dons	1
DF	Dean Lewington	Milton Keynes Dons	1
MF	Jason Puncheon	Barnet	1
MF	Keith Andrews	Milton Keynes Dons	1
MF	Lloyd Dyer	Milton Keynes Dons	1
MF	George Boyd	Peterborough United	1
FW	Jack Lester	Chesterfield	1
FW	Aaron McLean	Peterborough United	1

=== 2008–09 ===
==== Premier League ====
Pos.	Player	Club	App.
GK	Edwin van der Sar †	Manchester United	2
DF	Glen Johnson	Portsmouth	1
DF	Rio Ferdinand †	Manchester United	5
DF	Nemanja Vidić †	Manchester United	3
DF	Patrice Evra †	Manchester United	2
MF	Cristiano Ronaldo †	Manchester United	4
MF	Steven Gerrard †	Liverpool	7
MF	Ryan Giggs †	Manchester United	6
MF	Ashley Young †	Aston Villa	3
FW	Nicolas Anelka †	Chelsea	2
FW	Fernando Torres †	Liverpool	2

==== Championship ====
Pos.	Player	Club	App.
GK	Keiren Westwood	Coventry City	2
DF	Kyle Naughton	Sheffield United	1
DF	Roger Johnson	Cardiff City	2
DF	Richard Stearman	Wolverhampton Wanderers	1
DF	Danny Fox	Coventry City	1
MF	Michael Kightly	Wolverhampton Wanderers	1
MF	Joe Ledley	Cardiff City	1
MF	Jordi Gómez	Swansea City	1
MF	Stephen Hunt	Reading	1
FW	Sylvan Ebanks-Blake	Wolverhampton Wanderers	1
FW	Jason Scotland	Swansea City	2

==== League One ====
Pos.	Player	Club	App.
GK	Joe Murphy *	Scunthorpe United	2
DF	Neal Eardley	Oldham Athletic	1
DF	Jack Hobbs	Leicester City	1
DF	Sean O'Hanlon	Milton Keynes Dons	1
DF	Dean Lewington	Milton Keynes Dons	2
MF	Fabian Delph	Leeds United	1
MF	Matt Oakley	Leicester City	1
MF	Chris Taylor	Oldham Athletic	1
MF	George Boyd	Peterborough United	2
FW	Rickie Lambert	Bristol Rovers	1
FW	Matty Fryatt	Leicester City	1

==== League Two ====
Pos.	Player	Club	App.
GK	Scott Shearer	Wycombe Wanderers	1
DF	Neil Austin	Darlington	1
DF	David McCracken	Wycombe Wanderers	1
DF	Simon King	Gillingham	1
MF	Tom Kennedy	Rochdale	1
MF	Omar Daley	Bradford City	1
MF	Dany N'Guessan	Lincoln City	1
MF	Ben Davies	Shrewsbury Town	1
MF	Tommy Doherty ¤	Wycombe Wanderers	2
FW	Grant Holt	Shrewsbury Town	1
FW	Andy Bishop	Bury	1

== See also ==
- PFA Team of the Year (1970s)
- PFA Team of the Year (1980s)
- PFA Team of the Year (1990s)
- PFA Team of the Year (2010s)
- PFA Team of the Year (2020s)
