= Thomas Butler (footballer, born 1981) =

Irish footballer

Personal information
- Full name: Thomas Anthony Butler
- Date of birth: 25 April 1981 (age 45)
- Place of birth: Dublin, Ireland
- Height: 5 ft 8 in (1.73 m)
- Position: Midfielder

Youth career
- Belvedere

Senior career*
Years	Team	Apps	(Gls)
1998–2004	Sunderland	31	(0)
2000	→ Darlington (loan)	8	(0)
2004–2005	Dunfermline Athletic	12	(0)
2005–2006	Hartlepool United	37	(2)
2006–2012	Swansea City	126	(9)
2015	Alnwick Town	4	(0)
2019–2020	Newcastle Blue Star		
2020–	Wear United	4	(3)
Total		220	(15)

International career^{‡}
1999–2000	Republic of Ireland U18	3	(0)
2002	Republic of Ireland U20	2	(0)
2001–2003	Republic of Ireland U21	13	(0)
2002	Republic of Ireland	2	(0)

Managerial career
- 2015: Newcastle United W.F.C.
- * Club domestic league appearances and goals as of 17:22, 20 January 2012 (UTC) ‡ National team caps and goals as of 4 August 2008 (UTC)

Thomas Anthony Butler (born 25 April 1981) is an Irish former professional footballer who played as a midfielder. He represented the Republic of Ireland at under-21 and senior level.

== Club career ==
=== Sunderland ===
Butler started his career at Sunderland, and as a youngster forged himself a reputation as one of the Republic of Ireland's brightest stars and he gained acclaim when he was named the Republic of Ireland's Under-15 Player of the Year in 1997. By the time he was 18, he had travelled to South Africa to play in the 1999 World Youth Cup for his country. Butler was then signed to a professional contract by Peter Reid for Sunderland.

Shortly thereafter, Butler made his debut during Sunderland's 3–2 win over Walsall during the 1999–2000 season after coming on as a substitute. Butler was on the verge of breaking into the first team and was successful for the reserves. This earned him a chance to make his first league appearance after once again coming on as a substitute against West Ham. He would soon earn praise, being considered by some as the Irish version of Joe Cole.

However, the following season saw Butler struggling to make an impact and he was loaned to Darlington to gain match practice. His loan spell with Darlington would be extended for another month. He made ten appearances for Darlington, but despite his popularity among the fans his loan move was not extended and Butler returned to Sunderland. The following seasons saw Butler make just 17 starts and 12 substitute appearances. In a match against Charlton Athletic on 27 April 2002, Butler helped the club make a comeback just after Charlton scored, when he provided assist for Kevin Kilbane, which both side drew 2–2. At the end of the 2001–02 season, Butler's future was in doubt upon the expiry of his contract. However, on 1 August 2002, Butler signed a contract to keep him at Sunderland for three more years, until 2005.

Despite the lack of games, Butler was called up the Republic of Ireland team by Mick McCarthy and made his senior international debut in the 3–0 win against Finland in August 2002. Following the retirement of Kevin Kilbane, Hartlepool Mail believed that Butler could be expected to become a first team regular. During his last season at the club, Butler's season was disrupted by a knee injury he sustained in a 1–0 win over Sheffield United. His injury would keep him out for a long time following an operation.

Butler left Sunderland for unspecified personal reasons, returning to Ireland and stating his intention to leave professional football. While Sunderland were initially sympathetic to his situation, he eventually threatened them with legal action for breach of contract. On 2 July 2005, the dispute between Butler and the club were later settled just before the tribunal could happen.

=== Dunfermline Athletic and Hartlepool United ===
Having reconsidered his future, Butler joined Dunfermline on trial, subsequently signing and making eight starts and six substitute appearances. However, he wasn't offered an extended contract and was forced to look elsewhere.

In 2005, Butler then joined Hartlepool United on a short-term contract. He made his debut against Blackpool. Butler made an impressive start to his Hartlepool career and scored his first professional goal in the 3–0 win against Swindon. Butler then signed permanently for Hartlepool for 2005–06 season despite interests from two clubs. In his first full season at Hartlepool United, Butler scored his first goal of the season when he "raced past two challenges to fire a shot which goalkeeper Mark Goodlad could only help into the net", as Harlepool United beat Port Vale 2–1 on 29 October 2005 Though he made twenty-eight appearances, the club were relegated to League Two after finishing twenty-first place. He was linked with a move to Bradford City, a claim that was denied by Colin Todd.

=== Swansea City ===
July 2006 saw Butler signed for Swansea City following Hartlepool's relegation for an undisclosed fee.

Butler made his debut for the club, in the opening game of the season, as Swansea City would lose Cheltenham Town 2–1. He scored his first goal, which Swansea City scored two goals in the last minutes, as they beat Port Vale on 18 November 2006. He then scored twice and won a penalty in Swansea's 3–0 win over Premiership side Sheffield United in the 2006–07 FA Cup third round tie at Bramall Lane. In his first season, Butler made thirty-two appearances and scoring three goals in all competitions.

He started the 2007–08 season when he scored a brace, as Swansea City would beat Leyton Orient 5–0 on 6 October 2007. Butler would score four goals against Southend United on 16 December 2007, Swindon Town on 1 January 2008, Crewe and Luton Town. At the end of the 2007–08 season, Butler signed a long-term contract.

In 2008–09 season, Butler made thirty-two appearances in all competitions and scoring once against Southampton, as well as providing assist, which Swansea City won 3–0 on 25 October 2008. His 2008–09 season was disrupted with a hamstring injury and despite not playing in the South Wales derby on 5 April 2009, Butler was sent-off after the final whistle when he was arguing with the official over the penalty decision to Cardiff City, allowing them to equalise. After this, Butler was suspended for three match.

Butler missed the first seven matches of the 2009–10 season due to a hernia injury and made his return in mid-September 2009. Butler scored his first goal of the season, as Swansea City beat Sheffield United on 26 September 2009. At the end of the 2009–10 season, Butler signed a one-year contract with the club after they decided to trigger his extension. Butler would make twenty-five appearances and score once.

However, in 2010–11, under manager Brendan Rodgers, Butler had yet to make an appearance under him and after an operation, Butler would be out for a long time until 2011 with a thigh injury. During the season, Butler had to go rehabilitation and even went to the specialist to sort out his injuries.

In January 2012, Rodgers offered Butler (along with David Cotterill and Andrea Orlandi) to join Dutch side ADO Den Haag on loan as their first team is limited. Swansea City announced on 20 January 2012 that Butler has been released from his contract by mutual consent, he signed a one-year contract in August 2011, but never made an appearance for Swansea in the Premier League.

=== Alnwick Town ===
In December 2015, Butler signed for Northern League Division Two side Alnwick Town, agreeing to sign for new manager and Newcastle United Women's colleague Adam Laidlaw. Butler made his debut for the club in a 4–1 defeat to league leaders South Shields at Mariners Park, coming up against former Sunderland team-mate Julio Arca in the game.

=== Post Playing career ===
After spending seven months searching for the club since being released, Butler call the end of his career, citing his persistent thigh injury. Butler took over as manager of FA Women's Premier League side Newcastle United Women in the summer of 2015.

== Career statistics ==
=== Club ===
Appearances and goals by club, season and competition
Club	Season	League			FA Cup		League Cup		Other		Total	
Club	Season	Division	Apps	Goals	Apps	Goals	Apps	Goals	Apps	Goals	Apps	Goals
Sunderland	1999–2000	Premier League	1	0	0	0	1	0	0	0	2	0
Sunderland	2000–01	Premier League	4	0	0	0	1	0	0	0	5	0
Sunderland	2001–02	Premier League	7	0	0	0	0	0	0	0	7	0
Sunderland	2002–03	Premier League	7	0	0	0	1	0	0	0	8	0
Sunderland	2003–04	First Division	12	0	1	0	1	0	0	0	14	0
Sunderland	Total		31	0	1	0	4	0	0	0	36	0
Darlington (loan)	2000–01	Division Three	8	0	2	0	0	0	0	0	10	0
Dunfermline Athletic	2004–05	Scottish Premier League	12	0	0	0	2	0	0	0	14	0
Hartlepool United	2004–05	League One	9	1	0	0	0	0	2	0	11	1
Hartlepool United	2005–06	League One	28	1	2	1	2	0	1	0	33	2
Hartlepool United	Total		37	2	2	1	2	0	3	0	44	3
Swansea City	2006–07	League One	30	1	4	2	1	0	2	0	37	3
Swansea City	2007–08	League One	42	6	3	0	0	0	5	0	50	6
Swansea City	2008–09	Championship	29	1	2	0	1	0	0	0	32	1
Swansea City	2009–10	Championship	25	1	0	0	0	0	0	0	25	1
Swansea City	Total		126	9	9	2	2	0	7	0	144	11
Career total			214	11	14	3	10	0	10	0	248	14

=== International ===
Appearances and goals by national team and year
National team	Year	Apps	Goals
Republic of Ireland
Republic of Ireland	2002	2	0
Total		2	0

== Honours ==
Swansea City

- Football League One: 2007–08
