= Marcos Painter =

Association football player (born 1986)

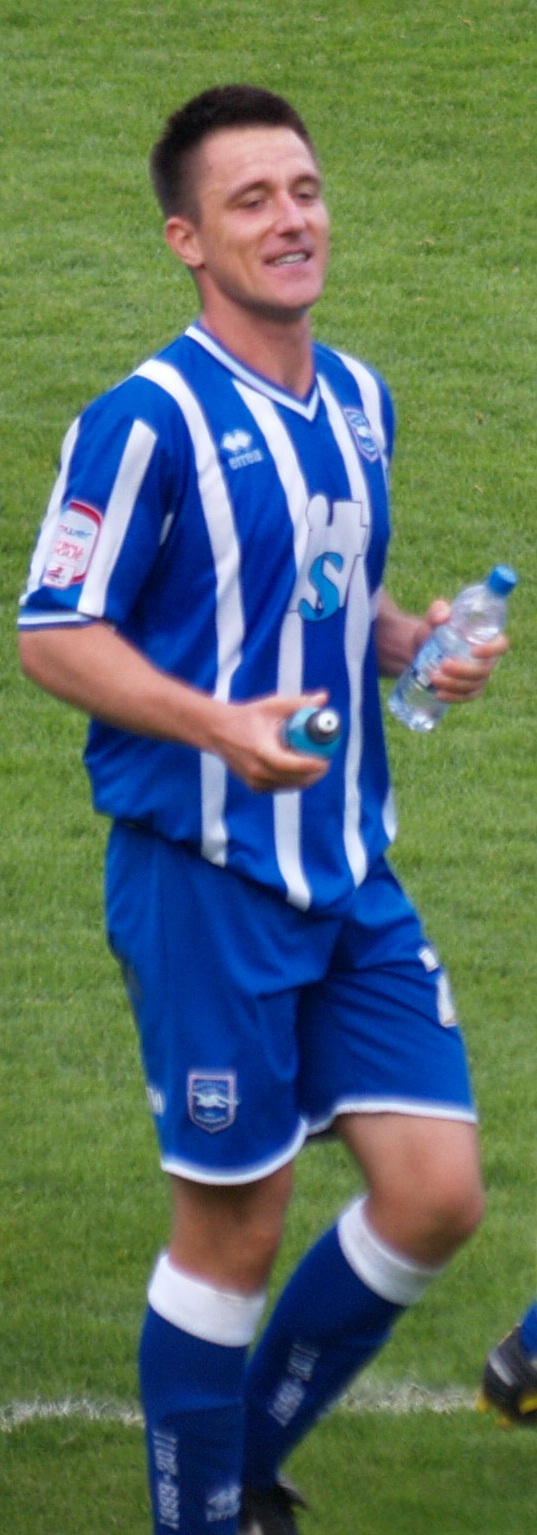
- In Brighton colours, April 2011

Personal information
- Full name: Marcos David Painter
- Date of birth: 17 August 1986 (age 40)
- Place of birth: Solihull, England
- Height: 6 ft 0 in (1.83 m)
- Position: Left back

Team information
- Current team: Birmingham City (under-21s assistant coach)

Youth career
- –2005: Birmingham City

Senior career*
Years	Team	Apps	(Gls)
2005–2007	Birmingham City	5	(0)
2006–2007	→ Swansea City (loan)	8	(0)
2007–2010	Swansea City	60	(0)
2010	→ Brighton & Hove Albion (loan)	19	(0)
2010–2013	Brighton & Hove Albion	71	(1)
2013	→ AFC Bournemouth (loan)	2	(0)
2013–2014	Portsmouth	17	(0)
Total		182	(1)

International career
2005–2007	Republic of Ireland U21		
- * Club domestic league appearances and goals

Marcos David Painter (born 17 August 1986) is a football coach and former professional player who played predominantly as a left back.

Painter started his professional career with Birmingham City in 2005, having progressed through the youth ranks at the club. He only made seven appearances for the club in a two-year spell, and moved to League One club Swansea City in November 2006, initially on loan, but on a permanent transfer in January 2007. He played 68 league games in three seasons for Swansea. He then spent three and a half years with Brighton & Hove Albion, for whom he played 90 league games, and had a brief loan spell with League One AFC Bournemouth in February 2013. Released at the end of the 2012–13 season, he signed for Portsmouth in August 2013.

He represented the Republic of Ireland at under-21 level.

== Career ==
=== Early career ===
Painter was born in Solihull and brought up in the Chelmsley Wood area, where he attended Archbishop Grimshaw secondary school. He came through the Birmingham City Academy.

Painter was handed a new one-year professional contract at the start of the 2005–06 season, and was involved with the first team during the club's pre-season tour of Norway. During a game against SK Brann, his tackle on Slovenian international, Fabijan Cipot, broke both bones of the player's lower leg. The tackle was described by Brann's manager as "a really bad tackle, a possible career-ender", though Birmingham manager Steve Bruce insisted it had not been deliberate. Painter received a yellow card and was immediately substituted. He made his competitive debut against Scunthorpe United in the League Cup in September 2005, and played his first game in the Premier League in the starting eleven as Birmingham beat Fulham 1–0 in December. He finished the season with nine appearances in all competitions.

=== Swansea City ===
At the beginning of the 2006–07 season, Painter played in one league and one cup game for Birmingham, then, in November 2006, he joined League One club Swansea City on a month's loan, to cover for the injured Tom Williams. The loan was extended to three months, and, after Birmingham manager Steve Bruce admitted that he could not guarantee Painter regular first-team football, the player moved permanently to Swansea on 31 January 2007, for an initial fee of £25,000 with a further £25,000 to be paid a year later. Swansea City would also pay an additional sum if promoted. He established himself as Swansea's first-choice left back, playing 31 league games as the club were promoted to the Championship, and was a regular selection at the higher level until, in October 2008, he sustained cruciate ligament damage in his right knee during a 3–0 win over Southampton. He did not feature for Swansea for the rest of the season.

=== Brighton & Hove Albion ===
Painter made only six appearances for Swansea in the first half of the 2009–10 season. In January 2010, he joined League One club Brighton & Hove Albion on loan until the end of the season, and then signed a two-year deal with the club to begin on 1 July when his Swansea contract expired. He scored his first career goal after 81 minutes of the League One match against Walsall on 28 August, which proved to be the winner.

On 15 February 2013, Painter joined League One club AFC Bournemouth on loan for the remainder of the season. After playing twice in a month for Bournemouth, he was recalled by Albion because of an injury to first-choice left back Wayne Bridge. He played twice more for Albion in what remained of the season, and was released when his contract expired.

=== Portsmouth ===
On 15 August, Painter joined Portsmouth of League Two on a short-term contract.

== Coaching career ==
After ending his playing career, Painter returned to Birmingham City as an academy coach, working with the under-16 team for nine years before being appointed assistant to under-21s coach Steve Spooner in October 2024.

== Career statistics ==
Club statistics
Club	Season	League			FA Cup		League Cup		Other		Total	
Club	Season	Division	Apps	Goals	Apps	Goals	Apps	Goals	Apps	Goals	Apps	Goals
Birmingham City	2005–06	Premier League	4	0	3	0	2	0	—		9	0
Birmingham City	2006–07	Championship	1	0	—		1	0	—		2	0
Birmingham City	Total		5	0	3	0	3	0	—		11	0
Swansea City	2006–07	League One	23	0	1	0	—		—		24	0
Swansea City	2007–08	League One	30	0	2	0	1	0	4 (Note: Appearance(s) in Football League Trophy)	0	37	0
Swansea City	2008–09	Championship	11	0	0	0	1	0	—		12	0
Swansea City	2009–10	Championship	4	0	1	0	1	0	—		6	0
Swansea City	Total		68	0	4	0	3	0	4	0	79	0
Brighton & Hove Albion (loan)	2009–10	League One	19	0	—		—		—		19	0
Brighton & Hove Albion	2010–11	League One	46	1	6	0	1	0	1	0	54	1
Brighton & Hove Albion	2011–12	Championship	20	0	0	0	2	0	—		22	0
Brighton & Hove Albion	2012–13	Championship	5	0	0	0	0	0	0	0	5	0
Brighton & Hove Albion	Total		90	1	6	0	3	0	1	0	100	1
AFC Bournemouth (loan)	2012–13	League One	2	0	—		—		—		2	0
Portsmouth	2013–14	League Two	17	0	0	0	0	0	1	0	18	0
Career total			182	1	13	0	9	0	6	0	210	1

== Honours ==
Swansea City

- Football League One: 2007–08

Brighton & Hove Albion

- Football League One: 2010–11
