= Michael van der Heijden =

Dutch footballer (born 1982)

Personal information
- Full name: Michael van der Heijden
- Date of birth: 10 March 1982 (age 44)
- Place of birth: The Hague, Netherlands
- Position: Midfielder

Senior career*
Years	Team	Apps	(Gls)
2000–2002	ADO Den Haag	34	(2)
2002–2005	RKC	0	(0)
2003–2004	→ Dordrecht (loan)	19	(3)
2005	Haarlem	10	(0)
2005–2006	Omniworld	33	(2)
2007–2009	Lisse		
2009–2010	Scheveningen		
2010–2013	Quick Boys		
- * Club domestic league appearances and goals as of 07:02, 18 July 2008 (UTC)

Michael van der Heijden (born 10 March 1982 in The Hague, Netherlands) is a Dutch retired footballer.

He had a trial at Swansea City in July 2008. Hereford United in League One attempted to sign him on loan in August, but this fell through.

In 2009, van der Heijden left Lisse for Scheveningen then moved to Quick Boys where he stayed until 2013.

== Personal life ==
Van der Heijden lives in Waddinxveen with his wife and three children. He runs a facilities management company there.
