= 2008–09 Football League Championship =

Football League Championship
- Season: 2008–09
- Champions: Wolverhampton Wanderers; 1st Championship title 3rd 2nd tier title
- Promoted: Wolverhampton Wanderers; Birmingham City; Burnley
- Relegated: Norwich City; Southampton; Charlton Athletic
- Matches: 552
- Goals: 1,350 (2.45 per match)
- Top goalscorer: Sylvan Ebanks-Blake (25 goals)
- Biggest home win: Reading 6–0 Sheffield Wednesday, Preston North End 6–0 Cardiff City
- Biggest away win: Charlton Athletic 2–5 Sheffield United
- Highest scoring: Norwich City 5–2 Wolverhampton Wanderers, Watford 3–4 Blackpool, Charlton Athletic 2–5 Sheffield United
- Longest winning run: 7 games Wolverhampton Wanderers (achieved twice)
- Longest unbeaten run: 13 games Cardiff City, Swansea City
- Longest winless run: 18 games Charlton Athletic
- Longest losing run: 6 games Doncaster Rovers
- Highest attendance: 33,079; Derby County v Wolverhampton Wanderers
- Lowest attendance: 6,648; Blackpool v Charlton Athletic
- Average attendance: 17,938

The 2008–09 Football League Championship (known as the Coca-Cola Championship for sponsorship reasons) was the sixth season of the league under its current title and seventeenth season under its current league division format.

Wolverhampton Wanderers won the division to return to the Premier League after a five-year absence. They secured the Championship title on 25 April, one week after having confirmed their promotion with a victory over QPR.

Birmingham City were promoted at the first attempt following their relegation. They secured their return to the top flight on the final day of the season by winning at promotion rivals Reading 2–1. Norwich City, Southampton and Charlton Athletic were relegated;

Burnley won the play-offs to reach the Premier League for the first time after a 1–0 win in the play-off final against Sheffield United, who had been in with a chance of automatic promotion on the final day.

== Team changes from previous season ==
Joining the Championship

Relegated from the Premier League:

- Reading
- Birmingham City
- Derby County

Promoted from League One:

- Swansea City
- Nottingham Forest
- Doncaster Rovers

Leaving the Championship

Promoted to the Premier League:

- West Bromwich Albion
- Stoke City
- Hull City

Relegated to League One:

- Leicester City
- Scunthorpe United
- Colchester United

== Team overview ==
=== Stadium and locations ===
Locations of the Championship 2008–09 teams

| Team | Stadium | Capacity |
|---|---|---|
| Barnsley | Oakwell | 23,009 |
| Birmingham City | St Andrew's | 30,009 |
| Blackpool | Bloomfield Road | 9,788 |
| Bristol City | Ashton Gate | 21,497 |
| Burnley | Turf Moor | 22,546 |
| Cardiff City | Ninian Park | 22,008 |
| Charlton Athletic | The Valley | 27,111 |
| Coventry City | Ricoh Arena | 32,609 |
| Crystal Palace | Selhurst Park | 26,309 |
| Derby County | Pride Park | 33,597 |
| Doncaster Rovers | Keepmoat Stadium | 15,231 |
| Ipswich Town | Portman Road | 30,311 |
| Norwich City | Carrow Road | 26,034 |
| Nottingham Forest | City Ground | 30,602 |
| Plymouth Argyle | Home Park | 19,500 |
| Preston North End | Deepdale | 24,500 |
| Queens Park Rangers | Loftus Road | 19,128 |
| Reading | Madejski Stadium | 24,161 |
| Sheffield United | Bramall Lane | 32,609 |
| Sheffield Wednesday | Hillsborough | 39,814 |
| Southampton | St Mary's Stadium | 32,689 |
| Swansea City | Liberty Stadium | 20,532 |
| Watford | Vicarage Road | 19,920 |
| Wolverhampton Wanderers | Molineux | 28,525 |

=== Personnel and sponsoring ===
| Team | Manager | Kit maker | Sponsor |
|---|---|---|---|
| Barnsley | (Wales) Simon Davey | Lotto | Barnsley Building Society |
| Birmingham City | (Scotland) Alex McLeish | Umbro | F&C Investments |
| Blackpool | (England) Ian Holloway | Carlotti | Floors 2 Go/Carbrini |
| Bristol City | (England) Gary Johnson | Puma | DAS Group |
| Burnley | (Scotland) Owen Coyle | Erreà | Holland's Pies |
| Cardiff City | (England) Dave Jones | Joma | Vansdirect.co.uk |
| Charlton Athletic | (England) Phil Parkinson | Joma | Carbrini |
| Coventry City | (Wales) Chris Coleman | Puma | Cassidy Group (H)/StadiArena (A) |
| Crystal Palace | (England) Neil Warnock | Erreà | GAC Logistics |
| Derby County | (England) Nigel Clough | Adidas | Bombardier |
| Doncaster Rovers | (Republic of Ireland) Sean O'Driscoll | Vandanel | Wright Investments |
| Ipswich Town | (Republic of Ireland) Roy Keane | Mitre | Marcus Evans |
| Norwich City | (Scotland) Bryan Gunn | Xara | Aviva |
| Nottingham Forest | (Scotland) Billy Davies | Umbro | Capital One |
| Plymouth Argyle | (Scotland) Paul Sturrock | Puma | Ginsters |
| Preston North End | (Scotland) Alan Irvine | Diadora | Enterprise plc |
| Queens Park Rangers | (Northern Ireland) Jim Magilton | Lotto | Gulf Air |
| Reading | (England) Steve Coppell | Puma | Waitrose |
| Sheffield United | (England) Kevin Blackwell | Le Coq Sportif | VisitMalta.com |
| Sheffield Wednesday | (England) Brian Laws | Lotto | PlusNet |
| Southampton | (Netherlands) Mark Wotte | Umbro | Flybe |
| Swansea City | (Spain) Roberto Martínez | Umbro | Swansea.com |
| Watford | (Northern Ireland) Brendan Rodgers | Diadora | Beko |
| Wolverhampton Wanderers | (Republic of Ireland) Mick McCarthy | Le Coq Sportif | Chaucer Consulting |

==== Managerial changes ====
| Team | Outgoing manager | Manner of departure | Date of vacancy | Replaced by | Date of appointment | Position in table |
|---|---|---|---|---|---|---|
| QPR | (Northern Ireland) Iain Dowie | Sacked | 24 October 2008 | (Portugal) Paulo Sousa | 19 November 2008 | 9th |
| Watford | (England) Aidy Boothroyd | Mutual consent | 3 November 2008 | (Northern Ireland) Brendan Rodgers | 24 November 2008 | 21st |
| Charlton Athletic | (England) Alan Pardew | Mutual consent | 22 November 2008 | (England) Phil Parkinson | 31 December 2008 | 22nd |
| Blackpool | (England) Simon Grayson | Signed by Leeds United | 23 December 2008 | (England) Ian Holloway | 21 May 2009 | 16th |
| Nottingham Forest | (Scotland) Colin Calderwood | Sacked | 26 December 2008 | (Scotland) Billy Davies | 1 January 2009 | 22nd |
| Derby County | (England) Paul Jewell | Resigned | 28 December 2008 | (England) Nigel Clough | 6 January 2009 | 18th |
| Norwich City | (England) Glenn Roeder | Sacked | 14 January 2009 | (Scotland) Bryan Gunn | 21 January 2009 | 21st |
| Southampton | (Netherlands) Jan Poortvliet | Resigned | 23 January 2009 | (Netherlands) Mark Wotte | 23 January 2009 | 23rd |
| QPR | (Portugal) Paulo Sousa | Sacked | 9 April 2009 | (Northern Ireland) Jim Magilton | 3 June 2009 | 10th |
| Ipswich Town | (Northern Ireland) Jim Magilton | Sacked | 22 April 2009 | (Republic of Ireland) Roy Keane | 23 April 2009 | 9th |
| Reading | (England) Steve Coppell | Resigned | 12 May 2009 | (Northern Ireland) Brendan Rodgers | 4 June 2009 | 4th, Play-off semi-final |

== League table ==
| Pos | Team | Pld | W | D | L | GF | GA | GD | Pts | Promotion, qualification or relegation |
|---|---|---|---|---|---|---|---|---|---|---|
| 1 | Wolverhampton Wanderers (C, P) | 46 | 27 | 9 | 10 | 80 | 52 | +28 | 90 | Promotion to the Premier League |
| 2 | Birmingham City (P) | 46 | 23 | 14 | 9 | 54 | 37 | +17 | 83 | Promotion to the Premier League |
| 3 | Sheffield United | 46 | 22 | 14 | 10 | 64 | 39 | +25 | 80 | Qualification for Championship play-offs |
| 4 | Reading | 46 | 21 | 14 | 11 | 72 | 40 | +32 | 77 | Qualification for Championship play-offs |
| 5 | Burnley (O, P) | 46 | 21 | 13 | 12 | 72 | 60 | +12 | 76 | Qualification for Championship play-offs |
| 6 | Preston North End | 46 | 21 | 11 | 14 | 66 | 54 | +12 | 74 | Qualification for Championship play-offs |
| 7 | Cardiff City | 46 | 19 | 17 | 10 | 65 | 53 | +12 | 74 | |
| 8 | Swansea City | 46 | 16 | 20 | 10 | 63 | 50 | +13 | 68 | |
| 9 | Ipswich Town | 46 | 17 | 15 | 14 | 62 | 53 | +9 | 66 | |
| 10 | Bristol City | 46 | 15 | 16 | 15 | 54 | 54 | 0 | 61 | |
| 11 | Queens Park Rangers | 46 | 15 | 16 | 15 | 42 | 44 | −2 | 61 | |
| 12 | Sheffield Wednesday | 46 | 16 | 13 | 17 | 51 | 58 | −7 | 61 | |
| 13 | Watford | 46 | 16 | 10 | 20 | 68 | 72 | −4 | 58 | |
| 14 | Doncaster Rovers | 46 | 17 | 7 | 22 | 42 | 53 | −11 | 58 | |
| 15 | Crystal Palace | 46 | 15 | 12 | 19 | 52 | 55 | −3 | 56 (Note: Crystal Palace were give a one-point deduction for using an ineligible player during a match against Sheffield United on 3 May 2009.) | |
| 16 | Blackpool | 46 | 13 | 17 | 16 | 47 | 58 | −11 | 56 | |
| 17 | Coventry City | 46 | 13 | 15 | 18 | 47 | 58 | −11 | 54 | |
| 18 | Derby County | 46 | 14 | 12 | 20 | 55 | 67 | −12 | 54 | |
| 19 | Nottingham Forest | 46 | 13 | 14 | 19 | 50 | 65 | −15 | 53 | |
| 20 | Barnsley | 46 | 13 | 13 | 20 | 45 | 58 | −13 | 52 | |
| 21 | Plymouth Argyle | 46 | 13 | 12 | 21 | 44 | 57 | −13 | 51 | |
| 22 | Norwich City (R) | 46 | 12 | 10 | 24 | 57 | 70 | −13 | 46 | Relegation to Football League One |
| 23 | Southampton (R) | 46 | 10 | 15 | 21 | 46 | 69 | −23 | 45 (Note: Southampton were given a ten-point deduction for breaching insolvency regulations, regarding their holding company. As they finished in the bottom three in the 2008–09 season, the points deduction was applied during the 2009–10 season in League One.) | Relegation to Football League One |
| 24 | Charlton Athletic (R) | 46 | 8 | 15 | 23 | 52 | 74 | −22 | 39 | Relegation to Football League One |

Updated to match(es) played on 3 May 2009. Source: The Football League
Rules for classification: 1) points; 2) goal difference; 3) number of goals scored.
(C) Champions; (O) Play-off winners; (P) Promoted; (R) Relegated

=== Play-offs ===
Semi-finals
3 | Sheffield United | 1 | 1 | 2
6 | Preston North End | 1 | 0 | 1
4 | Reading | 0 | 0 | 0
5 | Burnley | 1 | 2 | 3

Final
3 | Sheffield United | 0
5 | Burnley | 1

== Results ==
| Home \ Away | BAR | BIR | BLP | BRI | BUR | CAR | CHA | COV | CRY | DER | DON | IPS | NWC | NOT | PLY | PNE | QPR | REA | SHU | SHW | SOU | SWA | WAT | WOL |
|---|---|---|---|---|---|---|---|---|---|---|---|---|---|---|---|---|---|---|---|---|---|---|---|---|
| Barnsley | | 1–1 | 0–1 | 0–0 | 3–2 | 0–1 | 0–0 | 1–2 | 3–1 | 2–0 | 4–1 | 1–2 | 0–0 | 1–1 | 2–0 | 1–1 | 2–1 | 0–1 | 1–2 | 2–1 | 0–1 | 1–3 | 2–1 | 1–1 |
| Birmingham City | 2–0 | | 0–1 | 1–0 | 1–1 | 1–1 | 3–2 | 0–1 | 1–0 | 1–0 | 1–0 | 2–1 | 1–1 | 2–0 | 1–1 | 1–2 | 1–0 | 1–3 | 1–0 | 3–1 | 1–0 | 0–0 | 3–2 | 2–0 |
| Blackpool | 1–0 | 2–0 | | 0–1 | 0–1 | 1–1 | 2–0 | 1–1 | 2–2 | 3–2 | 2–3 | 0–1 | 2–0 | 1–1 | 0–1 | 1–3 | 0–3 | 2–2 | 1–3 | 0–2 | 1–1 | 1–1 | 0–2 | 2–2 |
| Bristol City | 2–0 | 1–2 | 0–0 | | 1–2 | 1–1 | 2–1 | 2–0 | 1–0 | 1–1 | 4–1 | 1–1 | 1–0 | 2–2 | 2–2 | 1–1 | 1–1 | 1–4 | 0–0 | 1–1 | 2–0 | 0–0 | 1–1 | 2–2 |
| Burnley | 1–2 | 1–1 | 2–0 | 4–0 | | 2–2 | 2–1 | 1–1 | 4–2 | 3–0 | 0–0 | 0–3 | 2–0 | 5–0 | 0–0 | 3–1 | 1–0 | 1–0 | 1–0 | 2–4 | 3–2 | 0–2 | 3–2 | 1–0 |
| Cardiff City | 3–1 | 1–2 | 2–0 | 0–0 | 3–1 | | 2–0 | 2–1 | 2–1 | 4–1 | 3–0 | 0–3 | 2–2 | 2–0 | 1–0 | 2–0 | 0–0 | 2–2 | 0–3 | 2–0 | 2–1 | 2–2 | 2–1 | 1–2 |
| Charlton Athletic | 1–3 | 0–0 | 2–2 | 0–2 | 1–1 | 2–2 | | 1–2 | 1–0 | 2–2 | 1–2 | 2–1 | 4–2 | 0–2 | 2–0 | 0–0 | 2–2 | 4–2 | 2–5 | 1–2 | 0–0 | 2–0 | 2–3 | 1–3 |
| Coventry City | 1–1 | 1–0 | 2–1 | 0–3 | 1–3 | 0–2 | 0–0 | | 0–2 | 1–1 | 1–0 | 2–2 | 2–0 | 2–2 | 0–1 | 0–0 | 1–0 | 0–0 | 1–2 | 2–0 | 4–1 | 1–1 | 2–3 | 2–1 |
| Crystal Palace | 3–0 | 0–0 | 0–1 | 4–2 | 0–0 | 0–2 | 1–0 | 1–1 | | 1–0 | 2–1 | 1–4 | 3–1 | 1–2 | 1–2 | 2–1 | 0–0 | 0–0 | 0–0 | 1–1 | 3–0 | 2–0 | 0–0 | 0–1 |
| Derby County | 0–0 | 1–1 | 4–1 | 2–1 | 1–1 | 1–1 | 1–0 | 2–1 | 1–2 | | 0–1 | 0–1 | 3–1 | 1–1 | 2–1 | 2–2 | 0–2 | 0–2 | 2–1 | 3–0 | 0–1 | 2–2 | 1–0 | 2–3 |
| Doncaster Rovers | 0–1 | 0–2 | 0–0 | 1–0 | 2–1 | 1–1 | 0–1 | 1–0 | 2–0 | 2–1 | | 1–0 | 1–1 | 0–0 | 1–0 | 0–2 | 2–0 | 0–1 | 0–2 | 1–0 | 0–2 | 0–0 | 1–2 | 0–1 |
| Ipswich Town | 3–0 | 0–1 | 1–1 | 3–1 | 1–1 | 1–2 | 1–1 | 2–1 | 1–1 | 2–0 | 1–3 | | 3–2 | 2–1 | 0–0 | 1–2 | 2–0 | 2–0 | 1–1 | 1–1 | 0–3 | 2–2 | 0–0 | 0–2 |
| Norwich City | 4–0 | 1–1 | 1–1 | 1–2 | 1–1 | 2–0 | 1–0 | 1–2 | 1–2 | 1–2 | 2–1 | 2–0 | | 2–3 | 1–0 | 2–2 | 0–1 | 0–2 | 1–0 | 0–1 | 2–2 | 2–3 | 2–0 | 5–2 |
| Nottingham Forest | 1–0 | 1–1 | 0–0 | 3–2 | 1–2 | 0–1 | 0–0 | 1–0 | 0–2 | 1–3 | 2–4 | 1–1 | 1–2 | | 2–0 | 2–1 | 2–2 | 0–0 | 0–1 | 2–1 | 3–1 | 1–1 | 3–2 | 0–1 |
| Plymouth Argyle | 1–2 | 0–1 | 1–2 | 0–2 | 1–2 | 2–1 | 2–2 | 4–0 | 1–3 | 0–3 | 0–3 | 1–3 | 1–2 | 1–0 | | 1–0 | 1–1 | 2–2 | 2–2 | 4–0 | 2–0 | 0–1 | 2–1 | 2–2 |
| Preston North End | 2–1 | 1–0 | 0–1 | 2–0 | 2–1 | 6–0 | 2–1 | 2–1 | 2–0 | 2–0 | 1–0 | 3–2 | 1–0 | 2–1 | 1–1 | | 2–1 | 2–1 | 0–0 | 1–1 | 2–3 | 0–2 | 2–0 | 1–3 |
| Queens Park Rangers | 2–1 | 1–0 | 1–1 | 2–1 | 1–2 | 1–0 | 2–1 | 1–1 | 0–0 | 0–2 | 2–0 | 1–3 | 0–1 | 2–1 | 0–0 | 3–2 | | 0–0 | 0–0 | 3–2 | 4–1 | 1–0 | 0–0 | 1–0 |
| Reading | 0–0 | 1–2 | 1–0 | 0–2 | 3–1 | 1–1 | 2–2 | 3–1 | 4–2 | 3–0 | 2–1 | 0–1 | 2–0 | 0–1 | 2–0 | 0–0 | 0–0 | | 0–1 | 6–0 | 1–2 | 4–0 | 4–0 | 1–0 |
| Sheffield United | 2–1 | 2–1 | 2–2 | 3–0 | 2–3 | 0–0 | 3–1 | 1–1 | 2–2 | 4–2 | 0–1 | 2–0 | 1–0 | 0–0 | 2–0 | 1–0 | 3–0 | 0–2 | | 1–2 | 0–0 | 1–0 | 2–1 | 1–3 |
| Sheffield Wednesday | 0–1 | 1–1 | 1–1 | 0–0 | 4–1 | 1–0 | 4–1 | 0–1 | 2–0 | 0–1 | 1–0 | 0–0 | 3–2 | 1–0 | 0–1 | 1–1 | 1–0 | 1–2 | 1–0 | | 2–0 | 0–0 | 2–0 | 0–1 |
| Southampton | 0–0 | 1–2 | 0–1 | 0–1 | 2–2 | 1–0 | 2–3 | 1–1 | 1–0 | 1–1 | 1–2 | 2–2 | 2–0 | 0–2 | 0–0 | 3–1 | 0–0 | 1–1 | 1–2 | 1–1 | | 2–2 | 0–3 | 1–2 |
| Swansea City | 2–2 | 2–3 | 0–1 | 1–0 | 1–1 | 2–2 | 1–1 | 0–0 | 1–3 | 1–1 | 3–1 | 3–0 | 2–1 | 3–1 | 1–0 | 4–1 | 0–0 | 2–0 | 1–1 | 1–1 | 3–0 | | 3–1 | 3–1 |
| Watford | 1–1 | 0–1 | 3–4 | 2–4 | 3–0 | 2–2 | 1–0 | 2–1 | 2–0 | 3–1 | 1–1 | 2–1 | 2–1 | 2–1 | 1–2 | 2–1 | 3–0 | 2–2 | 0–2 | 2–2 | 2–2 | 2–0 | | 2–3 |
| Wolverhampton Wanderers | 2–0 | 1–1 | 2–0 | 2–0 | 2–0 | 2–2 | 2–1 | 2–1 | 2–1 | 3–0 | 1–0 | 0–0 | 3–3 | 5–1 | 0–1 | 1–3 | 1–0 | 0–3 | 1–1 | 4–1 | 3–0 | 2–1 | 3–1 | |

Source: The Football League
Legend: Blue = home team win; Yellow = draw; Red = away team win.

== Top goalscorers ==
| Pos | Player | Team | Goals |
|---|---|---|---|
| 1 | (England) Sylvan Ebanks-Blake | Wolverhampton Wanderers | 25 |
| 2 | (Scotland) Ross McCormack | Cardiff City | 21 |
| 2 | (Trinidad and Tobago) Jason Scotland | Swansea City | 21 |
| 4 | (Republic of Ireland) Kevin Doyle | Reading | 18 |
| 5 | (England) Tommy Smith | Watford | 16 |
| 6 | (England) Rob Hulse | Derby County | 14 |
| 6 | (Scotland) Chris Iwelumo | Wolverhampton Wanderers | 14 |
| 6 | (England) Marcus Tudgay | Sheffield Wednesday | 14 |
| 6 | (England) Kevin Phillips | Birmingham City | 14 |

== Awards ==
| Month | Manager of the Month | | Player of the Month | | Notes |
| Month | Manager | Club | Player | Club | Notes |
|---|---|---|---|---|---|
| August | (Republic of Ireland) Mick McCarthy | Wolverhampton Wanderers | (England) Richard Chaplow | Preston North End | |
| September | (Republic of Ireland) Owen Coyle | Burnley | (Republic of Ireland) Kevin Doyle | Reading | |
| October | (England) Dave Jones | Cardiff City | (England) Rob Hulse | Derby County | |
| November | (Republic of Ireland) Mick McCarthy | Wolverhampton Wanderers | (Scotland) Chris Iwelumo | Wolverhampton Wanderers | |
| December | (England) Steve Coppell | Reading | (Republic of Ireland) Stephen Hunt | Reading | |
| January | (Spain) Roberto Martínez | Swansea City | (Wales) Joe Ledley | Cardiff City | |
| February | (Wales) Chris Coleman | Coventry City | (Trinidad and Tobago) Jason Scotland | Swansea City | |
| March | (England) Kevin Blackwell | Sheffield United | (England) Robbie Blake | Burnley | |
| April | (Scotland) Alan Irvine | Preston North End | (England) Kyle Naughton | Sheffield United | |

PFA Team of the Year

| Pos. | Player | Club |
|---|---|---|
| GK | (Republic of Ireland) Keiren Westwood | Coventry City |
| DF | (England) Kyle Naughton | Sheffield United |
| DF | (England) Roger Johnson | Cardiff City |
| DF | (England) Richard Stearman | Wolverhampton Wanderers |
| DF | (Scotland) Danny Fox | Coventry City |
| MF | (England) Michael Kightly | Wolverhampton Wanderers |
| MF | (Republic of Ireland) Stephen Hunt | Reading |
| MF | (Wales) Joe Ledley | Cardiff City |
| MF | (Spain) Jordi Gómez | Swansea City |
| FW | (England) Sylvan Ebanks-Blake | Wolverhampton Wanderers |
| FW | (Trinidad and Tobago) Jason Scotland | Swansea City |

== Events ==
=== Goal controversies ===
- On 20 September 2008, during Watford's home game against Reading, the assistant referee Nigel Banister adjudged that a John Eustace own goal had opened the scoring for Reading. In fact, the ball had gone four yards wide of the goal after Eustace challenged Royals forward Noel Hunt and a corner should therefore have been awarded. Referee Stuart Attwell followed the signal by the assistant and awarded the goal. The next day Reading manager Steve Coppell said that he was happy for the game to be replayed, but his offer was turned down when an official said, "the referee's decision is final."
- On 6 December 2008 an apparent Bristol City goal against Swansea City was not awarded after both the linesman and referee failed to see the ball cross the line. This led Bristol City manager Gary Johnson to add to calls for goal-line technology.

=== Southampton administration ===
On 23 April 2009, The Football League announced that Southampton had been placed into administration. The ruling occurred after the deadline for immediate points deduction application, so the ten-point deduction would have to await whether or not Southampton, in 22nd place at the time of the announcement, were relegated. If they had finished above the relegation zone, then the points would have been deducted from their total for the current year to thereby relegate them. However, since their relegation was confirmed following their penultimate match, their point penalty would be applied the next season in League One.

== Attendances ==
| No. | Club | Average | Change | Highest | Lowest |
|---|---|---|---|---|---|
| 1 | Derby County | 29,440 | -9.2% | 33,079 | 25,534 |
| 2 | Sheffield United | 26,023 | 1.5% | 30,786 | 23,045 |
| 3 | Norwich City | 24,543 | 0.1% | 25,487 | 23,225 |
| 4 | Wolverhampton Wanderers | 24,153 | 2.8% | 28,252 | 21,326 |
| 5 | Nottingham Forest | 22,299 | 11.7% | 29,140 | 17,568 |
| 6 | Sheffield Wednesday | 21,542 | 0.6% | 30,658 | 14,792 |
| 7 | Ipswich Town | 20,961 | -4.4% | 28,274 | 17,749 |
| 8 | Charlton Athletic | 20,894 | -9.8% | 24,553 | 19,215 |
| 9 | Reading | 19,936 | -15.5% | 23,879 | 16,514 |
| 10 | Birmingham City | 19,081 | -27.1% | 25,935 | 15,330 |
| 11 | Cardiff City | 18,044 | 29.4% | 20,156 | 15,902 |
| 12 | Southampton | 17,849 | -16.0% | 27,228 | 13,257 |
| 13 | Coventry City | 17,408 | -9.0% | 22,637 | 14,621 |
| 14 | Bristol City | 16,816 | 3.3% | 18,456 | 15,304 |
| 15 | Crystal Palace | 15,220 | -5.1% | 22,824 | 12,847 |
| 16 | Swansea City | 15,187 | 12.3% | 18,053 | 11,442 |
| 17 | Watford | 14,858 | -12.0% | 16,386 | 13,193 |
| 18 | Queens Park Rangers | 14,090 | 0.9% | 17,120 | 12,286 |
| 19 | Preston North End | 13,426 | 6.2% | 21,273 | 10,558 |
| 20 | Barnsley | 13,189 | 15.4% | 19,681 | 10,678 |
| 21 | Burnley | 13,082 | 5.8% | 18,005 | 10,032 |
| 22 | Doncaster Rovers | 11,964 | 50.0% | 14,823 | 9,534 |
| 23 | Plymouth Argyle | 11,427 | -12.1% | 14,789 | 9,203 |
| 24 | Blackpool | 7,843 | -11.5% | 9,643 | 6,648 |
