= Andrea Orlandi =

Spanish former footballer (born 1984)

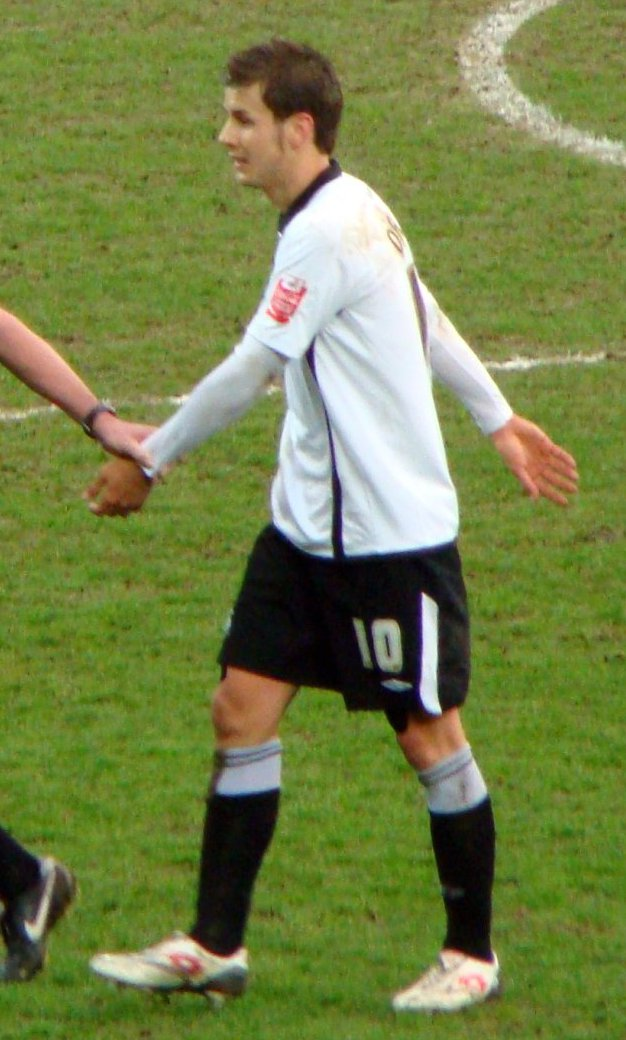
- Orlandi in action for Swansea in 2010

Personal information
- Full name: Andrea Orlandi Stabilin
- Date of birth: 3 August 1984 (age 42)
- Place of birth: Barcelona, Spain
- Height: 1.83 m (6 ft 0 in)
- Positions: Winger; attacking midfielder

Youth career
- Damm
- 2002–2003: Alavés

Senior career*
Years	Team	Apps	(Gls)
2003–2005	Alavés B	58	(8)
2003–2007	Alavés	2	(0)
2005–2007	→ Barcelona B (loan)	67	(5)
2006	→ Barcelona (loan)	1	(0)
2007–2012	Swansea City	72	(3)
2012–2014	Brighton & Hove Albion	49	(6)
2014–2015	Blackpool	28	(4)
2015–2016	Anorthosis	27	(4)
2016–2017	APOEL	9	(0)
2017–2018	Novara	42	(1)
2018–2019	Chennaiyin	9	(0)
2019	Virtus Entella	0	(0)
Total		364	(31)
- * Club domestic league appearances and goals

Andrea Orlandi Stabilin (born 3 August 1984) is a Spanish former footballer and who played as a winger or an attacking midfielder. He currently works as a scout as well as a pundit for LaLiga+ and Spanish outlet La Media Inglesa, specialized on English football.

After playing as a youth with Alavés, he went to spend the vast majority of his professional career in the United Kingdom, starting out at Swansea City in 2007.

== Club career ==
=== Spain ===
Born in Barcelona, Catalonia, Orlandi started his senior career with Deportivo Alavés, only managing three competitive appearances for the first team during his two-year spell, with the Basques in Segunda División. In summer 2005 he was loaned to hometown side FC Barcelona, also being almost exclusively associated with the reserves.

On 20 May 2006, as Barça were already crowned champions, Orlandi took part in his first – and only – La Liga match with the Catalans' main squad, pitching in at left back in a 1–3 away loss against Athletic Bilbao. He also played once in the club's Copa Catalunya win over RCD Espanyol in June 2007, under manager Frank Rijkaard.

=== Swansea City ===
In late September 2007, after an unsuccessful trial with Aris Thessaloniki FC, free agent Orlandi signed for Swansea City, moving to the Liberty Stadium on a one-year deal as the club was managed by his compatriot Roberto Martínez. In July 2010 he was linked to fellow Football League Championship side Leicester City, who had just appointed former Swans boss Paulo Sousa as their new coach, but nothing came of it, and the player renewed his link for a further two years, having done the same the year before.

On 4 July 2011, after having helped Swansea to its first-ever promotion to the Premier League, contributing 20 games to this feat, Orlandi penned a new one-year contract extension with the club. After signing, however, he found opportunities limited in Brendan Rodgers' first team and, on 2 January 2012, was offered to ADO Den Haag on a temporary basis alongside Thomas Butler and David Cotterill; both Butler and Cotterill were subsequently released from their contracts, with Orlandi opting to remain with the Welsh until the end of the season.

Orlandi scored the fastest Premier League goal in five years on 28 April 2012, with a diving header from a Scott Sinclair cross after just 25 seconds. Swansea drew the game 4–4 against Wolverhampton Wanderers, who had already been relegated.

=== Brighton & Hove Albion ===
Orlandi transferred to Brighton & Hove Albion on 31 August 2012, signing a two-year deal. He scored his first goal for his new team on 27 November, helping to a 2–0 home league win over Bristol City. His second came on 5 January 2013, in an eventual elimination of Newcastle United from the FA Cup (same result).

Appearances in the 2013–14 campaign were limited for Orlandi, and he was released at its closure. He subsequently stated his disappointment for leaving, mentioning his child had been born in Brighton.

=== Blackpool ===
On 1 August 2014, Orlandi agreed a one-year contract with the option of a further year with Blackpool also in the English second tier, after five days of talks. He was featured in a pre-season friendly against Burnley the following day, alongside eight other triallists; however, the deal was not made official until 8 August, ahead of the season opener against Nottingham Forest, and he made his competitive debut precisely in that match, starting and being booked in a 0–2 away loss.

=== Anorthosis ===
Orlandi joined Cypriot club Anorthosis Famagusta F.C. on 31 August 2015 on a one-year deal, with the option of a second year. He made his debut on 13 September, in a 3–0 home defeat of Ethnikos Achna FC for the Cypriot First Division.

=== APOEL ===
On 8 June 2016, Orlandi signed a one-year deal with reigning Cypriot champions APOEL FC. He made his competitive debut on 12 July, coming on as a 71st-minute substitute in a 0–0 away draw against The New Saints F.C. in the second qualifying round of the UEFA Champions League. He scored his first goal for his new team on 18 January 2017, netting the winner in a 2–1 home victory over Nea Salamis Famagusta FC in the domestic cup.

Orlandi's contract was terminated on 30 January 2017.

=== Later years ===
On 6 August 2018, Orlandi joined Indian Super League franchise Chennaiyin FC after a two-year stint with Novara Calcio in the Serie B. He returned to Italy in January 2019, signing with Serie C club Virtus Entella. The following month, however, he was diagnosed with a previously undetected cardiac pathology, and retired with immediate effect.

== Club statistics ==
As of match played on 1 May 2018

Club	Season	League			Cup		Continental		Other		Total	
Club	Season	Division	Apps	Goals	Apps	Goals	Apps	Goals	Apps	Goals	Apps	Goals
Alavés B	2002–03	Segunda División B	5	0	—		—		—		5	0
Alavés B	2003–04	Segunda División B	30	5	—		—		—		30	5
Alavés B	2004–05	Segunda División B	23	3	—		—		—		23	3
Alavés B	Total		58	8	—		—		—		58	8
Alavés	2003–04	Segunda División	2	0	1	0	—		—		3	0
Barcelona B (loan)	2005–06	Segunda División B	32	4	—		—		—		32	4
Barcelona B (loan)	2006–07	Segunda División B	35	1	—		—		—		35	1
Barcelona B (loan)	Total		67	5	—		—		—		67	5
Barcelona (loan)	2005–06	La Liga	1	0	0	0	0 (Note: Appearances in UEFA Champions League)	0	—		1	0
Swansea City	2007–08	League One	8	0	4	0	—		3 (Note: Appearances in Football League Trophy)	0	15	0
Swansea City	2008–09	Championship	11	1	4	0	—		—		15	1
Swansea City	2009–10	Championship	30	1	1	0	—		—		31	1
Swansea City	2010–11	Championship	20	0	4	0	—		—		24	0
Swansea City	2011–12	Premier League	3	1	2	0	—		—		5	1
Swansea City	Total		72	3	15	0	—		3	0	90	3
Brighton & Hove Albion	2012–13	Championship	35	6	1	0	—		2 (Note: Appearances in Promotion Play-offs)	0	38	6
Brighton & Hove Albion	2013–14	Championship	14	0	2	0	—		2	0	18	0
Brighton & Hove Albion	Total		49	6	3	0	—		4	0	56	6
Blackpool	2014–15	Championship	28	4	2	0	—		—		30	4
Anorthosis	2015–16	Cypriot First Division	27	4	3	0	—		—		30	4
APOEL	2016–17	Cypriot First Division	9	0	1	1	8 (Note: Appearances in UEFA Champions League and UEFA Europa League)	0	1 (Note: Appearances in Cypriot Super Cup)	0	19	1
Novara	2016–17	Serie B	12	1	0	0	—		—		12	1
Novara	2017–18	Serie B	28	0	1	0	—		—		29	0
Novara	Total		30	1	1	0	—		—		31	1
Career total			353	31	23	1	8	0	8	0	392	32
