= Ferrie Bodde =

Dutch footballer (born 1982)

Personal information
- Date of birth: 5 May 1982 (age 44)
- Place of birth: Delft, Netherlands
- Height: 1.77 m (5 ft 10 in)
- Position: Midfielder

Team information
- Current team: ADO Den Haag (coach)

Senior career*
Years	Team	Apps	(Gls)
2000–2007	ADO Den Haag	159	(11)
2007–2012	Swansea City	54	(13)
Total		213	(24)

International career
2003	Netherlands U21	1	(0)
- * Club domestic league appearances and goals

Ferrie Bodde (born 5 May 1982) is a Dutch former professional footballer who played as a midfielder. He is currently a coach at Eredivisie team ADO Den Haag.

== Club career ==
=== ADO Den Haag ===
Bodde started his senior career with Dutch side ADO Den Haag, signing professional forms with them in July 2000 at the age of 18. Bodde spent seven years with the club, playing over 150 games and scoring ten goals. On 13 June 2007, Bodde signed for Swansea City for an initial fee of £50,000, rising to £85,000 if the club were promoted. They also negotiated a clause which would see 50% of any profit on a future transfer return to Den Haag.

=== Swansea City ===
Bodde made his Swansea City debut against a First Division Swedish side Östersunds FK in a pre-season friendly on 14 July 2007, scoring his first goal and helping the Swans win their first game on Swedish soil in a 5–2 victory. His competitive debut came a month later in a League One match against Oldham Athletic, which Swansea lost 2–1. His first competitive goal for the club came in a 2–1 win away to Yeovil Town in October 2007. Bodde was sent off twice during the 2007–08 campaign, once against Doncaster Rovers for a headbutt, the other against Leeds United for an alleged stamp. Despite this, he played 33 league matches as Swansea marched to the League One title and promotion to the Football League Championship. He was also included, alongside four of his Swansea City teammates, in the PFA League One team of the year.

In the summer of 2008, Bodde was the subject of repeated interest from Derby County. Swansea chairman Huw Jenkins rejected their opening offer of £500,000 out of hand, and described it as "laughable". Derby returned with an improved offer, believed to be around £2m, but still failed to meet Swansea's valuation of the player. Bodde initially handed in a transfer request, but later withdrew it, and signed a new three-year deal with Swansea on 15 July.

Bodde made an excellent start to the Championship season for Swansea, scoring seven goals in 17 league games, one of which was a 45-yard drive against Preston North End. Bodde's form at this time was reportedly attracting interest from Bolton Wanderers and other Premiership sides. His season came to a premature end on 21 November 2008, when he suffered anterior cruciate knee ligament damage and torn cartilage in his left knee following a challenge from Birmingham City's Sebastian Larsson.

In April 2009, Bodde was included in FourFourTwo's Top 50 Football League Players, and came in at 11th place. He was described as a "box-to-box player, strong in the tackle with an uncanny knack for scoring important goals and excellent decision-making skills." Following an operation which kept him out for 10 months, Bodde made his return to the Swansea squad away to Preston North End on 15 September 2009. His comeback lasted until his first start, the home game with Sheffield United later that month, where he managed just nine minutes before being substituted after hearing something "click" in his knee. Initial diagnosis suggested Bodde needed a second operation but a host of leading surgeons in the Netherlands advised against it and instead, he spent five months with a fitness and rehabilitation coach strengthening the knee and working on his mobility.

His next comeback took place on 27 February 2010 at home to Peterborough United, where he once again suffered a recurrence of his injury and limped off after 28 minutes. After undergoing a second major operation which saw him miss the whole of Swansea's promotion winning 2010–11 season, Bodde signed a new one-year contract with Swansea following the club's return to the top flight.

After completing the early part of pre-season, Bodde started his first game for 18 months in a friendly against Port Talbot Town in July 2011. He showed flashes of his old brilliance in a brief cameo, including setting up Craig Beattie in a 3–1 victory, before being substituted after only 14 minutes, which at the time was cited as a precaution against further injuries.

However, in September, having not featured again, he underwent a third operation with keyhole surgery carried out on his problematic knee to clear away cartilage.

In January 2012, Bodde made his first appearance following his latest surgery, playing 45 minutes in a reserve team game against Hereford United. This was followed by 60 minutes for the reserves in a behind-closed-doors game against West Bromwich Albion on 24 January. Having sent scouts to the West Brom game, it was reported that Sheffield Wednesday boss Gary Megson was weighing up a loan bid for Bodde.

On 1 February, Bodde started his third comeback game in a match against Arsenal reserves at Parc y Scarlets. Scheduled to play another hour of football, Bodde suffered an injury to his other knee after just two minutes and had to be carried from the pitch following a seemingly innocuous challenge. He was immediately flown back to Netherlands for tests which revealed he had ruptured the anterior cruciate ligament in his right knee and would require another operation that could leave him out for at least six months.

On 9 May, Swansea chairman Huw Jenkins said that Bodde's surgeon had yet to decide whether the operation was needed and that the club would decide on his future at the end of the season. But on 1 June, it was reported that Bodde had been released by Swansea City and wasn't on the retained list provided by the club to the Premier League.

=== After Swansea ===
After a spell in the Netherlands training with Den Haag, it was announced on 13 December 2012 that Bodde would be training with Wigan Athletic Football Club.

In July 2013, it was reported that Bodde had been set to join Dutch amateur club Haaglandia for the coming season, but was having to shelve these plans to undergo yet another knee operation. This prompted fears that Bodde may be forced to retire from the game for good.

In April 2014, Bodde was hospitalised with a serious lung infection and placed in a five-day artificial coma. Several days later, Swansea paid tribute to their former player, displaying Bodde's name on the club's electronic scoreboard during a match, with fans chanting his name. Watching from his hospital bed in the Netherlands, Bodde said he had "goose bumps" and would be "eternally grateful" for the gesture.

== International career ==
Bodde was capped by the Netherlands at Under 23 level.

== Managerial and coaching career ==
=== sv Wateringse Veld ===
In December 2013, it was announced on the website of SV Wateringse Veld that Bodde had been appointed their new head coach on an 18-month contract.

=== ADO Den Haag ===
In June 2015, it was reported that Bodde had been appointed to the coaching staff at ADO Den Haag, working with the club's academy.

== Honours ==
Swansea City

- Football League One: 2007–08

Individual

- PFA Team of the Year: 2007–08 Football League One
