= 2012–13 Swansea City A.F.C. season =

Swansea City
2012–13 season
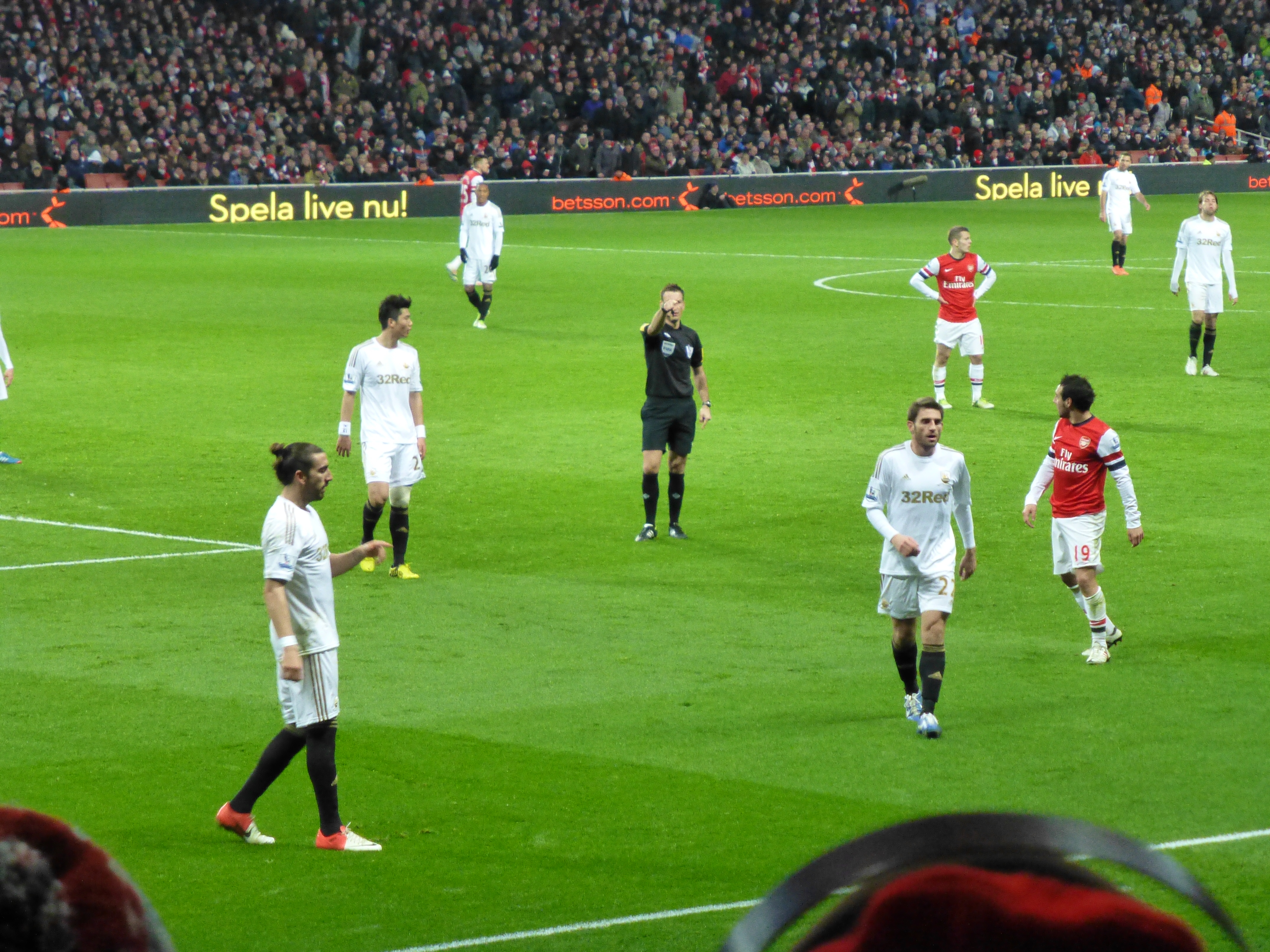
- Swansea City players during a match against Arsenal in December 2012
- Chairman: Huw Jenkins
- Manager: Michael Laudrup
- Stadium: Liberty Stadium
- Premier League: 9th
- FA Cup: Third round
- League Cup: Winners
- Top goalscorer: League: Michu (18); All: Michu (22)
- Highest home attendance: 20,650 vs. Manchester United (23 December 2012, Premier League)
- Lowest home attendance: 9,025 vs. Barnsley (28 August 2012, League Cup)
- Average home league attendance: 20,370 (League games only)
Home colours	Away colours

The 2012–13 season was Swansea City's fourth season in the top tier of English football, and their second consecutive season in the Premier League. It was their 93rd season in the English football league system.

The club celebrated its centenary, and to mark the occasion released a new crest. In keeping with the centenary theme, the home kit for the season used the colours white and gold, rather than the more traditional white and black, making it very similar to the 2011–12 Real Madrid home kit (also manufactured by Adidas). The away kit for the season was red, white and green, depicting the colours of the Welsh flag.

During pre-season, Brendan Rodgers became the new Liverpool manager and signed a three-year contract on 1 June. In total, Liverpool paid Swansea £7 million in compensation for Rodgers, coach Colin Pascoe, assistant performance analyst Chris Davies and performance consultant Glen Driscoll. On 15 June, Swansea appointed former Barcelona, Real Madrid and Juventus midfielder Michael Laudrup as their new manager. Laudrup signed a two-year contract with the club.

== Pre-season friendlies ==
Swansea began their 2012–13 campaign with a 10-day pre-season tour of America. The club played against MLS sides Colorado Rapids and San Jose Earthquakes, and also against USL Premier Development League side Ventura County Fusion. The Club also played at other venues within the UK, including a trip to Aberystwyth. This Swansea team contained some first team players, but also some reserves and youngsters, although it was part of the first team calendar. They also played Carmarthen Town. Swansea's first opponents at the Liberty Stadium were Blackpool.

24 July 2012 Friendly	Colorado Rapids	2–1	Swansea City	Commerce City, Colorado
19:00 MDT	Akpan 4'; Hill 14'	Report	De Guzmán 79'	Stadium: Dick's Sporting Goods Park

28 July 2012 Friendly	Ventura County Fusion	0–1	Swansea City	Oxnard, California
17:00 PDT		Report	Moore 21'	Stadium: Oxnard College Stadium

31 July 2012 Friendly	San Jose Earthquakes	2–2	Swansea City	Santa Clara, California
19:30 PDT	Lenhart 80', 85'	Report	Graham 41'; Flores 60'	Stadium: Buck Shaw Stadium; Attendance: 9,239

7 August 2012 Friendly	Swansea City	4–2	Blackpool	Swansea
19:00 BST	Graham 1', 45', 67'; Michu 16'		Sylvestre 24'; Ince 87' (pen.)	Stadium: Liberty Stadium; Attendance: 8,631

11 August 2012 Friendly	Swansea City	3–3	VfB Stuttgart	Swansea
15:00 BST	Graham 60', 70' (pen.); Dyer 71'	Report	Gentner 17'; Ibišević 36'; Holzhauser 79'	Stadium: Liberty Stadium; Attendance: 9,170

== Competitions ==
=== Overall ===
Competition	Started round	Current position / round	Final position / round	First match	Last match
Premier League	—	—	9th	18 August 2012	19 May 2013
League Cup	2nd round	—	Winner	28 August 2012	24 February 2013
FA Cup	3rd round	—	3rd round	6 January 2013	16 January 2013

Updated to match played 19 May 2013
Source: Competitions

=== Premier League ===
==== League table ====
Pos	Team	Pld	W	D	L	GF	GA	GD	Pts	Qualification or relegation
7	Liverpool	38	16	13	9	71	43	+28	61	
8	West Bromwich Albion	38	14	7	17	53	57	−4	49	
9	Swansea City	38	11	13	14	47	51	−4	46	Qualification for the Europa League third qualifying round (Note: Swansea City qualified for the Europa League third qualifying round as the 2012–13 Football League Cup winners.)
10	West Ham United	38	12	10	16	45	53	−8	46	
11	Norwich City	38	10	14	14	41	58	−17	44	

Source: Barclays Premier League
Rules for classification: 1) Points; 2) Goal difference; 3) Goals scored; 4) Play-offs (only if needed to decide champion, teams for relegation or teams for UEFA competitions).

==== Results summary ====
Overall								Home						Away					
Pld	W	D	L	GF	GA	GD	Pts	W	D	L	GF	GA	GD	W	D	L	GF	GA	GD
38	11	13	14	47	51	−4	46	6	8	5	28	26	+2	5	5	9	19	25	−6

Last updated: 19 May 2013.
Source: Swansea City official website

==== Results by round ====
Round	1	2	3	4	5	6	7	8	9	10	11	12	13	14	15	16	17	18	19	20	21	22	23	24	25	26	27	28	29	30	31	32	33	34	35	36	37	38
Ground	A	H	H	A	H	A	H	H	A	H	A	A	H	H	A	H	A	H	A	A	H	A	H	A	A	H	A	H	A	H	H	A	H	A	H	A	A	H
Result	W	W	D	L	L	L	D	W	L	D	D	W	D	W	W	L	L	D	D	W	D	D	W	D	L	W	L	W	L	L	L	D	D	L	D	W	L	L
Position	2	2	2	5	11	11	11	10	11	11	11	10	9	8	7	8	10	11	9	10	9	9	9	8	8	7	9	8	9	9	9	9	9	9	9	9	9	9

Updated to match(es) played on 19 May 2013. Source: Swansea City official website
A = Away; H = Home; W = Win; D = Draw; L = Loss

==== Matches ====
18 August 2012 1	Queens Park Rangers	0–5	Swansea City	London
15:00 BST	Diakité (yellow card) 55'; Fábio (yellow card) 58'	Report	Michu 8', 53'; De Guzmán (yellow card) 41'; Rangel (yellow card) 62'; Dyer 63', 71'; Sinclair 81'	Stadium: Loftus Road; Attendance: 18,072; Referee: Lee Probert

25 August 2012 2	Swansea City	3–0	West Ham United	Swansea
12:45 BST	Rangel 20', (yellow card) 30'; Michu 29'; Graham 64'; Flores (yellow card) 68'	Report	Cole (yellow card) 38'; Nolan (yellow card) 53'; Collins (yellow card) 58'; Reid (yellow card) 83'	Stadium: Liberty Stadium; Attendance: 20,424; Referee: Martin Atkinson

1 September 2012 3	Swansea City	2–2	Sunderland	Swansea
15:00 BST	Routledge 45+1'; Williams (yellow card) 55'; Michu 66'; Flores (red card) 71'	Report	Gardner (yellow card) 23'; Fletcher 40', 45+7'	Stadium: Liberty Stadium; Attendance: 20,350; Referee: Roger East

15 September 2012 4	Aston Villa	2–0	Swansea City	Birmingham
15:00 BST	Lowton 16', (yellow card) 37'; Clark (yellow card) 25'; Lichaj (yellow card) 80'; Benteke 88'	Report	Michu (yellow card) 40'	Stadium: Villa Park; Attendance: 34,005; Referee: Lee Mason

22 September 2012 5	Swansea City	0–3	Everton	Swansea
12:45 BST	Williams (yellow card) 12'; Ki (yellow card) 31'; Rangel (yellow card) 57'; Dyer (yellow card) 55' (yellow-red card) 58'; Michu (yellow card) 65'	Report	Anichebe 22'; Mirallas 43'; Osman (yellow card) 71'; Fellaini 83'	Stadium: Liberty Stadium; Attendance: 20,464; Referee: Anthony Taylor

29 September 2012 6	Stoke City	2–0	Swansea City	Stoke-on-Trent
15:00 BST	Crouch 12', 36'; Walters (yellow card) 57'	Report	Davies (yellow card) 55'	Stadium: Britannia Stadium; Attendance: 27,330; Referee: Jonathan Moss

6 October 2012 7	Swansea City	2–2	Reading	Swansea
15:00 BST	Michu (yellow card) 43', (goal) 71'; Routledge 78'	Report	Mariappa (yellow card) 15'; Pogrebnyak 31'; Hunt 44'; Tabb (yellow card) 60'; Roberts (yellow card) 73'	Stadium: Liberty Stadium; Attendance: 20,336; Referee: Mike Dean

20 October 2012 8	Swansea City	2–1	Wigan Athletic	Swansea
15:00 BST	Hernández 65'; Michu 67'; Rangel (yellow card) 76'; Ki (yellow card) 85'	Report	Boyce 69'; Beausejour (yellow card) 74'; Maloney (yellow card) 90'; Gómez (yellow card) 90+5'	Stadium: Liberty Stadium; Attendance: 19,696; Referee: Mike Jones

27 October 2012 9	Manchester City	1–0	Swansea City	Manchester
17:30 BST	Richards (yellow card) 39'; Tevez 61'	Report	Rangel (yellow card) 17'; Dyer (yellow card) 85'	Stadium: Etihad Stadium; Attendance: 46,801; Referee: Martin Atkinson

3 November 2012 10	Swansea City	1–1	Chelsea	Swansea
15:00 GMT	Britton (yellow card) 37'; De Guzmán (yellow card) 82'; Hernández 88'; Shechter (yellow card) 90+4'	Report	Azpilicueta (yellow card) 39'; Moses 60'	Stadium: Liberty Stadium; Attendance: 20,527; Referee: Kevin Friend

10 November 2012 11	Southampton	1–1	Swansea City	Southampton
15:00 GMT	Schneiderlin (yellow card) 34', (goal) 64'; Lallana (yellow card) 63'	Report	Williams (yellow card) 35'; Dyer 73'; Agustien (yellow card) 89'	Stadium: St Mary's Stadium; Attendance: 30,501; Referee: Andre Marriner

17 November 2012 12	Newcastle United	1–2	Swansea City	Newcastle upon Tyne
15:00 GMT	Santon (yellow card) 73'; Ba 90+3'	Report	Shechter (yellow card) 9'; Britton (yellow card) 26'; Michu 58'; Rangel (yellow card) 66'; De Guzmán 87'	Stadium: St James' Park; Attendance: 49,403; Referee: Phil Dowd

25 November 2012 13	Swansea City	0–0	Liverpool	Swansea
13:30 GMT	Flores (yellow card) 71'	Report		Stadium: Liberty Stadium; Attendance: 20,621; Referee: Jonathan Moss

28 November 2012 14	Swansea City	3–1	West Bromwich Albion	Swansea
19:45 GMT	Michu 9'; Routledge 11', 39'	Report	McAuley (yellow card) 13'; Brunt (yellow card) 45'; Lukaku 45+3'; Olsson (yellow card) 52'; Jones (yellow card) 90+3'	Stadium: Liberty Stadium; Attendance: 20,377; Referee: Lee Mason

1 December 2012 15	Arsenal	0–2	Swansea City	London
15:00 GMT	Vermaelen (yellow card) 85'	Report	Michu 88', 90+1'	Stadium: Emirates Stadium; Attendance: 60,098; Referee: Mark Clattenburg

8 December 2012 16	Swansea City	3–4	Norwich City	Swansea
15:00 GMT	Michu 51', 90+2'; De Guzmán 59'; Williams (yellow card) 75'; Rangel (yellow card) 89'	Report	Whittaker 16'; Bassong 40'; Holt 44'; Martin (yellow card) 45'; Snodgrass 77'	Stadium: Liberty Stadium; Attendance: 20,294; Referee: Howard Webb

16 December 2012 17	Tottenham Hotspur	1–0	Swansea City	London
13:30 GMT	Dembélé (yellow card) 53'; Vertonghen 75'; Defoe (yellow card) 90+5'	Report	Dyer (yellow card) 15'; De Guzmán (yellow card) 56'; Flores (yellow card) 81'	Stadium: White Hart Lane; Attendance: 35,783; Referee: Mike Dean

23 December 2012 18	Swansea City	1–1	Manchester United	Swansea
13:30 GMT	Michu 29'; Flores (yellow card) 59'; Williams (yellow card) 76'	Report	Evra 16'; Jones (yellow card) 27'; Rooney (yellow card) 69'; Van Persie (yellow card) 77'; Scholes (yellow card) 90+1'	Stadium: Liberty Stadium; Attendance: 20,650; Referee: Michael Oliver

26 December 2012 19	Reading	0–0	Swansea City	Reading
15:00 GMT	Pogrebnyak (yellow card) 57'; Le Fondre (yellow card) 74'	Report	Tiendalli (yellow card) 54'	Stadium: Madejski Stadium; Attendance: 24,050; Referee: Mike Jones

29 December 2012 20	Fulham	1–2	Swansea City	London
15:00 GMT	Karagounis (yellow card) 34'; Ruiz 56'; Sidwell (yellow card) 77'	Report	Graham 19'; De Guzmán 52'; Agustien (yellow card) 80'	Stadium: Craven Cottage; Attendance: 25,700; Referee: Andre Marriner

1 January 2013 21	Swansea City	2–2	Aston Villa	Swansea
15:00 GMT	Routledge 9'; Graham 90+4'	Report	Clark (yellow card) 40'; Weimann (yellow card) 41', (goal) 44'; Stevens (yellow card) 45+1'; Delph (yellow card) 45+1'; Benteke 84' (pen.)	Stadium: Liberty Stadium; Attendance: 20,406; Referee: Mark Halsey

12 January 2013 22	Everton	0–0	Swansea City	Liverpool
15:00 GMT	Baines (yellow card) 81'	Report	Pablo (yellow card) 59'; Michu (yellow card) 62'; Vorm (yellow card) 88'; Tiendalli (yellow card) 90+1'	Stadium: Goodison Park; Attendance: 35,782; Referee: Phil Dowd

19 January 2013 23	Swansea City	3–1	Stoke City	Swansea
15:00 GMT	Davies 49'; De Guzmán 57', 80'	Report	Owen 90+1'	Stadium: Liberty Stadium; Attendance: 19,603; Referee: Mike Dean

29 January 2013 24	Sunderland	0–0	Swansea City	Sunderland
19:45 GMT	McClean (yellow card) 74'	Report	Tiendalli (yellow card) 20'; Britton (yellow card) 57'	Stadium: Stadium of Light; Attendance: 35,628; Referee: Andre Marriner

2 February 2013 25	West Ham United	1–0	Swansea City	London
15:00 GMT	Vaz Tê (yellow card) 8'; Carroll 77'	Report	Flores (yellow card) 90+1'	Stadium: Boleyn Ground; Attendance: 34,962; Referee: Lee Probert

9 February 2013 26	Swansea City	4–1	Queens Park Rangers	Swansea
15:00 GMT	Michu 8', 67'; Rangel 18'; Davies (yellow card) 45+5'; Hernández 50'	Report	Samba (yellow card) 10'; Taarabt (yellow card) 40'; Traoré (yellow card) 45+5'; Zamora 48'	Stadium: Liberty Stadium; Attendance: 20,529; Referee: Neil Swarbrick

17 February 2013 27	Liverpool	5–0	Swansea City	Liverpool
15:00 GMT	Gerrard 34' (pen.); Coutinho 46'; José Enrique 50'; Suárez 56'; Sturridge 71' (pen.)	Report	Hernández (yellow card) 76'	Stadium: Anfield; Attendance: 44,832; Referee: Howard Webb

2 March 2013 28	Swansea City	1–0	Newcastle United	Swansea
15:00 GMT	Moore 85'	Report	Tioté (yellow card) 34'; Cabaye (yellow card) 37'	Stadium: Liberty Stadium; Attendance: 20,405; Referee: Craig Pawson

9 March 2013 29	West Bromwich Albion	2–1	Swansea City	West Bromwich
15:00 GMT	Lukaku 40'; Jones (yellow card) 41'; De Guzmán 61' (o.g.)	Report	Moore 33'; Dyer (yellow card) 88'	Stadium: The Hawthorns; Attendance: 24,832; Referee: Lee Mason

16 March 2013 30	Swansea City	0–2	Arsenal	Swansea
15:00 GMT	De Guzmán (yellow card) 26'	Report	Monreal 74'; Arteta (yellow card) 83'; Gervinho 90+1'	Stadium: Liberty Stadium; Attendance: 20,583; Referee: Jonathan Moss

30 March 2013 31	Swansea City	1–2	Tottenham Hotspur	Swansea
15:00 GMT	Michu (yellow card) 62', (goal) 71'; Davies (yellow card) 83'	Report	Vertonghen 7'; Bale 21'; Adebayor (yellow card) 40'; Walker (yellow card) 68'; Holtby (yellow card) 88'; Parker (yellow card) 90+5'	Stadium: Liberty Stadium; Attendance: 20,604; Referee: Anthony Taylor

6 April 2013 32	Norwich City	2–2	Swansea City	Norwich
15:00 GMT	Snodgrass (yellow card) 28', (goal) 40'; Johnson (yellow card) 30'; Turner 60', (yellow card) 85'; Holt (yellow card) 86'; Tettey (yellow card) 90+3'	Report	Davies (yellow card) 21'; Michu 35'; Williams (yellow card) 69'; Moore 75'; De Guzmán (yellow card) 89'	Stadium: Carrow Road; Attendance: 26,372; Referee: Michael Oliver

20 April 2013 33	Swansea City	0–0	Southampton	Swansea
15:00 GMT		Report		Stadium: Liberty Stadium; Attendance: 20,561; Referee: Mark Halsey

28 April 2013 34	Chelsea	2–0	Swansea City	London
15:00 GMT	Oscar 43'; Lampard 45+2' (pen.); Azpilicueta (yellow card) 55'	Report	Williams (yellow card) 37'; Britton (yellow card) 45+1'; Davies (yellow card) 70'	Stadium: Stamford Bridge; Attendance: 41,780; Referee: Mark Clattenburg

4 May 2013 35	Swansea City	0–0	Manchester City	Swansea
15:00 BST		Report		Stadium: Liberty Stadium; Attendance: 20,242; Referee: Mike Jones

7 May 2013 36	Wigan Athletic	2–3	Swansea City	Wigan
19:45 BST	Espinoza 45+1'; McCarthy 53'; Watson (yellow card) 78'; Gómez (yellow card) 90+2'	Report	Shechter (yellow card) 44', (goal) 59'; Rangel 50'; Tiendalli 76'; De Guzmán (yellow card) 90+9'	Stadium: DW Stadium; Attendance: 18,550; Referee: Kevin Friend

12 May 2013 37	Manchester United	2–1	Swansea City	Manchester
16:00 BST	Hernández 39'; Ferdinand 87'	Report	Michu 49'	Stadium: Old Trafford; Attendance: 75,572; Referee: Jonathan Moss

19 May 2013 38	Swansea City	0–3	Fulham	Swansea
16:00 BST	Hernández (yellow card) 48'; Michu (yellow card) 89'	Report	Kačaniklić 22'; Riether (yellow card) 27'; Berbatov 77'; Emanuelson 90+3'	Stadium: Liberty Stadium; Attendance: 20,365; Referee: Lee Mason

=== FA Cup ===
6 January 2013 R3	Swansea City	2–2	Arsenal	Swansea
13:30 GMT	Michu 58'; Bartley (yellow card) 79'; Graham 87'	Report	Ramsey (yellow card) 35'; Podolski 81'; Gibbs 83', (yellow card) 84'	Stadium: Liberty Stadium; Attendance: 18,848; Referee: Howard Webb

16 January 2013 R3 Replay	Arsenal	1–0	Swansea City	London
19:30 GMT	Wilshere 86'	Report		Stadium: Emirates Stadium; Attendance: 58,359; Referee: Mark Clattenburg

=== League Cup ===
28 August 2012 R2	Swansea City	3–1	Barnsley	Swansea
19:45 BST	Graham 24'; Moore 59', 88'	Report	Hassell 69'	Stadium: Liberty Stadium; Attendance: 9,025; Referee: Simon Hooper

25 September 2012 R3	Crawley Town	2–3	Swansea City	Crawley
19:45 BST	Byrne (yellow card) 19'; Simpson 45+1'; Akpan 62'	Report	Michu 27' (yellow card) 32'; Graham 72'; Monk 90+2'	Stadium: Broadfield Stadium; Attendance: 3,963; Referee: Robert Madley

31 October 2012 R4	Liverpool	1–3	Swansea City	Liverpool
20:00 GMT	Carragher (yellow card) 45+1'; Suárez 76'	Report	Flores 34'; Dyer 72'; De Guzmán 90+4'	Stadium: Anfield; Attendance: 37,521; Referee: Lee Probert

12 December 2012 QF	Swansea City	1–0	Middlesbrough	Swansea
19:45 GMT	Hines 81' (o.g.)	Report	Leadbitter (yellow card) 43'; Bailey (yellow card) 73'	Stadium: Liberty Stadium; Attendance: 15,048; Referee: Lee Probert

9 January 2013 SF L1	Chelsea	0–2	Swansea City	London
19:45 GMT	Ba (yellow card) 90+1'	Report	Michu 38'; Hernández (yellow card) 42'; Flores (yellow card) 48'; Graham 90+2'	Stadium: Stamford Bridge; Attendance: 40,172; Referee: Anthony Taylor

23 January 2013 SF L2	Swansea City	0–0 (2–0 agg.)	Chelsea	Swansea
19:45 GMT		Report	Hazard (red card) 80'	Stadium: Liberty Stadium; Attendance: 19,506; Referee: Chris Foy

24 February 2013 Final	Bradford City	0–5	Swansea City	London
16:00 GMT	Duke (red card) 56'	Report	Dyer 16', 47'; Ki (yellow card) 38'; Michu 40'; De Guzmán 59' (pen.), 90+1'	Stadium: Wembley Stadium; Attendance: 82,597; Referee: Kevin Friend

== Squad statistics ==
=== First team squads ===
Last updated on 19 May 2013

Squad No.	Name	Nationality	Position	Date of birth (age)	Signed from	Signed in	Contract ends	Apps.	Goals
Goalkeepers
1	Michel Vorm	(Netherlands)	GK	October 20, 1983 (age 43)	Utrecht	2011	2016	28	0
13	David Cornell	(Wales)	GK	March 28, 1991 (age 35)	The Academy	2009	2015	0	0
25	Gerhard Tremmel	(Germany)	GK	November 16, 1978 (age 48)	Red Bull Salzburg	2011	2015	21	0
Defenders
2	Kyle Bartley	(England)	DF	May 22, 1991 (age 35)	Arsenal	2012	2015	5	0
3	Neil Taylor	(Wales)	DF	February 7, 1989 (age 37)	Wrexham	2010	2016	6	0
4	Chico Flores	(Spain)	DF	March 6, 1987 (age 39)	Genoa	2012	2016	32	1
5	Alan Tate	(England)	DF	September 2, 1982 (age 44)	Manchester United	2004	2014	4	0
6	Ashley Williams	(Wales)	DF	August 23, 1984 (age 42)	Stockport County	2008	2015	41	0
16	Garry Monk	(England)	DF	March 6, 1979 (age 47)	Barnsley	2004	2015	15	1
21	Dwight Tiendalli	(Netherlands)	DF	October 21, 1985 (age 41)	Twente	2012	2013	20	1
22	Àngel Rangel	(Spain)	DF	November 28, 1982 (age 43)	Terrassa	2007	2016	37	3
23	Darnel Situ	(France)	DF	March 18, 1992 (age 34)	Lens	2012	2013	0	0
33	Ben Davies	(Wales)	DF	April 24, 1993 (age 33)	The Academy	2012	2016	38	1
35	Daniel Alfei	(Wales)	DF	February 23, 1992 (age 34)	The Academy	2010	2014	4	0
Midfielders
7	Leon Britton	(England)	MF	September 16, 1982 (age 44)	Sheffield United	2011	2016	39	0
9	Michu	(Spain)	MF	March 21, 1986 (age 40)	Rayo Vallecano	2012	2016	42	22
11	Pablo Hernández	(Spain)	MF	April 11, 1985 (age 41)	Valencia	2012	2015	34	3
12	Nathan Dyer	(England)	MF	November 29, 1987 (age 38)	Southampton	2009	2014	41	6
14	Roland Lamah	(Belgium)	MF	December 31, 1987 (age 38)	Osasuna	2013	2014	6	0
15	Wayne Routledge	(England)	MF	January 7, 1985 (age 41)	Newcastle United	2011	2016	42	5
20	Jonathan de Guzmán	(Netherlands)	MF	September 13, 1987 (age 39)	Villarreal	2012	2013	44	8
24	Ki Sung-yueng	(South Korea)	MF	January 24, 1989 (age 37)	Celtic	2012	2015	37	0
26	Kemy Agustien	(Netherlands)	DF	August 20, 1986 (age 40)	AZ	2010	2014	21	0
31	Lee Lucas	(Wales)	MF	June 10, 1992 (age 34)	The Academy	2010	2015	1	0
Forwards
17	Itay Shechter	(Israel)	FW	February 22, 1987 (age 39)	1. FC Kaiserslautern	2012	2013	19	1
19	Luke Moore	(England)	FW	February 13, 1986 (age 40)	West Bromwich Albion	2011	2013	19	5
41	Rory Donnelly	(Northern Ireland)	FW	February 18, 1992 (age 34)	Cliftonville	2012	2015	1	0

=== Goals and appearances ===
As of 19 May 2013

No.	Pos	Nat	Player	Total		Premier League		FA Cup		League Cup	
No.	Pos	Nat	Player	Apps	Goals	Apps	Goals	Apps	Goals	Apps	Goals
1	GK	(Netherlands) NED	Michel Vorm	28	0	26	0	2	0	0	0
2	DF	(England) ENG	Kyle Bartley	5	0	1+1	0	2	0	1	0
3	DF	(Wales) WAL	Neil Taylor	6	0	4+2	0	0	0	0	0
4	DF	(Spain) ESP	Chico Flores	32	1	26	0	2	0	4	1
5	DF	(England) ENG	Alan Tate	4	0	2+1	0	0	0	1	0
6	DF	(Wales) WAL	Ashley Williams	41	0	37	0	0	0	4	0
7	MF	(England) ENG	Leon Britton	39	0	29+2	0	2	0	6	0
9	MF	(Spain) ESP	Michu	42	22	34	18	0+2	1	6	3
11	MF	(Spain) ESP	Pablo Hernández	34	3	25+3	3	0+2	0	4	0
12	MF	(England) ENG	Nathan Dyer	42	6	24+11	3	2	0	4+1	3
13	GK	(Wales) WAL	David Cornell	0	0	0	0	0	0	0	0
14	MF	(Belgium) BEL	Roland Lamah	6	0	1+4	0	0	0	0+1	0
15	MF	(England) ENG	Wayne Routledge	42	5	28+6	5	2	0	5+1	0
16	DF	(England) ENG	Garry Monk	15	1	10+1	0	0	0	2+2	1
17	FW	(Israel) ISR	Itay Shechter	19	1	7+11	1	0	0	1	0
18	FW	(England) ENG	Leroy Lita	0	0	0	0	0	0	0	0
19	FW	(England) ENG	Luke Moore	19	5	4+12	3	0	0	2+1	2
20	MF	(Netherlands) NED	Jonathan de Guzmán	44	8	31+5	5	2	0	6	3
21	DF	(Netherlands) NED	Dwight Tiendalli	20	1	10+3	1	2	0	3+2	0
22	DF	(Spain) ESP	Àngel Rangel	37	3	30+3	3	0	0	4	0
23	DF	(France) FRA	Darnel Situ	0	0	0	0	0	0	0	0
24	MF	(South Korea) KOR	Ki Sung-yueng	37	0	19+9	0	1+1	0	6+1	0
25	GK	(Germany) GER	Gerhard Tremmel	21	0	12+2	0	0	0	7	0
26	MF	(Netherlands) NED	Kemy Agustien	21	0	4+14	0	1+1	0	1	0
28	DF	(England) ENG	Curtis Obeng	0	0	0	0	0	0	0	0
29	DF	(Wales) WAL	Jazz Richards	4	0	0	0	1	0	2+1	0
31	MF	(Wales) WAL	Lee Lucas	0	0	0	0	0	0	0	0
33	DF	(Wales) WAL	Ben Davies	43	1	32+4	1	1	0	6	0
34	MF	(Wales) WAL	Henry Jones	0	0	0	0	0	0	0	0
35	DF	(Wales) WAL	Daniel Alfei	0	0	0	0	0	0	0	0
36	FW	(Wales) WAL	James Loveridge	0	0	0	0	0	0	0	0
37	DF	(Wales) WAL	Scott Tancock	0	0	0	0	0	0	0	0
38	MF	(Wales) WAL	Gwion Edwards	0	0	0	0	0	0	0	0
39	MF	(Wales) WAL	Kurtis March	0	0	0	0	0	0	0	0
41	FW	(Northern Ireland) NIR	Rory Donnelly	1	0	0	0	0	0	0+1	0
Players featured for Swansea but left before the end of the season:
10	FW	(England) ENG	Danny Graham	22	7	10+7	3	2	1	1+2	3
11	MF	(England) ENG	Scott Sinclair	1	1	0+1	1	0	0	0	0
14	FW	(Scotland) SCO	Stephen Dobbie	1	0	0	0	0	0	0+1	0
27	MF	(England) ENG	Mark Gower	3	0	0+1	0	0	0	1+1	0

=== Top scorers ===
Includes all competitive matches. The list is sorted by shirt number when total goals are equal.

As of 12 May 2013

Rank	Pos	No.	Player	Premier League	FA Cup	League Cup	Total
1	MF	9	(Spain) Michu	18	1	3	22
2	MF	20	(Netherlands) Jonathan de Guzmán	5	0	3	8
3	FW	10	(England) Danny Graham ^^	3	1	3	7
4	MF	12	(England) Nathan Dyer	3	0	3	6
5	MF	15	(England) Wayne Routledge	5	0	0	5
5	FW	19	(England) Luke Moore	3	0	2	5
7	MF	11	(Spain) Pablo Hernández	3	0	0	3
7	DF	22	(Spain) Àngel Rangel	3	0	0	3
9	DF	4	(Spain) Chico Flores	0	0	1	1
9	MF	11	(England) Scott Sinclair ^^	1	0	0	1
9	DF	16	(England) Garry Monk	0	0	1	1
9	FW	17	(Israel) Itay Shechter	1	0	0	1
9	DF	21	(Netherlands) Dwight Tiendalli	1	0	0	1
9	DF	33	(Wales) Ben Davies	1	0	0	1
Totals				47	2	16	65

^^ Player left the club during the Season

=== Disciplinary record ===
Includes all competitive matches. The list is sorted by shirt number when total cards are equal.

As of 20 April 2013

Rank	Pos.	No.	Player	Premier League			League Cup			FA Cup			Total		
Rank	Pos.	No.	Player	Yellow card	(yellow card) (yellow-red card)	Red card	Yellow card	(yellow card) (yellow-red card)	Red card	Yellow card	(yellow card) (yellow-red card)	Red card	Yellow card	(yellow card) (yellow-red card)	Red card
1	DF	4	(Spain) Chico Flores	5	0	1	1	0	0	0	0	0	6	0	1
2	DF	22	(Spain) Àngel Rangel	7	0	0	0	0	0	0	0	0	7	0	0
3	DF	6	(Wales) Ashley Williams	6	0	0	0	0	0	0	0	0	6	0	0
3	MF	9	(Spain) Michu	5	0	0	1	0	0	0	0	0	6	0	0
5	MF	12	(England) Nathan Dyer	4	1	0	0	0	0	0	0	0	4	1	0
6	MF	20	(Netherlands) Jonathan de Guzmán	5	0	0	0	0	0	0	0	0	5	0	0
7	MF	24	(South Korea) Ki Sung-yueng	3	0	0	1	0	0	0	0	0	4	0	0
7	DF	33	(Wales) Ben Davies	4	0	0	0	0	0	0	0	0	4	0	0
9	MF	7	(England) Leon Britton	3	0	0	0	0	0	0	0	0	3	0	0
9	MF	11	(Spain) Pablo Hernández	2	0	0	1	0	0	0	0	0	3	0	0
9	DF	21	(Netherlands) Dwight Tiendalli	3	0	0	0	0	0	0	0	0	3	0	0
12	FW	17	(Israel) Itay Shechter	2	0	0	0	0	0	0	0	0	2	0	0
12	MF	26	(Netherlands) Kemy Agustien	2	0	0	0	0	0	0	0	0	2	0	0
14	GK	1	(Netherlands) Michel Vorm	1	0	0	0	0	0	0	0	0	1	0	0
14	DF	2	(England) Kyle Bartley	0	0	0	0	0	0	1	0	0	1	0	0
Total				52	1	1	4	0	0	1	0	0	57	1	1

=== Captains ===
Accounts for the Premier League only.

No.	Pos.	Name	Starts
6	CB	(Wales) Ashley Williams	28
16	CB	(England) Garry Monk	10

== Transfers and loans ==
=== Transfers in ===
No.	Pos.	Nat.	Name	Age	EU	Moving from	Type	Transfer window	Ends	Transfer fee	Source
4	DF	(Spain)	Chico Flores	25	EU	Genoa (Italy)	Transfer	Summer	July 2015	£2 million	
9	MF	(Spain)	Michu	26	EU	Rayo Vallecano (Spain)	Transfer	Summer	July 2015	£2 million	
2	DF	(England)	Kyle Bartley	21	EU	Arsenal	Transfer	Summer	August 2015	£1 million	
42	FW	(England)	Jamie Proctor	20	EU	Preston North End	Transfer	Summer	August 2014	Undisclosed	
24	MF	(South Korea)	Ki Sung-yueng	23	Non-EU	Celtic (Scotland)	Transfer	Summer	August 2015	£5.5 million	
11	MF	(Spain)	Pablo Hernández	27	EU	Valencia (Spain)	Transfer	Summer	August 2015	£5.25 million	
21	DF	(Netherlands)	Dwight Tiendalli	26	EU	Free agent	Transfer	Mid-season	May 2013	Free	

=== Transfers out ===
No.	Pos.	Nat.	Name	Age	EU	Moving to	Type	Transfer window	Transfer fee	Source
6	MF	(Netherlands)	Ferrie Bodde	30	EU	Free agent	Released (End of Contract)	Summer	N/A	
34	DF	(Wales)	Joe Walsh	20	EU	Free agent	Released (End of Contract)	Summer	N/A	
36	FW	(Wales)	Casey Thomas	21	EU	Free agent	Released (End of Contract)	Summer	N/A	
37	MF	(Wales)	Jordan Smith	19	EU	Free agent	Released (End of Contract)	Summer	N/A	
30	MF	(England)	Scott Donnelly	24	EU	Free agent	Released (Mutual Consent)	Summer	N/A	
24	MF	(Wales)	Joe Allen	22	EU	Liverpool	Transfer	Summer	£15 million	
11	MF	(England)	Scott Sinclair	23	EU	Manchester City	Transfer	Summer	£6.2 million	
8	MF	(Spain)	Andrea Orlandi	28	EU	Brighton & Hove Albion	Transfer	Summer	Free	
21	DF	(Argentina)	Federico Bessone	28	EU	Swindon Town	Transfer	Summer	Free	
14	FW	(Scotland)	Stephen Dobbie	29	EU	Brighton & Hove Albion	Transfer	Summer	Undisclosed	
42	FW	(England)	Jamie Proctor	20	EU	Crawley Town	Transfer	Winter	Undisclosed	
10	FW	(England)	Danny Graham	27	EU	Sunderland	Transfer	Winter	£5 million	
27	MF	(England)	Mark Gower	34	EU	Free agent	Released (Mutual Consent)	Mid-season	N/A	

=== Loans in ===
No.	Pos.	Name	Country	Age	Loan club	Started	Ended	Start source	End source
20	MF	Jonathan de Guzmán	(Netherlands) (Canada)	24	Villarreal	10 July 2012			
17	FW	Itay Shechter	(Israel)	25	1. FC Kaiserslautern	16 August 2012			
14	MF	Roland Lamah	(Belgium)	25	Osasuna	15 January 2013			

Sources: For loan start source see "Start source". For loan end source see "End source".
EU = if holds or not a European Union passport; Country: when 2 flags, 1st flag = country that plays for internationally, 2nd flag = country of birth; No. = number on jersey; P = Position (for position name, pause mouse pointer on abbreviation); Name = Name on jersey (for more extensive name, pause mouse pointer on name); In/Out = In: The player came in on loan, Out: The player went out on loan; Loan club = the club that the player moved on loan to or the club that the player came from on loan; Started = the date when the player's loan started; Ended = the date when the player's loan ended.

=== Loans out ===
No.	Pos.	Name	Country	Age	Loan club	Started	Ended	Start source	End source
18	FW	Leroy Lita	(England)	27	Birmingham City	7 September 2012	8 December 2012		
28	DF	Curtis Obeng	(England)	23	Fleetwood Town	25 October 2012	23 December 2012		
35	DF	Daniel Alfei	(Wales)	20	Wrexham	24 October 2012	7 January 2013		
42	FW	Jamie Proctor	(England)	20	Shrewsbury Town	26 October 2012	26 November 2012		
5	DF	Alan Tate	(England)	30	Leeds United	22 November 2012	1 January 2013		
18	FW	Leroy Lita	(England)	28	Sheffield Wednesday	25 January 2013			
29	MF	Ashley Richards	(Wales)	21	Crystal Palace	25 January 2013			
28	DF	Curtis Obeng	(England)	23	York City	30 January 2013			
38	MF	Gwion Edwards	(Wales)	19	St Johnstone	31 January 2013			

Sources: For loan start source see "Start source". For loan end source see "End source".
EU = if holds or not a European Union passport; Country: when 2 flags, 1st flag = country that plays for internationally, 2nd flag = country of birth; No. = number on jersey; P = Position (for position name, pause mouse pointer on abbreviation); Name = Name on jersey (for more extensive name, pause mouse pointer on name); In/Out = In: The player came in on loan, Out: The player went out on loan; Loan club = the club that the player moved on loan to or the club that the player came from on loan; Started = the date when the player's loan started; Ended = the date when the player's loan ended.

=== New contracts ===
No.	Pos.	Nat.	Name	Age	Status	Contract length	Expiry date	Source
33	DF	(Wales)	Ben Davies	19	Signed	2 years	July 2014	
13	GK	(Wales)	David Cornell	21	Signed	3 year	June 2015	
1	GK	(Netherlands)	Michel Vorm	28	Signed	4 year	June 2016	
6	DF	(Wales)	Ashley Williams	28	Signed	1 year	June 2015	
30	MF	(Wales)	Josh Sheehan	17	Signed	2.5 years	June 2015	
33	DF	(Wales)	Ben Davies	19	Signed	2.5 years	July 2016	
3	DF	(Wales)	Neil Taylor	23	Signed	3.5 year	June 2016	
9	FW	(Spain)	Michu	26	Signed	4 years	June 2016	
15	MF	(England)	Wayne Routledge	28	Signed	4 year	June 2016	
7	MF	(England)	Leon Britton	30	Signed	1 year	June 2016	
16	DF	(England)	Garry Monk	33	Signed	1 year	June 2015	
25	GK	(Germany)	Gerhard Tremmel	34	Signed	2.5 year	June 2015	
22	DF	(Spain)	Àngel Rangel	30	Signed	3 years	June 2016	
29	DF	(Wales)	Jazz Richards	21	Signed	3 years	June 2016	
4	DF	(Spain)	Chico Flores	26	Signed	1 year	June 2016	
34	MF	(Wales)	Henry Jones	19	Signed	1 years	June 2014	
36	FW	(Wales)	James Loveridge	18	Signed	1 years	June 2014	
39	MF	(Wales)	Kurtis March	20	Signed	1 years	June 2014	
	GK	(Wales)	Oliver Davies	18	Signed	1 years	June 2014	
	DF	(Wales)	Liam Shephard	18	Signed	1 years	June 2014	
	MF	(Wales)	Sam Evans	17	Signed	1 years	June 2014	
	MF	(Wales)	Alex Bray	17	Signed	1 years	June 2014	
35	DF	(Wales)	Daniel Alfei	21	Signed	2 years	June 2016	
37	DF	(Wales)	Scott Tancock	19	Signed	2 years	June 2015	

== Club staff ==
=== Backroom staff ===
Position	Name
Manager	(Denmark) Michael Laudrup
Assistant manager	(Denmark) Morten Wieghorst
First team coach	(Wales) Alan Curtis
Goalkeeping coach	(Wales) Adrian Tucker
Academy manager	(Wales) Tony Pennock
Head physiotherapist	(Wales) Kate Rees
Physiotherapist	(Wales) Richard Buchanan
Physiotherapist	(Wales) Ailsa Jones
Masseur	(Wales) Adele Avery
Overseas scout	(Denmark) Erik Larsen
Head of player recruitment	(England) David Leadbeater
Technical recruitment scout	(England) Tim Henderson
Head match analyst	(Wales) Gethin Rees
Football utilities co-ordinator	(Wales) Michael Eames
Football utilities co-ordinator	(Wales) Suzan Eames
Football in the community officer	(Wales) Linden Jones
Club doctor	(Wales) Dr. Jez McClusky

=== Board of directors ===
Position	Name
Chairman	(Wales) Huw Jenkins
Vice Chairman	(Wales) Leigh Dineen
Directors	(Wales) Huw Cooze (Wales) Gwilym Joseph (South Africa) Brian Katzen (Wales) Don Keefe (Wales) Martin Morgan (Wales) Steve Penny (Netherlands) John van Zweden
Associate Directors	(Wales) David Morgan (Wales) Will Morris
