= 2013 Football League Cup final =

- Match programme cover
- Event: 2012–13 Football League Cup
| Bradford City | Swansea City |
| (England) | (Wales) |
| 0 | 5 |
- Date: 24 February 2013
- Venue: Wembley Stadium, London
- Man of the Match: Nathan Dyer (Swansea City)
- Referee: Kevin Friend (Leicestershire)
- Attendance: 82,597
- Weather: Intermittent snow 2 °C (36 °F)

The 2013 Football League Cup final was a football match between Bradford City and Swansea City, which took place on 24 February 2013 at Wembley Stadium in London. It was the final match of the 2012–13 Football League Cup, the 53rd season of the Football League Cup, a football competition for the 92 teams in the Premier League and the Football League.

Bradford City, of League Two, were appearing in their first major cup final since they won the 1911 FA Cup final, and were the first fourth-tier side to reach the League Cup final since Rochdale in 1962. Swansea City, of the Premier League, were appearing in their first major English cup final in their 101-year history.

Swansea won the match 5–0, and qualified for the 2013–14 UEFA Europa League, entering in the third qualifying round. Although based in Wales, their participation in the English football league system means they took one of the English berths in the competition. It was the first time the League Cup had been won by a non-English club and the first time a major English cup had been won by a non-English club since Swansea's rivals Cardiff City won the FA Cup in 1927.

== Route to the final ==
=== Bradford City ===
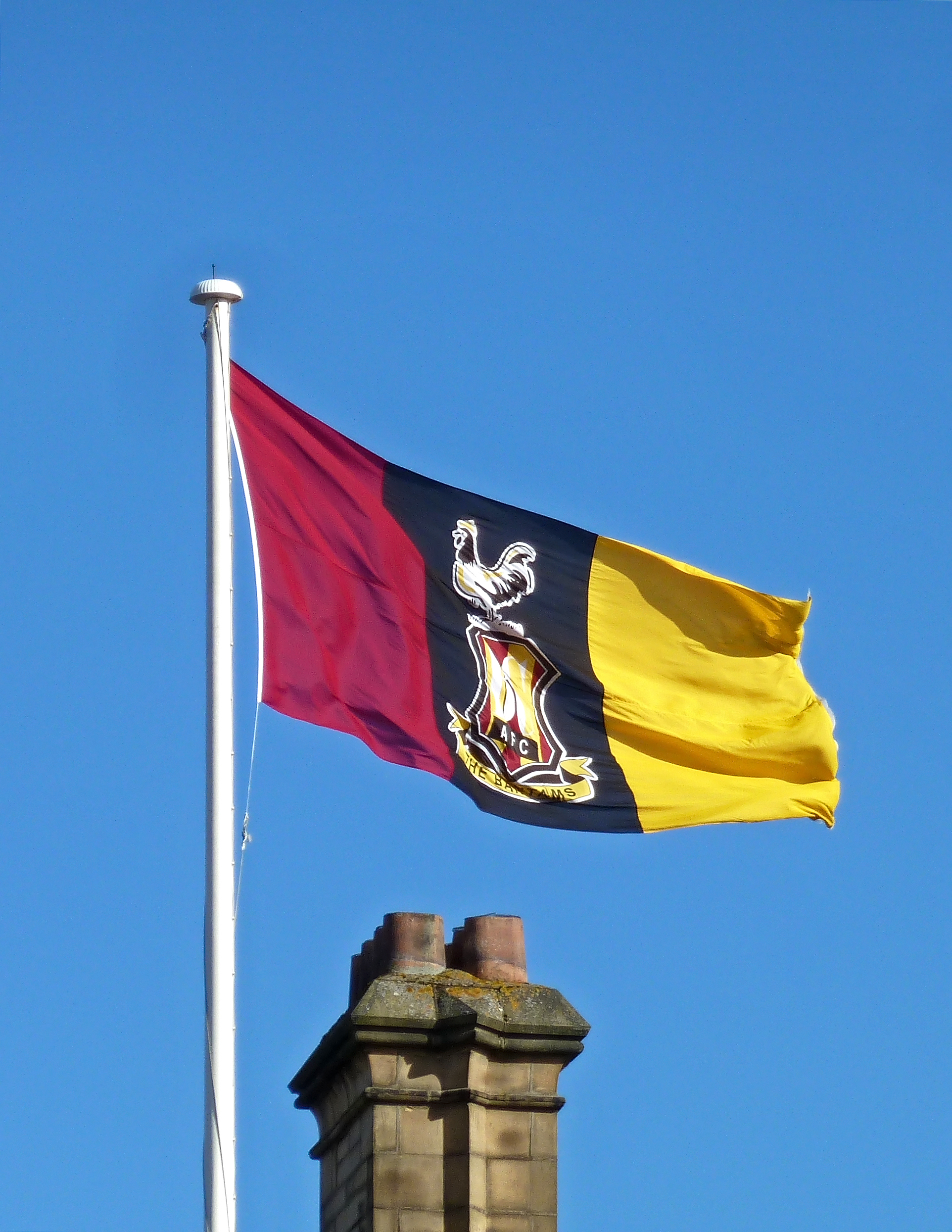
The 'Bantams' flag flying atop Bradford City Hall, marking the significance of the final for the club and city.

| Round | Opponents | Score | Report |
|---|---|---|---|
| 1st | Notts County (a) | 0–1 (a.e.t.) | Report |
| 2nd | Watford (a) | 1–2 | Report |
| 3rd | Burton Albion (h) | 3–2 (a.e.t.) | Report |
| 4th | Wigan Athletic (a) | 0–0 (2–4 pen) | Report |
| 5th | Arsenal (h) | 1–1 (3–2 pen) | Report |
| SF | Aston Villa (h) | 3–1 | Report |
| SF | Aston Villa (a) | 2–1 | Report |

Bradford City defeated League One team Notts County in the first round, winning in extra time through a James Hanson goal.

Bradford's second round tie was against Championship side Watford, who went ahead after a 71st-minute goal from Ikechi Anya. Bradford scored, first through Kyel Reid's 84th-minute equaliser and Garry Thompson in injury-time.

Burton Albion, also of League Two, played Bradford in the third round. Bradford were behind by two goals for the majority of the match, but Nahki Wells scored twice in the last 10 minutes, resulting in extra time. Stephen Darby scored the winning goal in the 115th minute.

Bradford were drawn against Wigan Athletic of the Premier League (who went on to win that year's FA Cup) in the fourth round. The match was goalless after 90 minutes and also after extra time, resulting in a penalty shoot-out. Bradford won the shoot-out 4–2 with successful penalties from Nathan Doyle, Gary Jones, Stephen Darby and Alan Connell. It was the first time Bradford had knocked a Premiership club out of the competition since they defeated Nottingham Forest in September 1995.

Bradford's quarter-final victory over Arsenal of the Premier League at Valley Parade was also decided on penalties, after the match finished 1–1 during regulation time. Nathan Doyle, Gary Jones and Alan Connell all successfully converted their penalties for Bradford, who won 3–2 on penalties.

In the semi-final first leg against Premier League Aston Villa, Nahki Wells gave Bradford the lead after 20 minutes and Rory McArdle scored in the 77th minute. Andreas Weimann scored for Aston Villa in the 82nd minute, but Carl McHugh restored Bradford's two-goal lead in the 87th after heading home Gary Jones' corner. Aston Villa won the second leg 2–1, but Bradford won 4–3 on aggregate. Christian Benteke put Aston Villa ahead in the 24th minute, before Bradford's James Hanson levelled in the 55th minute. Andreas Weimann scored an 89th-minute goal for Aston Villa.

=== Swansea City ===
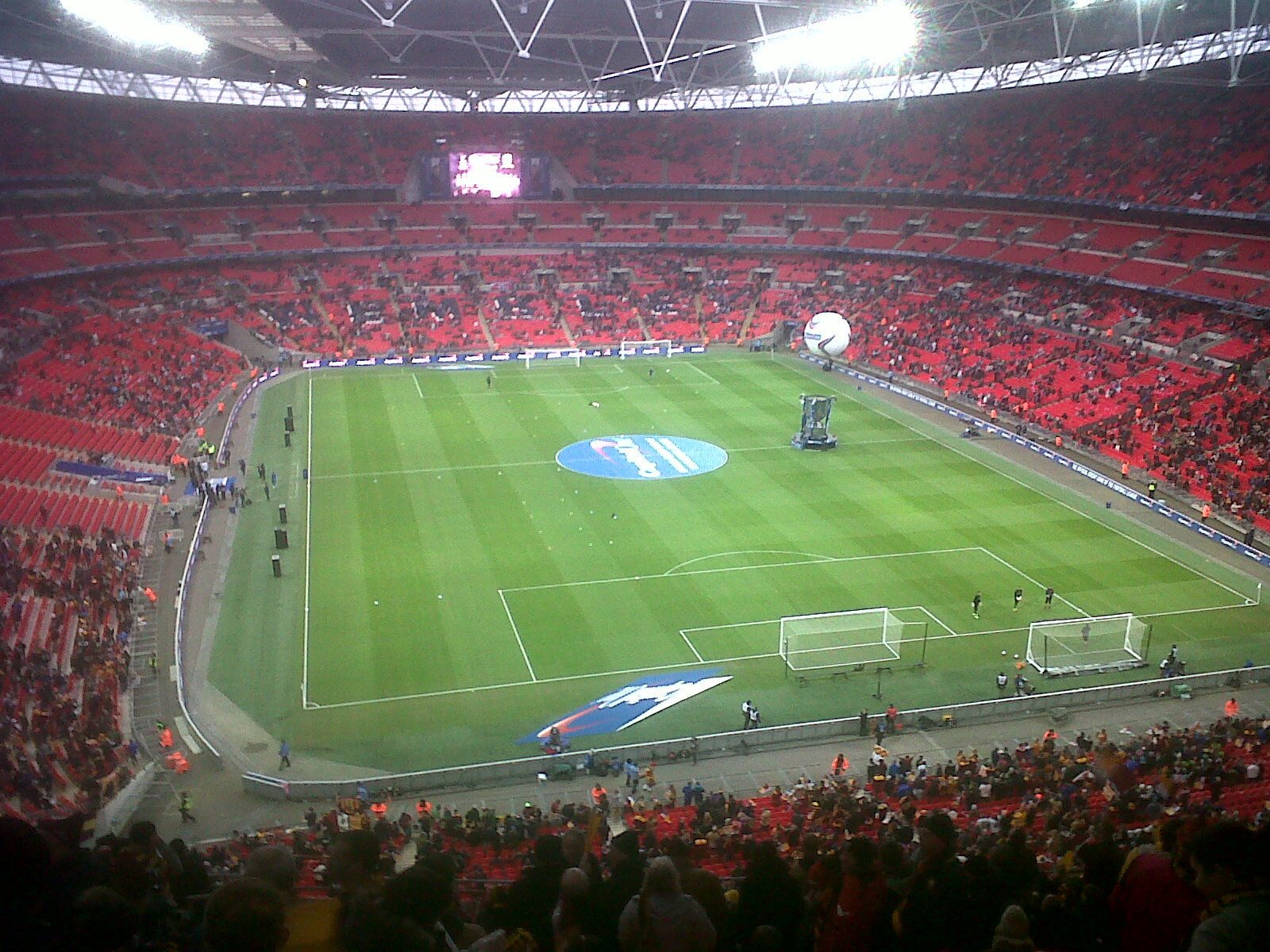
Wembley Stadium filling up before the 2013 League Cup final

| Round | Opponents | Score | Report |
|---|---|---|---|
| 2nd | Barnsley (h) | 3–1 | Report |
| 3rd | Crawley Town (a) | 2–3 | Report |
| 4th | Liverpool (a) | 1–3 | Report |
| 5th | Middlesbrough (h) | 1–0 | Report |
| SF | Chelsea (a) | 0–2 | Report |
| SF | Chelsea (h) | 0–0 | Report |

Swansea City received a bye into the second round as one of the thirteen Premier League clubs not involved in European competition. They were drawn against Championship side Barnsley at the Liberty Stadium. Swansea won 3–1 after a 24th-minute opener from Danny Graham and two second-half goals from Luke Moore.

Swansea's third round opponents were Crawley Town. Played at the Broadfield Stadium, Michu put Swansea one goal ahead in the 27th minute. Josh Simpson and Hope Akpan put Crawley 2–1 ahead after 62 minutes. Graham levelled the tie in the 74th minute with header from a Dwight Tiendalli cross. Garry Monk scored an injury-time winner from a corner kick for Swansea. The match finished 3–2 and Swansea progressed to the fourth round.

Swansea were paired with cup holders Liverpool at Anfield in the fourth round draw. Chico Flores put Swansea in the lead and Nathan Dyer scored a second goal for Swansea from a cross across the six-yard line from Pablo Hernández. Luis Suárez scored one goal for Liverpool, but a counterattack from Swansea led to a third goal for Swansea from Jonathan de Guzmán in the 90th minute.

Swansea were drawn against Championship side Middlesbrough in the quarter-final. The only goal of the game came in the 82nd minute, after Middlesbrough defender Seb Hines headed the ball into his own net.

Swansea played Chelsea in the semi-final, with the first leg at Stamford Bridge. Michu scored in the 39th minute to give Swansea the lead, following a defensive error from Branislav Ivanović. A second mistake from Ivanović allowed Danny Graham to double Swansea's lead in the 90th minute; the match ended 2–0.

The second leg was played at Swansea's Liberty Stadium. While Michu had the best opportunity to score in the 9th minute, the game finished 0–0 (2–0 on aggregate) and Swansea advanced to the final. In the 80th minute, there was an incident between a ball boy and Chelsea player Eden Hazard. Replays showed that the ball boy was shielding the ball from Hazard in an attempt to waste time. Hazard then kicked the ball out from under the boy, prompting referee Chris Foy to show him a red card for violent conduct.

=== Pre-match ===
Before the match, it was announced that the English national anthem "God Save the Queen" would not be played before the final, as was usually traditional for the cup final. This was due to a Football League policy not to play the anthem when English and Welsh clubs met in a final.

== Match ==
=== Details ===
24 February 2013
16:00 GMT

| Bradford City (England) | 0–5 | (Wales) Swansea City |
|---|---|---|
| | Report | Dyer 16', 48'; Michu 40'; De Guzmán 59' (pen.), 90+1' |

Wembley Stadium, London
Attendance: 82,597
Referee: Kevin Friend (Leicestershire)

| Bradford City | Swansea City |

| GK | 12 | (England) Matt Duke | (red card) 56' |
| RB | 2 | (England) Stephen Darby |
| CB | 23 | (Northern Ireland) Rory McArdle |
| CB | 16 | (Republic of Ireland) Carl McHugh |
| LB | 27 | (Australia) Curtis Good | (substituted off) 46' |
| RM | 11 | (England) Garry Thompson | (substituted off) 74' |
| CM | 18 | (England) Gary Jones (c) |
| CM | 24 | (England) Nathan Doyle |
| LM | 14 | (England) Will Atkinson |
| CF | 9 | (England) James Hanson |
| CF | 21 | (Bermuda) Nahki Wells | (substituted off) 58' |
Substitutes:
| GK | 1 | (Scotland) Jon McLaughlin | (substituted on) 58' |
| DF | 5 | (England) Andrew Davies | (substituted on) 46' |
| MF | 4 | (England) Ricky Ravenhill |
| MF | 7 | (England) Kyel Reid |
| MF | 26 | (England) Blair Turgott |
| FW | 17 | (England) Alan Connell |
| FW | 20 | (England) Zavon Hines | (substituted on) 74' |
Manager:
(England) Phil Parkinson

| GK | 25 | (Germany) Gerhard Tremmel |
| RB | 22 | (Spain) Àngel Rangel |
| CB | 24 | (South Korea) Ki Sung-yueng | (yellow card) 38' | (substituted off) 63' |
| CB | 6 | (Wales) Ashley Williams (c) |
| LB | 33 | (Wales) Ben Davies | | (substituted off) 84' |
| CM | 7 | (England) Leon Britton |
| CM | 20 | (Netherlands) Jonathan de Guzmán |
| RW | 12 | (England) Nathan Dyer | | (substituted off) 78' |
| AM | 11 | (Spain) Pablo Hernández |
| LW | 15 | (England) Wayne Routledge |
| CF | 9 | (Spain) Michu |
Substitutes:
| GK | 1 | (Netherlands) Michel Vorm |
| DF | 16 | (England) Garry Monk | | (substituted on) 63' |
| DF | 21 | (Netherlands) Dwight Tiendalli | | (substituted on) 84' |
| MF | 14 | (Belgium) Roland Lamah | | (substituted on) 78' |
| MF | 26 | (Netherlands) Kemy Agustien |
| FW | 17 | (Israel) Itay Shechter |
| FW | 19 | (England) Luke Moore |
Manager:
(Denmark) Michael Laudrup

Man of the match

- Nathan Dyer (Swansea City)

Match officials

- Assistant referees:
  - Stuart Burt (Northamptonshire)
  - Scott Ledger (South Yorkshire)
- Fourth official: Michael Oliver (Northumberland)
- Reserve assistant referee: Peter Bankes (Merseyside)

Match rules

- 90 minutes
- 30 minutes of extra time if necessary
- Penalty shootout if scores still level
- Seven named substitutes, of which up to three may be used

=== Statistics ===
| Statistics | Bradford City | Swansea City |
|---|---|---|
| Total shots | 3 | 15 |
| Shots on target | 3 | 10 |
| Ball possession | 40% | 60% |
| Corner kicks | 1 | 8 |
| Fouls committed | 3 | 4 |
| Offsides | 1 | 2 |
| Yellow cards | 0 | 1 |
| Red cards | 1 | 0 |
