= Danny Graham (footballer) =

English footballer (born 1985)

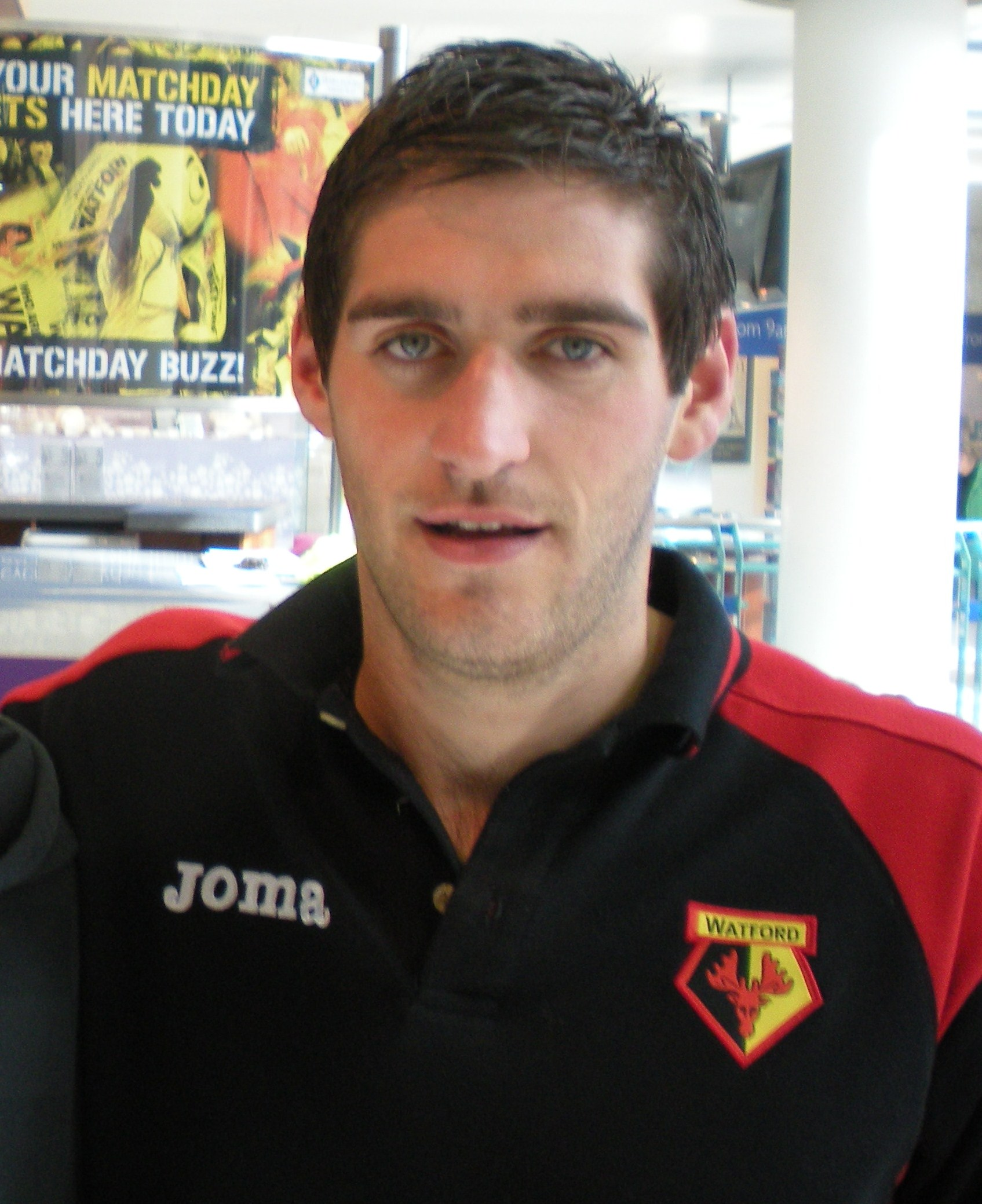
- Graham in 2010

Personal information
- Full name: Daniel Anthony William Graham
- Date of birth: 12 August 1985 (age 41)
- Place of birth: Gateshead, England
- Height: 6 ft 0 in (1.83 m)
- Position: Striker

Youth career
- ?–2003: Chester-le-Street Town
- 2003–2004: Middlesbrough

Senior career*
| Years | Team | Apps | (Gls) |
| 2004–2007 | Middlesbrough | 15 | (1) |
| 2004 | → Darlington (loan) | 9 | (2) |
| 2005–2006 | → Derby County (loan) | 14 | (0) |
| 2006 | → Leeds United (loan) | 3 | (0) |
| 2006 | → Blackpool (loan) | 4 | (1) |
| 2007 | → Carlisle United (loan) | 11 | (7) |
| 2007–2009 | Carlisle United | 89 | (29) |
| 2009–2011 | Watford | 91 | (38) |
| 2011–2013 | Swansea City | 54 | (15) |
| 2013–2016 | Sunderland | 37 | (1) |
| 2013–2014 | → Hull City (loan) | 18 | (1) |
| 2014 | → Middlesbrough (loan) | 18 | (6) |
| 2014 | → Wolverhampton Wanderers (loan) | 5 | (1) |
| 2016 | → Blackburn Rovers (loan) | 18 | (7) |
| 2016–2020 | Blackburn Rovers | 158 | (45) |
| 2020–2021 | Sunderland | 14 | (0) |
| Total | | 558 | (154) |

International career
| 2005 | England U20 | 1 | (0) |
- * Club domestic league appearances and goals

Daniel Anthony William Graham (born 12 August 1985) is an English former professional footballer who played as a striker.

Graham started his professional career at Middlesbrough in 2003, making his debut for the club in a Premier League match against Manchester United the following year. He later represented England at under-20 level. During his four years at Middlesbrough, Graham made just one first team start. He was loaned out to clubs in all three divisions of the Football League, before joining his final loan club Carlisle United on a two-year deal in 2007.

At the end of his contract, he joined Championship side Watford, who were subsequently ordered to pay compensation. Graham was Watford's top-scorer in both of his seasons at Vicarage Road, as well as the club's Player of the Season award and the Championship's overall top scorer in the 2010–11 season. In July 2011, Graham transferred to newly promoted Premier League team Swansea City for £3.5 million, where in his first season he was their top goalscorer with 12 league goals. In January 2013, he moved to Sunderland, but his stint at the Wearside club was mixed; his first and only goal came over two years after his arrival, and he was often loaned out to other clubs. He was released in June 2016. He moved to Blackburn Rovers permanently where he would win promotion as well as being named in the PFA Team of the Year for the 2017–18 season. He won the club's Player of the Season award in the following season. Graham left Blackburn in 2020 and returned to Sunderland before retiring in 2021.

== Club career ==
=== Middlesbrough ===
Born in Gateshead, Tyne and Wear, Graham attended Heworth Grange Comprehensive School, and represented the Gateshead Schools FA team. He started his career at Chester-le-Street Town, in the Northern League, before joining Middlesbrough on a permanent transfer in 2003.

In the 2003–04 season, he spent time on loan at Division Three side Darlington. The move to Darlington on loan was initially unlikely, but thanks to supporters funded the move, allowing Graham joining Darlington on loan to happen. Graham made his debut, where he came off the bench for Neil Teggart in the 79th minutes, in a 1–1 draw against Doncaster Rovers on 20 March 2004. Graham made his full start on 3 April 2004, in a 1–0 loss against Boston United and score his first goal, in a 3–2 loss against Southend United on 12 April 2004. Despite manager David Hodgson's outrage over a 3–2 loss, he praised Graham's performance and scoring his first goal. Following this, Graham's loan spell with Darlington was later extended until the end of the season. He would go on to score two goals in nine league appearances.

Despite assistant manager Martin Gray's hints of Graham rejoining Darlington on a season-long loan, Graham stayed and he made his Middlesbrough debut on 3 October 2004, as a late substitute in a 1–1 Premier League draw against Manchester United. He scored his first goal for the club three weeks later, against Coventry City in the League Cup, and scored his first Premier League goal on 27 February 2005 against Charlton Athletic. On 9 March 2005, Graham signed a new contract with Middlesbrough on a two-year deal, that would keep him until 2007. The following season, Graham was loaned to Derby County and Leeds United, but did not score a league goal for either club. Despite having played for Middlesbrough in both the Premier League and UEFA Cup, Graham was unable to secure a place in the starting lineup; his only league start for the club came in a 1–0 defeat to Fulham at the end of the 2005–06 season.

In July 2006, Middlesbrough confirmed they were willing to let the once-hot prospect leave the club. Graham subsequently went on loan to Blackpool at the start of the 2006–07 season, scoring once in the league against Bristol City.

At the end of 2006, Graham moved to Carlisle United on loan. He returned to Middlesbrough on 5 February 2007, after playing only two matches due to a leg injury, but returned to Brunton Park after recovering to complete a three-month loan. The final match of his loan was against Bristol City, where he scored Carlisle's only goal in a 3–1 defeat. During two loan spells at Carlisle, he scored 7 league goals in 11 matches.

Graham was released by Middlesbrough on 10 May 2007, and signed a two-year deal with Carlisle United on 6 June 2007.

=== Carlisle United ===
Graham started the 2007–08 season in good form, and was the division's top goalscorer from August until October, including one against his former loanee club Leeds United. However, after his goal on 13 October 2007, Graham did not score again until 2 February 2008. He made his 100th career appearance playing for Carlisle United against Nottingham Forest at the City Ground on 3 March 2008, scoring the winning goal in a 1–0 victory, in a match broadcast live on Sky Sports.

Graham also started the 2008–09 season in goalscoring form, netting 13 goals between August and December, including scoring a hat-trick, in a 4–1 win over Yeovil Town on 30 August 2008. Following this, Graham was awarded League One Player of the Month for August. At the end of the season, Graham scored fifteen goals in the 2008–09 season despite the club managed to survive relegation. Graham was then offered a new two-year contract to stay at the club. However, Graham turned down a new contract to stay at the club and will be leaving.

=== Watford ===
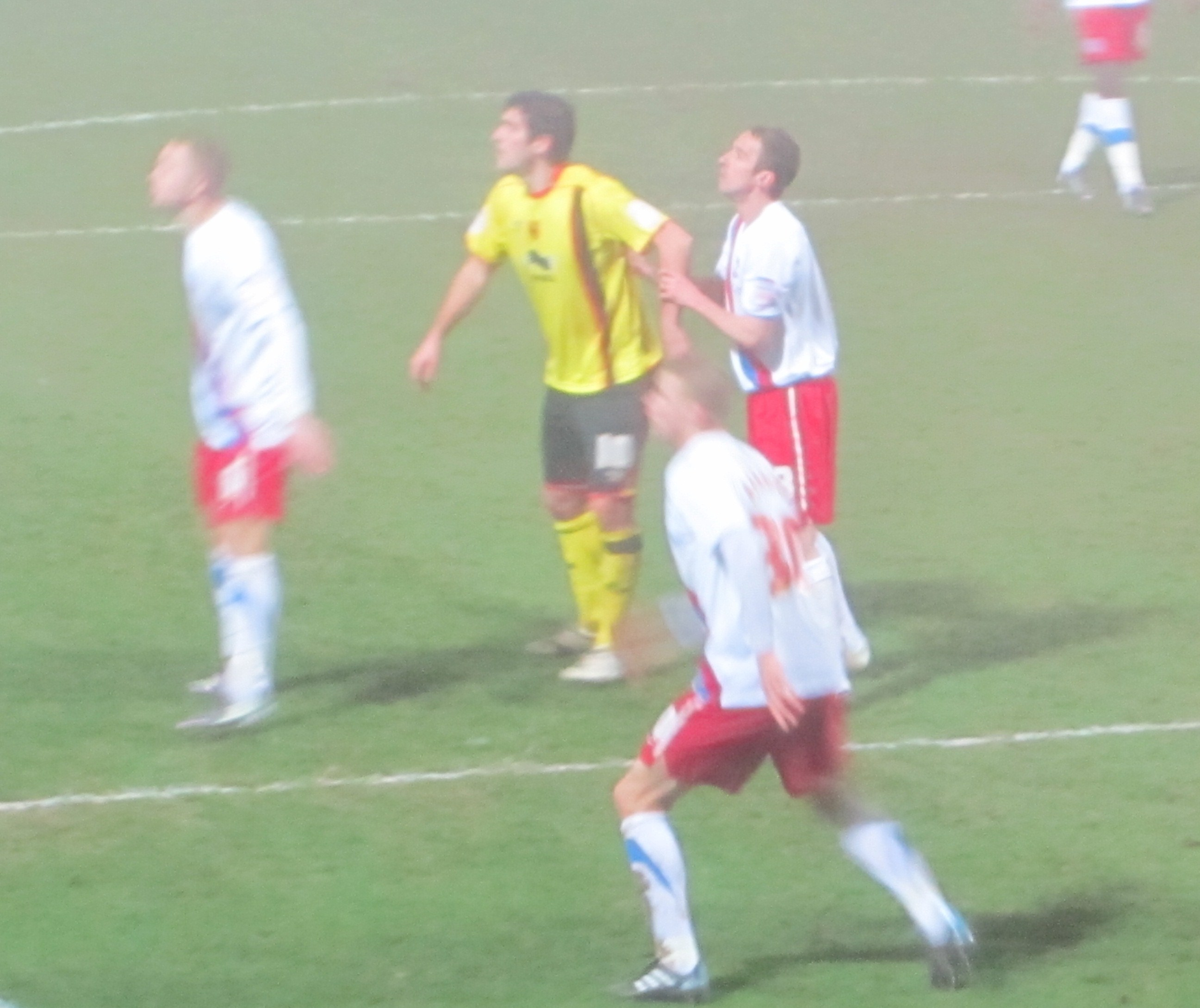
Graham (centre; yellow shirt) playing for Watford against Crystal Palace, 2011 season

After several failed attempts by Carlisle to renew Graham's contract, he joined Watford on a two-year contract on 2 July 2009. A tribunal later decided that Watford should pay an initial £200,000 in compensation to Carlisle, which eventually rose to £350,000.

Graham scored several goals for Watford in pre-season, and scored on his competitive debut for the club in a 1–1 draw with Doncaster Rovers at Vicarage Road. On 5 April 2010, Graham scored from 25 yards out to give Watford the lead in their 1–1 draw with West Bromwich Albion. Graham finished the season as Watford's top scorer, with 14 league goals.

In 2010–11 season, Graham started his season when he scored twice, in the opening match of the season, as Watford beat Norwich City. In September 2010, Graham signed a three-year contract. On 15 January 2011, against Derby County, Graham equalled the Watford record for the most goals scored in consecutive matches, finding the net for the seventh successive match. Graham sustained his good goal-scoring form, finishing as Championship top-scorer for the 2010–11 season, with 24 goals in the league. He was named in the 2010–11 Championship PFA Team of the Year, and was also voted Watford Player of the Season.

Watford received and rejected a £2.5 million bid from Queens Park Rangers for Graham's services in May 2011. On 4 June 2011, the club accepted a £3.5 million bid from Swansea City.

=== Swansea City ===
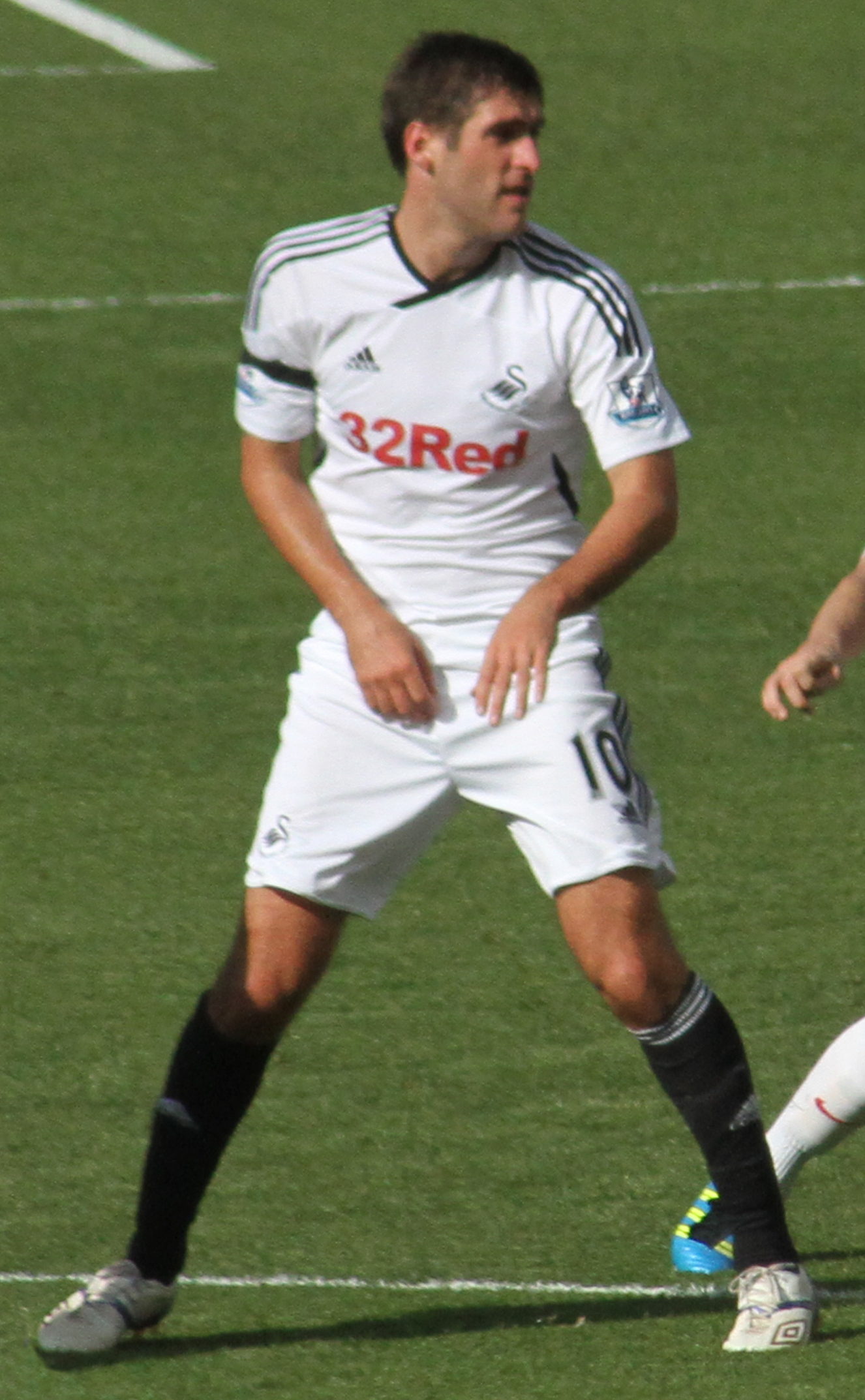
Graham playing for Swansea City, 2011

On 7 June 2011, Graham completed his £3.5 million move to newly promoted Premier League side Swansea City. He scored his first unofficial goal on 6 August 2011, in a pre-season friendly against La Liga side Real Betis at the Liberty Stadium.

He scored his first competitive goal on 2 October 2011, in a 2–0 win at home to Stoke City. Following this, Graham says he is aiming to score more goals. As the following week, Graham started to score four goals in four matches, starting with scoring his second goal for Swansea in a 3–1 defeat to Norwich City. then scored his third goal on 22 October, in a 2–2 draw with Wolverhampton Wanderers; his third came on 29 October, he scored his fourth goal in as many matches in a 3–1 win against Bolton Wanderers, having also scored an own goal earlier on in the match.

Graham scored his fifth goal on 10 December against Fulham, after coming on as a substitute for Leroy Lita. His sixth goal of the season came on 27 December 2011, against Queens Park Rangers. His seventh goal of the season came on 15 January 2012, against Arsenal, which turned out to be a winner.

Graham also scored the winner for Swansea in a 2–1 away win at West Bromwich Albion in snowy conditions on 5 February 2012. On 11 February 2012, he scored two goals against Norwich City in a 3–2 defeat, the first a curling effort and the second a penalty. He scored Swansea's fourth in a 4–4 draw with Wolverhampton Wanderers on 28 April and then scored the winner, his twelfth and final goal of the season, in the 86th minute, on 13 May against Liverpool to lift the Swans to 11th place in the Premier League.

Graham started the 2012–13 season by scoring against West Ham United in Swansea's first home match of the season. But shortly afterwards, he found himself starting matches on the bench due to the emergence of Spanish striker Michu. In late December, an injury to Michu gave Graham a chance to impress, and he scored his first goal in 4 months in a 2–1 victory at Fulham. Graham continued to hit the back of the net from then on, with goals in the next three consecutive matches, including a last minute goal in a 2–0 victory away at Chelsea, in the first leg of the League Cup semi-final. Even with these good performances, his playing minutes continued to decrease as Michu flourished as Swansea's single striker, leading to transfer speculation from other Premier League clubs. Despite local reports suggesting that Graham could leave the club, he stated that he was committed to stay. Then in mid-January, manager Michael Laudrup stated there were offers to sign Graham.

=== Sunderland ===
Graham signed for Sunderland on 31 January 2013 for £5 million on a three-and-a-half-year contract. Graham also attracted interests from his former club, Middlesbrough. However, his move to Sunderland was controversial; Graham is a fan of Newcastle United, Sunderland's rival.

He made his debut on 2 February, coming on as a substitute in the 79th minute to replace Stéphane Sessègnon in a 2–1 defeat away to Reading. In his last match for Swansea prior to joining Sunderland, Graham was booed and jeered by the club's supporters, as he came on as a substitute, though he described it as "it never once put [me] off in terms of wanting to move here." Despite playing 11 matches for Sunderland in his first half season at the club, Graham was unable to score his first goal for Sunderland and loaned out to Hull City the following season. Graham admitted he didn't do very well and his form had dropped badly since his arrival in January.

Upon returning to Sunderland, manager Gus Poyet said placing Graham in the first team ahead of the 2014–15 season would be very difficult. Graham made a return to Premier League football as a late substitute in Sunderland's 1–0 home loss against Liverpool on 10 January 2015. He also appeared as a substitute against Tottenham Hotspur the following week. Graham was credited with his only Sunderland goal on 9 May 2015, after a Jordi Gómez shot hit him in a 2–0 victory at Everton. It was to be his only goal for Sunderland, as he was released a year later on 10 June 2016, having spent the second part of the season at Blackburn Rovers.

==== Various loan spells ====
Graham joined Hull City on a season-long loan from Sunderland on 19 July 2013. He made his debut on the first day of the 2013–14 season in a 2–0 loss away at Chelsea and scored his first goal for the club on 9 December 2013 in a 1–1 draw at his former club Swansea City, which was his first goal in 30 matches; this turned out to be his only goal for the club.

On 31 January 2014, his loan spell at Hull was terminated and was instead loaned to Championship side Middlesbrough for the rest of the season. He made his debut on 3 February 2014, as a substitute in a goalless draw at Doncaster. On 8 March 2014, Graham scored both goals in a 2–0 home win against Ipswich Town to open his account for Boro, and ended his loan stay with six goals in total.

Ahead of the 2014–15 season, Middlesbrough entered into talks to sign Graham, but no agreement was ultimately reached. He was also linked with a loan move to Brentford, but this too did not come to fruition.

On 14 November 2014, a loan deal was agreed with Championship side Wolverhampton Wanderers. During five appearances for the club, he scored once (against AFC Bournemouth) before his loan expired at the end of the year.

=== Blackburn Rovers ===
On 20 January 2016, Graham signed a loan deal with Blackburn Rovers for the remainder of the 2015–16 season. He scored his first goal for Blackburn in a 3–0 win over Fulham on 16 February 2016. His second goal came on 1 March 2016, in a 2–1 victory over Middlesbrough.

On 23 June 2016, Graham signed a two-year permanent deal with Blackburn reserving the option to extend for a third year. In August, he scored his first goal for the club in a 2–1 defeat against Cardiff City, which also saw Shane Duffy scoring two own goals. In November, he scored a brace in a 3–2 victory over Brentford. He scored his first goal in the 15th minute which equalised Scott Hogan's first-minute goal. He scored again five minutes later from the penalty spot which was awarded to Rovers following a foul on Corry Evans. He ended the season scoring 13 goals in the league although the club was relegated to League One. In August 2017, it was reported by the media that Queens Park Rangers were interested in signing him.

He entered into talks for a new contract with Blackburn at the end of the 2017–18 season. Graham signed a new contract on 11 June 2018, with the option of a further 12 months. He left the club at the end of the 2019–20 season

=== Return to Sunderland ===
Graham returned to Sunderland after signing with them on 7 September 2020. On 1 February 2021, Graham left Sunderland via mutual consent and subsequently retired from professional football.

=== Post-retirement and personal life ===
In January 2018, he donated £2,500 to a crowd-funding page to help Hartlepool United who were at risk of administration. After retirement he has worked as a self-employed performance advisor to young players. In November 2022, he crashed his Land Rover into a Co-op while being almost 3 times over the legal alcohol limit, forcing the shop to close for five days and causing damage estimated at £32,000. Graham was banned from driving for 2 years, given a 12-month community order, and given a 90-day alcohol ban, monitored by a tag.

== International career ==
Graham was capped once by England at under-20 level, starting a 2–0 victory against Russia on 4 February 2005.

== Career statistics ==
Appearances and goals by club, season and competition
| Club | Season | League | | | FA Cup | | League Cup | | Other | | Total | |
| Club | Season | Division | Apps | Goals | Apps | Goals | Apps | Goals | Apps | Goals | Apps | Goals |
|---|---|---|---|---|---|---|---|---|---|---|---|---|
| Darlington (loan) | 2003–04 | Third Division | 9 | 2 | 0 | 0 | 0 | 0 | 0 | 0 | 9 | 2 |
| Middlesbrough | 2004–05 | Premier League | 11 | 1 | 2 | 0 | 2 | 1 | 2 (Note: Appearances in UEFA Cup) | 0 | 17 | 2 |
| Middlesbrough | 2005–06 | Premier League | 3 | 0 | 0 | 0 | 0 | 0 | 0 | 0 | 3 | 0 |
| Middlesbrough | 2006–07 | Premier League | 1 | 0 | 0 | 0 | 0 | 0 | 0 | 0 | 1 | 0 |
| Middlesbrough | Total | | 15 | 1 | 2 | 0 | 2 | 1 | 2 | 0 | 21 | 2 |
| Derby County (loan) | 2005–06 | Championship | 14 | 0 | 0 | 0 | 0 | 0 | 0 | 0 | 14 | 0 |
| Leeds United (loan) | 2005–06 | Championship | 3 | 0 | 0 | 0 | 0 | 0 | 0 | 0 | 3 | 0 |
| Blackpool (loan) | 2006–07 | League One | 4 | 1 | 0 | 0 | 0 | 0 | 0 | 0 | 4 | 1 |
| Carlisle United (loan) | 2006–07 | League One | 11 | 7 | 0 | 0 | 0 | 0 | 0 | 0 | 11 | 7 |
| Carlisle United | 2007–08 | League One | 47 | 15 | 2 | 0 | 2 | 1 | 2 (Note: Appearances in Football League Trophy) | 1 | 53 | 17 |
| Carlisle United | 2008–09 | League One | 44 | 15 | 3 | 1 | 1 | 0 | 1 | 0 | 49 | 16 |
| Carlisle United | Total | | 91 | 30 | 5 | 1 | 3 | 1 | 3 | 1 | 102 | 33 |
| Watford | 2009–10 | Championship | 46 | 14 | 1 | 0 | 2 | 0 | 0 | 0 | 49 | 14 |
| Watford | 2010–11 | Championship | 45 | 24 | 2 | 1 | 2 | 2 | 0 | 0 | 49 | 27 |
| Watford | Total | | 91 | 38 | 3 | 1 | 4 | 2 | 0 | 0 | 98 | 41 |
| Swansea City | 2011–12 | Premier League | 36 | 12 | 2 | 2 | 1 | 0 | 0 | 0 | 39 | 14 |
| Swansea City | 2012–13 | Premier League | 18 | 3 | 2 | 1 | 3 | 3 | 0 | 0 | 23 | 7 |
| Swansea City | Total | | 54 | 15 | 4 | 3 | 4 | 3 | 0 | 0 | 62 | 21 |
| Sunderland | 2012–13 | Premier League | 13 | 0 | — | | — | | 0 | 0 | 13 | 0 |
| Sunderland | 2014–15 | Premier League | 14 | 1 | 2 | 0 | 1 | 0 | 0 | 0 | 17 | 1 |
| Sunderland | 2015–16 | Premier League | 10 | 0 | 1 | 0 | 1 | 0 | 0 | 0 | 12 | 0 |
| Sunderland | Total | | 37 | 1 | 3 | 0 | 2 | 0 | 0 | 0 | 42 | 1 |
| Hull City (loan) | 2013–14 | Premier League | 18 | 1 | 1 | 0 | 1 | 0 | 0 | 0 | 20 | 1 |
| Middlesbrough (loan) | 2013–14 | Championship | 18 | 6 | — | | — | | 0 | 0 | 18 | 6 |
| Wolverhampton Wanderers (loan) | 2014–15 | Championship | 5 | 1 | 0 | 0 | 0 | 0 | 0 | 0 | 5 | 1 |
| Blackburn Rovers (loan) | 2015–16 | Championship | 18 | 7 | — | | — | | 0 | 0 | 18 | 7 |
| Blackburn Rovers | 2016–17 | Championship | 35 | 12 | 3 | 1 | 2 | 0 | 0 | 0 | 40 | 13 |
| Blackburn Rovers | 2017–18 | League One | 42 | 14 | 4 | 3 | 0 | 0 | 2 (Note: Appearances in EFL Trophy) | 0 | 48 | 17 |
| Blackburn Rovers | 2018–19 | Championship | 43 | 15 | 2 | 0 | 1 | 1 | 0 | 0 | 46 | 16 |
| Blackburn Rovers | 2019–20 | Championship | 38 | 4 | 0 | 0 | 1 | 0 | 0 | 0 | 39 | 4 |
| Blackburn Rovers | Total | | 158 | 45 | 9 | 4 | 4 | 1 | 2 | 0 | 173 | 50 |
| Sunderland | 2020–21 | League One | 14 | 0 | 1 | 0 | 0 | 0 | 2 | 1 | 17 | 1 |
| Career total | | | 560 | 155 | 28 | 9 | 20 | 8 | 9 | 2 | 617 | 174 |

== Honours ==
Swansea City

- Football League Cup: 2012–13

Blackburn Rovers

- EFL League One runner-up: 2017–18

Individual

- PFA Fans' Championship Player of the Year: 2010–11
- PFA Team of the Year: 2010–11 Championship, 2017–18 League One
- Football League Championship Golden Boot: 2010–11
- Watford Player of the Season: 2010–11
- Blackburn Rovers Player of the Year: 2018–19
