= Adrian Tucker =

Welsh footballer and manager

Personal information
- Full name: Adrian John Tucker
- Date of birth: 26 September 1976 (age 50)
- Place of birth: Merthyr Tydfil, Wales
- Position: Goalkeeper

Senior career*
| Years | Team | Apps | (Gls) |
| 1994–1995 | Torquay United | 1 | (0) |
| 1995–1996 | Inter Cardiff | 16 | (0) |
| 1996–1997 | Ebbw Vale | 8 | (0) |

Managerial career
- 2007–2010: Wales (women)
- 2009–2014: Swansea City (GK coach)
- 2015–2018: Sunderland (GK coach)
- 2018-2019: Swansea City (GK coach)
- 2019–2020: Bristol Rovers (GK coach)
- 2020–2021: Morocco (Head of Goalkeeping)
- 2021–: England youth teams (GK coach)
- * Club domestic league appearances and goals

Adrian John Tucker (born 26 September 1976) is a Welsh former professional footballer who played as a goalkeeper. He is currently a goalkeeping coach for the England national youth football teams.

Tucker has previously had two spells as goalkeeper coach at Swansea City (2009–2014, 2018–2019), where he was part of Swansea City's promotion campaign to the Premier League in 2011 and League Cup win in 2013. He was also the goalkeeping coach at Sunderland from 2015 to 2018.

== Club career ==
Born in Merthyr Tydfil, Tucker began his playing career with Torquay United. His debut came in December 1994, during an FA Cup second round replay at home to Enfield, when regular Torquay goalkeeper Ashley Bayes was sent off.

A shoulder injury spoiled Tucker's professional career. After leaving Torquay in 1995, he played in the Welsh Premier League and Welsh pyramid system for a number of years.

== Coaching career ==
Tucker spent 12 years working for the Football Association of Wales in their technical coaching and development department.

In October 2007, Tucker took charge of his first match for the Wales women's national football team, following the resignation of Andy Beattie, a spell which lasted 2 years until he joined Swansea City first time around in July 2009 as a goalkeeping coach under incoming manager Paulo Sousa, replacing Iñaki Bergara who had followed Roberto Martínez to Wigan Athletic. After Sousa's departure, Tucker remained as part of Brendan Rodgers' backroom staff, as the Swans gained promotion to the Premier League. Following Rodgers' departure to Liverpool, Tucker continued in his role under Michael Laudrup, where the Swans won the League Cup in 2013 and entered the UEFA Europa League. After five seasons working for Swansea City, Tucker was replaced by Sevilla goalkeeping coach Javier García on 27 June 2014.

Tucker then took up the position as the goalkeeper coach of England under-20s managed by Aidy Boothroyd and the academy goalkeeping coach/consultant at Birmingham City.

On 16 March 2015, Tucker joined Dick Advocaat's staff at Sunderland, following the dismissal of Gus Poyet, and helped secure Premier League survival. He has since worked under Sam Allardyce, David Moyes, Simon Grayson and Chris Coleman. He returned to Swansea City in June 2018 as Graham Potter's goalkeeping coach. He left the club in June 2019 and joined Bristol Rovers in July 2019.

On 26 August 2021, Tucker was confirmed as a goalkeeping coach with the England National Men Teams.
