= 2012–13 Football League Cup =

Capital One Cup, League Cup

Tournament details
- Country: England; Wales
- Dates: 11 August 2012 – 24 February 2013
- Teams: 92

Final positions
- Champions: Swansea City (1st title)
- Runners-up: Bradford City

Tournament statistics
- Matches played: 91
- Goals scored: 321 (3.53 per match)
- Top goal scorer(s): Theo Walcott (5 goals)

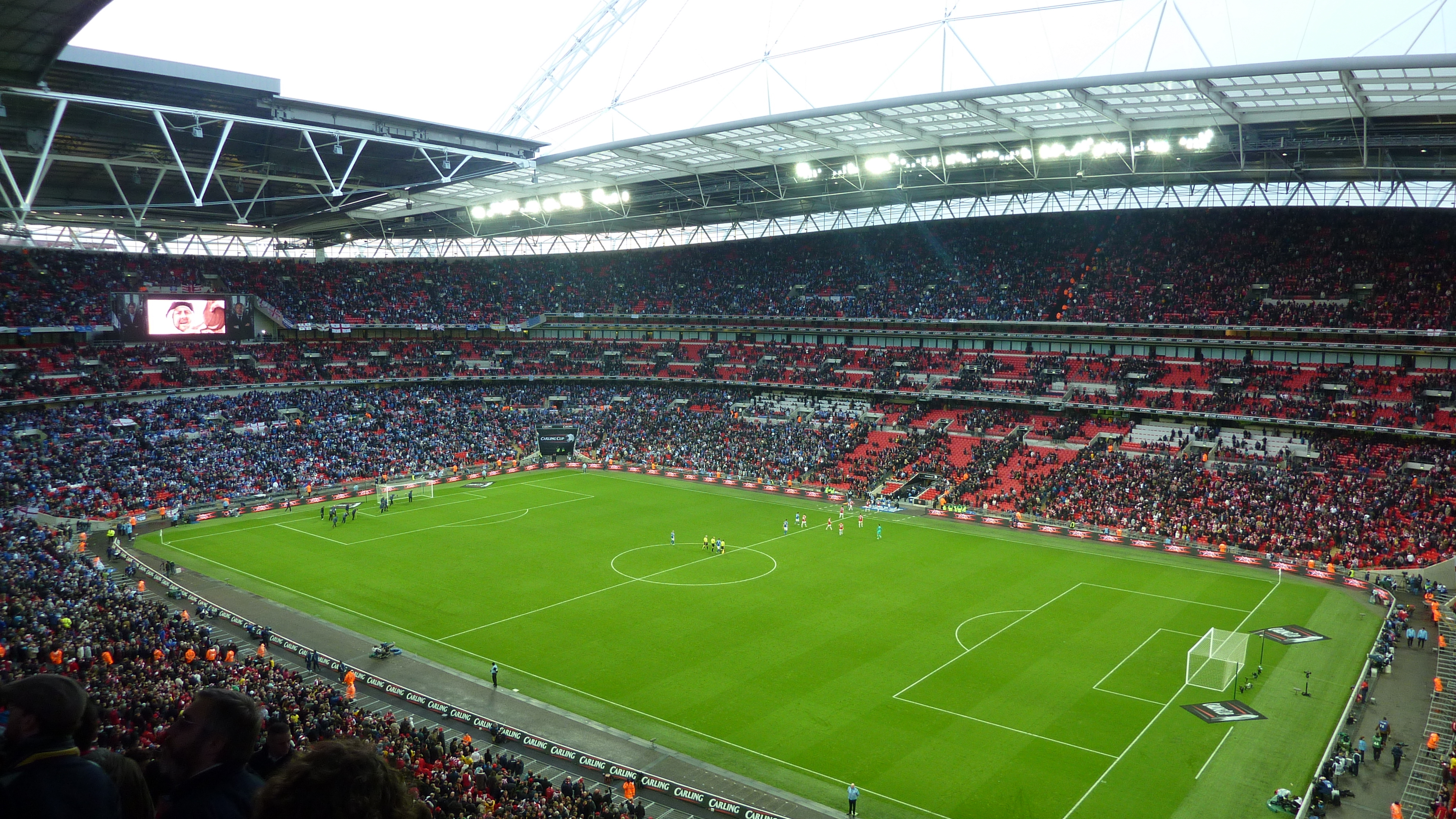

The 2012–13 Football League Cup (known as the Capital One Cup for sponsorship reasons) was the 53rd season of the Football League Cup, a knock-out competition for the top 92 football clubs played in English football league system. Liverpool were the defending champions, having beaten Cardiff City in the 2012 final. They were knocked out in the fourth round by Swansea City.

The final was won by Swansea by 5–0 against Bradford City at Wembley Stadium on 24 February 2013. Bradford were the first team from the fourth tier of English football to appear in a League Cup final since 1962. Swansea was the first Welsh club to win the League Cup and the first Welsh club to win an English club competition since Cardiff City's 1926–27 FA Cup triumph. Swansea qualified for the third qualifying round of the 2013–14 UEFA Europa League through England's berth by winning the cup.

== First round ==
The draw for the first round took place on 14 June 2012 at 09:30 BST. The 35 matches were to be played on 13–15 August 2012, although if both teams agreed, they could play it on 11 or 12 August instead.

=== Northern section ===
11 August 2012	Rochdale (4)	3–4 (a.e.t.)	Barnsley (2)	Spotland, Rochdale
15:00 BST	Tutte 6'; Kennedy 90+4' (pen.), 105+2'	Report	Stones 45'; Davies 79'; Dagnall 95', 105'	Attendance: 2,709; Referee: Gary Sutton

11 August 2012	Notts County (3)	0–1 (a.e.t.)	Bradford City (4)	Meadow Lane, Nottingham
15:00 BST		Report	Hanson 95'	Attendance: 3,460; Referee: Darren Deadman

11 August 2012	Hull City (2)	1–1 (a.e.t.) (7–6 p)	Rotherham United (4)	KC Stadium, Kingston upon Hull
15:00 BST	McLean 70'	Report	Ainsworth 52'	Attendance: 6,569; Referee: Darren Sheldrake
	Penalties
	Fryatt (penalty scored); Koren (penalty scored); McLean (penalty scored); Proschwitz (penalty scored); Chester (penalty scored); Stewart (penalty scored); Cairney (penalty scored)		(penalty scored) Noble; (penalty scored) Mullins; (penalty scored) Agard; (penalty scored) Árnason; (penalty scored) Pringle; (penalty scored) Taylor; (penalty missed) Bradley

11 August 2012	Carlisle United (3)	1–0	Accrington Stanley (4)	Brunton Park, Carlisle
15:00 BST	Robson 39'	Report		Attendance: 2,924; Referee: Nigel Miller

11 August 2012	Doncaster Rovers (3)	1–1 (a.e.t.) (4–2 p)	York City (4)	Keepmoat Stadium, Doncaster
15:00 BST	Brown 74' (pen.)	Report	Coulson 65'	Attendance: 4,937; Referee: Graham Salisbury
	Penalties
	Brown (penalty scored); Woods (penalty scored); Bennett (penalty scored); Blake (penalty scored)		(penalty missed) Coulson; (penalty scored) Challinor; (penalty scored) Potts; (penalty missed) Blair

11 August 2012	Crewe Alexandra (3)	5–0	Hartlepool United (3)	Alexandra Stadium, Crewe
15:00 BST	Leitch-Smith 7'; Clayton 13', 39'; Pogba 34', 90+1'	Report		Attendance: 2,501; Referee: Carl Boyeson

11 August 2012	Bury (3)	1–2	Middlesbrough (2)	Gigg Lane, Bury
15:00 BST	Hughes 64'	Report	Emnes 33'; Ledesma 61'	Attendance: 2,964; Referee: Mick Russell

11 August 2012	Sheffield United (3)	2–2 (a.e.t.) (4–5 p)	Burton Albion (4)	Bramall Lane, Sheffield
15:00 BST	Blackman 51'; Collins 105'	Report	Yussuf 34'; Taylor 97'	Attendance: 7,073; Referee: Trevor Kettle
	Penalties
	Quinn (penalty scored); Collins (penalty scored); Maguire (penalty missed); McDonald (penalty scored); McMahon (penalty scored); Doyle (penalty missed)		(penalty scored) Weir; (penalty missed) Bell; (penalty scored) McCrory; (penalty scored) Webster; (penalty scored) Richards; (penalty scored) Taylor

11 August 2012	Leeds United (2)	4–0	Shrewsbury Town (3)	Elland Road, Leeds
15:00 BST	Becchio 20'; Varney 26'; Norris 66'; McCormack 70' (pen.)	Report		Attendance: 18,194; Referee: Mark Haywood

12 August 2012	Blackpool (2)	1–2	Morecambe (4)	Bloomfield Road, Blackpool
15:00 BST	Baptiste 77'	Report	Alessandra 6'; Fleming 56'	Attendance: 6,083; Referee: Paul Tierny

13 August 2012	Fleetwood Town (4)	0–1	Nottingham Forest (2)	Highbury Stadium, Fleetwood
19:45 BST		Report	Blackstock 57'	Attendance: 3,611; Referee: Michael Naylor

13 August 2012	Preston North End (3)	2–0	Huddersfield Town (2)	Deepdale, Preston
19:45 BST	King 29'; Wroe 40'	Report		Attendance: 5,500; Referee: Rob Lewis

13 August 2012	Oldham Athletic (3)	2–4	Sheffield Wednesday (2)	Boundary Park, Oldham
19:45 BST	Slew 7'; Mvoto 27'	Report	J. Johnson 53'; O'Grady 62', 70'; Antonio 87'	Attendance: 3,474; Referee: Eddie Ilderton

14 August 2012	Derby County (2)	5–5 (a.e.t.) (6–7 p)	Scunthorpe United (3)	Pride Park Stadium, Derby
19:45 BST	Keogh 30'; Buxton 34', 53'; Robinson 40'; Tyson 83'	Report	Barcham 52'; Grella 63'; Grant 73', 90+7' (pen.); Jennings 90+5'	Attendance: 4,724; Referee: Dean Mohareb
	Penalties
	Davies (penalty missed); Tyson (penalty scored); Brayford (penalty missed); Keogh (penalty scored); Robinson (penalty scored); Jacobs (penalty scored); Coutts (penalty scored); Buxton (penalty scored); Naylor (penalty missed)		(penalty missed) Grella; (penalty scored) Kennedy; (penalty scored) Walker; (penalty missed) Duffy; (penalty scored) Grant; (penalty scored) Newey; (penalty scored) Ryan; (penalty scored) Mirfin; (penalty scored) Jennings

14 August 2012	Port Vale (4)	1–3	Burnley (2)	Vale Park, Stoke-on-Trent
19:45 BST	Shuker 9'	Report	McCann 11'; Austin 29'; Marney 42'	Attendance: 4,055; Referee: Andy Haines

14 August 2012	Chesterfield (4)	1–2 (a.e.t.)	Tranmere Rovers (3)	B2net Stadium, Chesterfield
19:45 BST	Lester 109'	Report	Stockton 93'; Bell-Baggie 120+2'	Attendance: 3,088; Referee: David Webb

=== Southern section ===
11 August 2012	Cheltenham Town (4)	1–1 (a.e.t.) (3–5 p)	Milton Keynes Dons (3)	Abbey Business Stadium, Cheltenham
15:00 BST	Mohamed 58'	Report	Bowditch 45+2'	Attendance: 1,660; Referee: Steve Rushton
	Penalties
	Jones (penalty scored); Duffy (penalty missed); Harrad (penalty scored); Mohamed (penalty scored)		(penalty scored) Bowditch; (penalty scored) MacDonald; (penalty scored) MacKenzie; (penalty scored) Kay; (penalty scored) Lowe

11 August 2012	Wolverhampton Wanderers (2)	1–1 (a.e.t.) (7–6 p)	Aldershot Town (4)	Molineux, Wolverhampton
15:00 BST	Ebanks-Blake 53'	Report	Rankine 62'	Attendance: 11,555; Referee: James Adcock
	Penalties
	Ebanks-Blake (penalty scored); Hunt (penalty scored); Ward (penalty scored); Johnson (penalty scored); Henry (penalty scored); Nouble (penalty scored); Forde (penalty scored)		(penalty scored) Payne; (penalty scored) Reid; (penalty scored) Rankine; (penalty scored) Rodman; (penalty scored) Herd; (penalty scored) Morris; (penalty missed) Roberts

11 August 2012	Walsall (3)	1–0	Brentford (3)	Banks's Stadium, Walsall
15:00 BST	Hemmings 8'	Report		Attendance: 2,248; Referee: Andy Woolmer

11 August 2012	Watford (2)	1–0 (a.e.t.)	Wycombe Wanderers (4)	Vicarage Road, Watford
15:00 BST	Iwelumo 109'	Report		Attendance: 5,343; Referee: Carl Berry

14 August 2012	Ipswich Town (2)	3–1	Bristol Rovers (4)	Portman Road, Ipswich
19:45 BST	Scotland 40'; Smith 56'; Cresswell 84'	Report	Smith 26'	Attendance: 8,645; Referee: Fred Graham

14 August 2012	Stevenage (3)	3–1	AFC Wimbledon (4)	The Lamex Stadium, Stevenage
19:45 BST	Balkestein 14' (o.g.); Dunne 38'; Roberts 45+2'	Report	Kiernan 41'	Attendance: 2,018; Referee: Stuart Attwell

14 August 2012	Exeter City (4)	1–2	Crystal Palace (2)	St James Park, Exeter
19:45 BST	O'Flynn 2'	Report	Easter 24' (pen.); Dikgacoi 43'	Attendance: 3,650; Referee: Phil Gibbs

14 August 2012	Yeovil Town (3)	3–0	Colchester United (3)	Huish Park, Yeovil
19:45 BST	Hinds 4', 44'; Marsh-Brown 79'	Report		Attendance: 1,907; Referee: Simon Hooper

14 August 2012	Birmingham City (2)	5–1	Barnet (4)	St Andrew's, Birmingham
19:45 BST	King 38' (pen.); Caldwell 49'; Ambrose 54'; Løvenkrands 90+1'; Elliott 90+4'	Report	Nurse 31'	Attendance: 9,905; Referee: Lee Collins

14 August 2012	Bristol City (2)	1–2	Gillingham (4)	Ashton Gate, Bristol
19:45 BST	Elliott 90+5'	Report	Kedwell 45+1' (pen.); Strevens 54'	Attendance: 4,339; Referee: David Coote

14 August 2012	Northampton Town (4)	2–1	Cardiff City (2)	Sixfields Stadium, Northampton
19:45 BST	Artell 37'; Nicholls 48'	Report	Helguson 4' (pen.)	Attendance: 2,819; Referee: David Phillips

14 August 2012	Plymouth Argyle (4)	3–0	Portsmouth (3)	Home Park, Plymouth
19:45 BST	Gorman 45'; Cowan-Hall 86'; Chadwick 87'	Report		Attendance: 5,318; Referee: Brendan Malone

14 August 2012	Millwall (2)	2–2 (a.e.t.) (1–4 p)	Crawley Town (3)	The Den, London
19:45 BST	Ward 23'; Batt 85'	Report	Akpan 16'; Adams 56'	Attendance: 4,050; Referee: Dean Whitestone
	Penalties
	Henderson (penalty missed); Smith (penalty missed); Trotter (penalty scored)		(penalty scored) Alexander; (penalty scored) Bulman; (penalty scored) McFadzean; (penalty scored) Hunt

14 August 2012	Torquay United (4)	0–4	Leicester City (2)	Plainmoor, Torquay
19:45 BST		Report	Dyer 21'; Marshall 36'; James 50'; Vardy 77'	Attendance: 3,367; Referee: Oliver Langford

14 August 2012	Dagenham & Redbridge (4)	0–1	Coventry City (3)	Victoria Road, London
19:45 BST		Report	Kilbane 90' (pen.)	Attendance: 1,904; Referee: Iain Williamson

14 August 2012	Peterborough United (2)	4–0	Southend United (4)	London Road, Peterborough
19:45 BST	Tomlin 12'; Taylor 28'; Newell 29'; Boyd 58'	Report		Attendance: 3,225; Referee: Mark Brown

14 August 2012	Swindon Town (3)	3–0	Brighton & Hove Albion (2)	County Ground, Swindon
19:45 BST	Benson 53'; Navarro 64', 75'	Report		Attendance: 5,737; Referee: Andy D'Urso

14 August 2012	Charlton Athletic (2)	1–1 (a.e.t.) (3–4 p)	Leyton Orient (3)	The Valley, London
19:45 BST	Wagstaff 28'	Report	Baudry 45+1'	Attendance: 5,914; Referee: Gavin Ward
	Penalties
	Jackson (penalty missed); Wilson (penalty missed); Green (penalty scored); Wright-Phillips (penalty scored); Pritchard (penalty scored)		(penalty scored) Symes; (penalty scored) Sawyer; (penalty missed) Chorley; (penalty scored) James; (penalty scored) Brunt

14 August 2012	Oxford United (4)	0–0 (a.e.t.) (5–3 p)	Bournemouth (3)	Kassam Stadium, Oxford
19:45 BST		Report		Attendance: 3,788; Referee: Darren Drysdale
	Penalties
	Craddock (penalty scored); Smalley (penalty scored); Rigg (penalty scored); Chapman (penalty scored); Batt (penalty scored)		(penalty scored) Daniels; (penalty scored) McDermott; (penalty missed) Pugh; (penalty scored) Grabban

== Second round ==
The draw for the second round took place on 15 August 2012, after all the matches for the first round had been completed. The second round draw included the 35 winners from the first round plus the Premier League clubs that are not competing in European competitions: the UEFA Champions League and UEFA Europa League. The second round draw also included the top two highest ranked teams from last season not currently in the Premier League, these being Blackburn Rovers and Bolton Wanderers.

The 25 ties took place on 28–30 August 2012.

28 August 2012	Preston North End (3)	4–1	Crystal Palace (2)	Deepdale, Preston
19:45 BST	Wroe 2', 63'; Sodje 18'; Monakana 41'	Report	Wilbraham 37'	Attendance: 5,194; Referee: Eddie Ilderton

28 August 2012	Watford (2)	1–2	Bradford City (4)	Vicarage Road, Watford
19:45 BST	Anya 71'	Report	Reid 84'; Thompson 90+4'	Attendance: 5,560; Referee: Christopher Sarginson

28 August 2012	Swansea City (1)	3–1	Barnsley (2)	Liberty Stadium, Swansea
19:45 BST	Graham 24'; Moore 59', 88'	Report	Hassell 69'	Attendance: 9,025; Referee: Simon Hooper

28 August 2012	Yeovil Town (3)	2–4	West Bromwich Albion (1)	Huish Park, Yeovil
19:45 BST	Reid 15', 48'	Report	Brunt 39'; Long 45+1', 81'; El Ghanassy 73'	Attendance: 6,228; Referee: Darren Sheldrake

28 August 2012	Coventry City (3)	3–2 (a.e.t.)	Birmingham City (2)	Ricoh Arena, Coventry
19:45 BST	McDonald 20'; Kilbane 22'; Baker 97'	Report	Løvenkrands 4'; Spector 44'	Attendance: 10,859; Referee: Dean Whitestone

28 August 2012	West Ham United (1)	2–0	Crewe Alexandra (3)	Upton Park, London
19:45 BST	Maynard 34'; Maïga 55'	Report		Attendance: 18,053; Referee: Fred Graham

28 August 2012	Doncaster Rovers (3)	3–2	Hull City (2)	Keepmoat Stadium, Doncaster
19:45 BST	Syers 30' 90+2'; Jones 57'	Report	McLean 1'; Simpson 10'	Attendance: 4,703; Referee: Steven Rushton

28 August 2012	Carlisle United (3)	2–1 (a.e.t.)	Ipswich Town (2)	Brunton Park, Carlisle
19:45 BST	Beck 90'; Symington 99'	Report	Luongo 23'	Attendance: 3,296; Referee: Scott Mathieson

28 August 2012	Reading (1)	3–2	Peterborough United (2)	Madejski Stadium, Reading
20:00 BST	Pogrebnyak 16'; Gunter 19'; Knight-Percival 38' (o.g.)	Report	Taylor 12'; Tomlin 17'	Attendance: 7,262; Referee: Andy D'Urso

28 August 2012	Sheffield Wednesday (2)	1–0	Fulham (1)	Hillsborough, Sheffield
19:45 BST	Madine 50' (pen.)	Report		Attendance: 14,177; Referee: Paul Tierney

28 August 2012	Leicester City (2)	2–4	Burton Albion (4)	King Power Stadium, Leicester
19:45 BST	Knockaert 60'; Futács 87'	Report	Palmer 20'; Taylor 53'; Weir 64' (pen.); Maghoma 68'	Attendance: 8,560; Referee: Darren Drysdale

28 August 2012	Burnley (2)	1–1 (a.e.t.) (3–2 p)	Plymouth Argyle (4)	Turf Moor, Burnley
19:45 BST	Austin 37'	Report	Williams 90' (pen.)	Attendance: 4,119; Referee: Andrew Madley
	Penalties
	Wallace (penalty missed); Vokes (penalty scored); Stanislas (penalty missed); Hewitt (penalty scored); Stock (penalty scored)		(penalty missed) Williams; (penalty missed) Young; (penalty scored) Lecointe; (penalty missed) Hourihane; (penalty scored) Blanchard

28 August 2012	Queens Park Rangers (1)	3–0	Walsall (3)	Loftus Road, London
19:45 BST	Wright-Phillips 29'; Zamora 66'; Bosingwa 84'	Report		Attendance: 6,129; Referee: Michael Naylor

28 August 2012	Stevenage (3)	1–4	Southampton (1)	Broadhall Way, Stevenage
19:45 BST	Thalassitis 90+2'	Report	Lee 53'; Sharp 74'; Puncheon 76'; Reeves 90+3'	Attendance: 3,062; Referee: Oliver Langford

28 August 2012	Nottingham Forest (2)	1–4	Wigan Athletic (1)	City Ground, Nottingham
19:45 BST	Cox 47'	Report	Boselli 25'; Figueroa 35'; Gómez 44'; McManaman 90'	Attendance: 7,545; Referee: Geoff Eltringham

28 August 2012	Stoke City (1)	3–4 (a.e.t.)	Swindon Town (3)	Britannia Stadium, Stoke-on-Trent
19:45 BST	Jones 63'; Walters 86'; Crouch 111'	Report	Collins 27', 41', 119'; Flint 105+4'	Attendance: 9,147; Referee: Nigel Miller

28 August 2012	Aston Villa (1)	3–0	Tranmere Rovers (3)	Villa Park, Birmingham
19:45 BST	Delph 38'; Herd 66'; Bent 81'	Report		Attendance: 15,319; Referee: James Adcock

28 August 2012	Crawley Town (3)	2–1	Bolton Wanderers (2)	Broadfield Stadium, Crawley
19:45 BST	Clarke 81'; Ajose 90+2'	Report	Afobe 21'	Attendance: 2,678; Referee: Graham Scott

28 August 2012	Gillingham (4)	0–2	Middlesbrough (2)	Priestfield Stadium, Gillingham
19:45 BST		Report	Carayol 23'; Park 90'	Attendance: 5,146; Referee: Gavin Ward

28 August 2012	Milton Keynes Dons (3)	2–1	Blackburn Rovers (2)	Stadium mk, Milton Keynes
19:45 BST	Chadwick 52', 68'	Report	Goodwillie 83'	Attendance: 5,873; Referee: Mick Russell

28 August 2012	Leeds United (2)	3–0	Oxford United (4)	Elland Road, Leeds
19:45 BST	Austin 26'; Byram 34'; Lees 74'	Report		Attendance: 13,713; Referee: Gary Sutton (referee)

28 August 2012	Sunderland (1)	2–0	Morecambe (4)	Stadium of Light, Sunderland
19:45 BST	McClean 24', 65'	Report		Attendance: 22,871; Referee: Bobby Madley

28 August 2012	Norwich City (1)	2–1	Scunthorpe United (3)	Carrow Road, Norwich
19:45 BST	Lappin 32'; Hoolahan 56' (pen.)	Report	Duffy 34'	Attendance: 13,116; Referee: Chris Foy

29 August 2012	Everton (1)	5–0	Leyton Orient (3)	Goodison Park, Liverpool
19:45 BST	Mirallas 16', 29'; Osman 22'; Anichebe 35'; Gueye 67'	Report		Attendance: 24,124; Referee: Roger East

30 August 2012	Northampton Town (4)	1–3	Wolverhampton Wanderers (2)	Sixfields, Northampton
19:45 BST	Platt 40'	Report	Batth 16'; Nouble 45+1'; Sako 90+1'	Attendance: 3,758; Referee: Darren Deadman

== Third round ==
The draw for the third round was made on 30 August 2012, following the televised second round match between Northampton Town and Wolverhampton Wanderers. The seven English teams playing in European competitions during the season – Arsenal, Chelsea, Liverpool, Manchester City, Manchester United, Newcastle United and Tottenham Hotspur – entered at this stage, while the other 25 teams had all progressed from the second round.

The 16 ties took place on 25–26 September 2012.

25 September 2012	Swindon Town (3)	3–1	Burnley (2)	County Ground, Swindon
19.45 BST	Benson 19'; Williams 42'; Archibald-Henville 83'	Report	Austin 74'	Attendance: 7,353; Referee: Neil Adcock

25 September 2012	West Ham United (1)	1–4	Wigan Athletic (1)	Upton Park, London
19.45 BST	Maïga 7'	Report	Boselli 14', 41'; Ramis 38'; Gómez 84' (pen.)	Attendance: 25,934; Referee: Craig Pawson

25 September 2012	Leeds United (2)	2–1	Everton (1)	Elland Road, Leeds
19.45 BST	White 4'; Austin 70'	Report	Distin 81'	Attendance: 21,164; Referee: Lee Mason

25 September 2012	Preston North End (3)	1–3	Middlesbrough (2)	Deepdale, Preston
19:45 BST	King 40'	Report	Ledesma 13'; Zemmama 18'; Smallwood 61'	Attendance: 4,959; Referee: Keith Stroud

25 September 2012	Southampton (1)	2–0	Sheffield Wednesday (2)	St Mary's Stadium, Southampton
19:45 BST	Rodriguez 30', 78' (pen.)	Report		Attendance: 9,890; Referee: Mark Halsey

25 September 2012	Chelsea (1)	6–0	Wolverhampton Wanderers (2)	Stamford Bridge, London
19:45 BST	Cahill 4'; Bertrand 7'; Mata 17'; Romeu 53' (pen.); Torres 57'; Moses 71'	Report		Attendance: 32,569; Referee: Neil Swarbrick

25 September 2012	Crawley Town (3)	2–3	Swansea City (1)	Broadfield Stadium, Crawley
19:45 BST	Simpson 45+1'; Akpan 62'	Report	Michu 27'; Graham 74'; Monk 90+2'	Attendance: 3,963; Referee: Bobby Madley

25 September 2012	Bradford City (4)	3–2 (a.e.t.)	Burton Albion (4)	Valley Parade, Bradford
19:45 BST	Wells 83', 90'; Darby 115'	Report	Kee 18'; Webster 29'	Attendance: 4,178; Referee: Nigel Miller

25 September 2012	Manchester City (1)	2–4 (a.e.t.)	Aston Villa (1)	Etihad Stadium, Manchester
19:45 BST	Balotelli 27'; Kolarov 64'	Report	Barry 59' (o.g.); Agbonlahor 70', 113'; N'Zogbia 96'	Attendance: 28,015; Referee: Phil Dowd

25 September 2012	Milton Keynes Dons (3)	0–2	Sunderland (1)	Stadium mk, Milton Keynes
19:45 BST		Report	Gardner 54'; McClean 82'	Attendance: 10,489; Referee: Stuart Attwell

26 September 2012	Manchester United (1)	2–1	Newcastle United (1)	Old Trafford, Manchester
19:45 BST	Anderson 44'; Cleverley 58'	Report	Cissé 62'	Attendance: 46,358; Referee: Anthony Taylor

26 September 2012	Queens Park Rangers (1)	2–3	Reading (1)	Loftus Road, London
19:45 BST	Hoilett 14'; Cissé 71'	Report	Gorkšs 16'; Shorey 76'; Pogrebnyak 81'	Attendance: 11,562; Referee: Roger East

26 September 2012	Norwich City (1)	1–0	Doncaster Rovers (3)	Carrow Road, Norwich
19:45 BST	Tettey 26'	Report		Attendance: 13,902; Referee: Darren Deadman

26 September 2012	West Bromwich Albion (1)	1–2	Liverpool (1)	The Hawthorns, West Bromwich
20:00 BST	Tamaș 3'	Report	Şahin 17', 82'	Attendance: 21,164; Referee: Michael Oliver

26 September 2012	Arsenal (1)	6–1	Coventry City (3)	Emirates Stadium, London
19:45 BST	Giroud 39'; Oxlade-Chamberlain 57'; Arshavin 63'; Walcott 74', 90'; Miquel 80'	Report	Ball 78'	Attendance: 58,351; Referee: Mike Jones

26 September 2012	Carlisle United (3)	0–3	Tottenham Hotspur (1)	Brunton Park, Carlisle
19:45 BST		Report	Vertonghen 37'; Townsend 53'; Sigurðsson 89'	Attendance: 12,625; Referee: Kevin Friend

== Fourth round ==
The draw for the fourth round was made on 26 September 2012, following the televised Third Round match between Manchester United and Newcastle United. All teams participating in the Fourth Round progressed from the third round.

The ties took place on 30–31 October 2012.

30 October 2012	Swindon Town (3)	2–3	Aston Villa (1)	County Ground, Swindon
19:45 GMT	Storey 78', 81'	Report	Benteke 30', 90'; Agbonlahor 39'	Attendance: 14,434; Referee: Stuart Attwell

30 October 2012	Wigan Athletic (1)	0–0 (a.e.t.) (2–4 p)	Bradford City (4)	DW Stadium, Wigan
19:45 GMT		Report		Attendance: 11,777; Referee: Roger East
	Penalties
	Jones (penalty scored); Watson (penalty scored); Maloney (penalty missed); Gómez (penalty missed)		(penalty scored) Doyle; (penalty scored) G. Jones; (penalty scored) Darby; (penalty scored) Connell

30 October 2012	Leeds United (2)	3–0	Southampton (1)	Elland Road, Leeds
19:45 GMT	Tonge 35'; Diouf 88'; Becchio 90+3' (pen.)	Report		Attendance: 17,002; Referee: Chris Foy

30 October 2012	Reading (1)	5–7 (a.e.t.)	Arsenal (1)	Madejski Stadium, Reading
19:45 GMT	Roberts 12'; Koscielny 18' (o.g.); Leigertwood 20'; Hunt 37'; Pogrebnyak 116'	Report	Walcott 45+2', 90+6', 120+1'; Giroud 64'; Koscielny 89'; Chamakh 103', 120+3'	Attendance: 23,980; Referee: Kevin Friend

30 October 2012	Sunderland (1)	0–1	Middlesbrough (2)	Stadium of Light, Sunderland
19:45 GMT		Report	McDonald 39'	Attendance: 32,535; Referee: Phil Dowd

31 October 2012	Chelsea (1)	5–4 (a.e.t.)	Manchester United (1)	Stamford Bridge, London
19:45 GMT	David Luiz 31' (pen.); Cahill 52'; Hazard 90+4' (pen.); Sturridge 97'; Ramires 116'	Report	Giggs 22', 120' (pen.); Hernández 43'; Nani 59'	Attendance: 41,126; Referee: Lee Mason

31 October 2012	Norwich City (1)	2–1	Tottenham Hotspur (1)	Carrow Road, Norwich
19:45 GMT	Vertonghen 84' (o.g.); Jackson 87'	Report	Bale 66'	Attendance: 16,465; Referee: Jonathan Moss

31 October 2012	Liverpool (1)	1–3	Swansea City (1)	Anfield, Liverpool
20:00 GMT	Suárez 76'	Report	Flores 34'; Dyer 72'; De Guzmán 90+4'	Attendance: 37,521; Referee: Lee Probert

== Quarter-finals ==
The draw for the quarter-finals took place on 31 October 2012 after the televised game between Chelsea and Manchester United. Bradford City are the lowest ranked team, as the only team from League Two.

Three of the ties were played on 11 and 12 December 2012. Due to their involvement at the FIFA Club World Cup, Chelsea played their match the following week.

11 December 2012	Norwich City (1)	1–4	Aston Villa (1)	Carrow Road, Norwich
19:45 GMT	Morison 19'	Report	Holman 21'; Weimann 79', 85'; Benteke 90'	Attendance: 26,142; Referee: Michael Oliver

11 December 2012	Bradford City (4)	1–1 (a.e.t.) (3–2 p)	Arsenal (1)	Valley Parade, Bradford
19:45 GMT	Thompson 16'	Report	Vermaelen 88'	Attendance: 23,971; Referee: Mike Dean
	Penalties
	Doyle (penalty scored); G. Jones (penalty scored); Darby (penalty missed); Connell (penalty scored); R. Jones (penalty missed)		(penalty missed) Cazorla; (penalty missed) Chamakh; (penalty scored) Wilshere; (penalty scored) Oxlade-Chamberlain; (penalty missed) Vermaelen

12 December 2012	Swansea City (1)	1–0	Middlesbrough (2)	Liberty Stadium, Swansea
19:45 GMT	Hines 81' (o.g.)	Report		Attendance: 15,048; Referee: Lee Probert

19 December 2012	Leeds United (2)	1–5	Chelsea (1)	Elland Road, Leeds
19:45 GMT	Becchio 37'	Report	Mata 47'; Ivanović 64'; Moses 66'; Hazard 81'; Torres 83'	Attendance: 33,816; Referee: Andre Marriner

== Semi-finals ==
The draw for the semi-finals took place on 19 December 2012 after the televised game between Leeds United and Chelsea. Bradford City happened to be the only team from outside the Premiership as they were playing in the lowest tier of English League football, the Football League Two, at the time.

=== First leg ===
8 January 2013	Bradford City (4)	3–1	Aston Villa (1)	Valley Parade, Bradford
19:45 GMT	Wells 19'; McArdle 77'; McHugh 88'	Report	Weimann 82'	Attendance: 22,245; Referee: Howard Webb

9 January 2013	Chelsea (1)	0–2	Swansea City (1)	Stamford Bridge, London
19:45 GMT		Report	Michu 39'; Graham 90+1'	Attendance: 40,172; Referee: Anthony Taylor

=== Second leg ===
22 January 2013	Aston Villa (1)	2–1 (3–4 agg.)	Bradford City (4)	Villa Park, Birmingham
19:45 GMT	Benteke 24'; Weimann 89'	Report	Hanson 55'	Attendance: 40,193; Referee: Phil Dowd

23 January 2013	Swansea City (1)	0–0 (2–0 agg.)	Chelsea (1)	Liberty Stadium, Swansea
19:45 GMT		Report		Attendance: 19,506; Referee: Chris Foy

== Final ==
24 February 2013
16:00 GMT

Bradford City	0–5	Swansea City
	Report	Dyer 16', 48'; Michu 40'; De Guzmán 59' (pen.), 90+1'

Wembley Stadium, London
Attendance: 82,597
Referee: Kevin Friend (Leicestershire)

== Statistics ==
Top goalscorers

Rank	Player	Club	Goals
1	(England) Theo Walcott	Arsenal	5
2	(Belgium) Christian Benteke	Aston Villa	4
2	(Austria) Andreas Weimann	Aston Villa	4
4	(England) Gabriel Agbonlahor	Aston Villa	3
4	(England) Charlie Austin	Burnley	3
4	(Argentina) Luciano Becchio	Leeds United	3
4	(Argentina) Mauro Boselli	Wigan Athletic	3
4	(Republic of Ireland) James Collins	Swindon Town	3
4	(England) Nathan Dyer	Swansea City	3
4	(England) Danny Graham	Swansea City	3
4	(Netherlands) Jonathan de Guzmán	Swansea City	3
4	(Republic of Ireland) James McClean	Sunderland	3
4	(Spain) Michu	Swansea City	3
4	(Russia) Pavel Pogrebnyak	Reading	3
4	(Bermuda) Nahki Wells	Bradford City	3
4	(England) Nicky Wroe	Preston North End	3

Top assists

Rank	Player	Club	Assists
1	(England) Michael Jacobs	Derby County	5
1	(England) Gary Jones	Bradford City	5
3	(Russia) Andrey Arshavin	Arsenal	4
3	(Belgium) Christian Benteke	Aston Villa	4
3	(Spain) Juan Mata	Chelsea	4
3	(England) Andy Williams	Swindon Town	4
7	(England) Darren Ambrose	Birmingham City	3
7	(Brazil) Anderson	Manchester United	3
7	(Northern Ireland) Chris Brunt	West Bromwich Albion	3
7	(Netherlands) Jonathan de Guzmán	Swansea City	3
7	(England) Jay Emmanuel-Thomas	Ipswich Town	3
7	(Wales) Chris Gunter	Reading	3
7	(Republic of Ireland) Stephen Ireland	Aston Villa	3
7	(Scotland) Jay McEveley	Swindon Town	3
7	(Nigeria) Victor Moses	Chelsea	3
7	(England) Wayne Routledge	Swansea City	3
7	(England) Theo Walcott	Arsenal	3

== Broadcasting rights ==
The domestic broadcasting rights for the competition were held by the subscription channel Sky Sports, who have held rights to the competition since 1996–97. During this season, Sky had exclusive live broadcasting rights, as the BBC lost the shared live rights it had in the previous season. The BBC could, however, show highlights of matches from each round.

These matches were broadcast live by Sky Sports on television:

Round	Live TV games
First round	Oldham Athletic vs Sheffield Wednesday, Swindon Town vs Brighton & Hove Albion
Second round	Nottingham Forest vs Wigan Athletic, Northampton Town vs Wolverhampton Wanderers
Third round	Leeds United vs Everton, Manchester United vs Newcastle United
Fourth round	Reading vs Arsenal, Chelsea vs Manchester United
Quarter-finals	Bradford City vs Arsenal, Leeds United vs Chelsea
Semi-finals (both legs)	All matches
Final	Bradford City vs Swansea City
