= Michu =

Spanish footballer (born 1986)

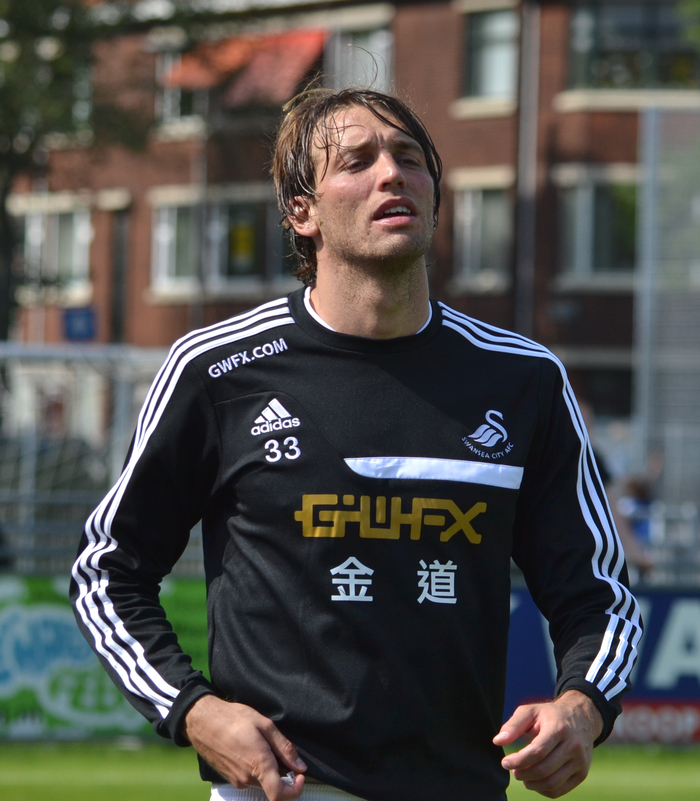
- Michu with Swansea City in 2013

Personal information
- Full name: Miguel Pérez Cuesta
- Date of birth: 21 March 1986 (age 40)
- Place of birth: Oviedo, Spain
- Height: 1.85 m (6 ft 1 in)
- Positions: Forward; attacking midfielder

Team information
- Current team: Burgos (director of football)

Youth career
- 1994–2003: Oviedo

Senior career*
Years	Team	Apps	(Gls)
2003–2007	Oviedo	95	(13)
2007–2008	Celta B	28	(10)
2008–2011	Celta	101	(14)
2011–2012	Rayo Vallecano	37	(15)
2012–2015	Swansea City	52	(20)
2014–2015	→ Napoli (loan)	3	(0)
2015–2016	Langreo	13	(10)
2016–2017	Oviedo	27	(1)
Total		356	(83)

International career
2013	Spain	1	(0)

Managerial career
- 2024: Burgos (caretaker)
- * Club domestic league appearances and goals

Miguel Pérez Cuesta (born 21 March 1986), known as Michu (Spanish pronunciation: [ˈmitʃu]), is a Spanish former professional footballer who played as a forward or attacking midfielder. He is the current director of football of Segunda División club Burgos.

He started playing for Real Oviedo, subsequently representing Celta and Rayo Vallecano, making his La Liga debut with the latter in 2011–12. In 2012 he signed with Swansea City, scoring 22 goals in all competitions in his first season and winning the League Cup.

Despite performances that earned him an international debut for Spain in 2013, Michu fell out of favour at Swansea due to several injury problems, being loaned to Napoli and released in November 2015. He appeared for Langreo and Oviedo before retiring.

== Club career ==
=== Oviedo and Celta ===
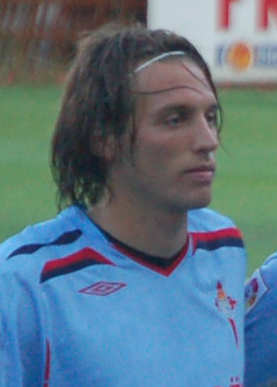
Michu with Celta in 2009

Michu was born in Oviedo, Asturias. After beginning with local Real Oviedo in the lower leagues, he moved to Celta B of Segunda División B in the middle of 2007; midway through his first season he received his maiden first-team call-up, eventually finishing in the starting XI of the Segunda División side.

In mid-January 2010, a transfer to La Liga with Sporting de Gijón in order to replace Birmingham City-bound Míchel was almost arranged, but it eventually fell through and Michu stayed at Celta. In his last two second-tier campaigns, he totalled 12 goals for the Galicians.

On 8 June 2011, after helping the club to sixth position in the regular season, Michu netted the game's only goal in the first leg of the promotion play-offs against Granada, at home; in the second leg, however, he missed his penalty shootout attempt and his team was eliminated (5–4).

=== Rayo Vallecano ===
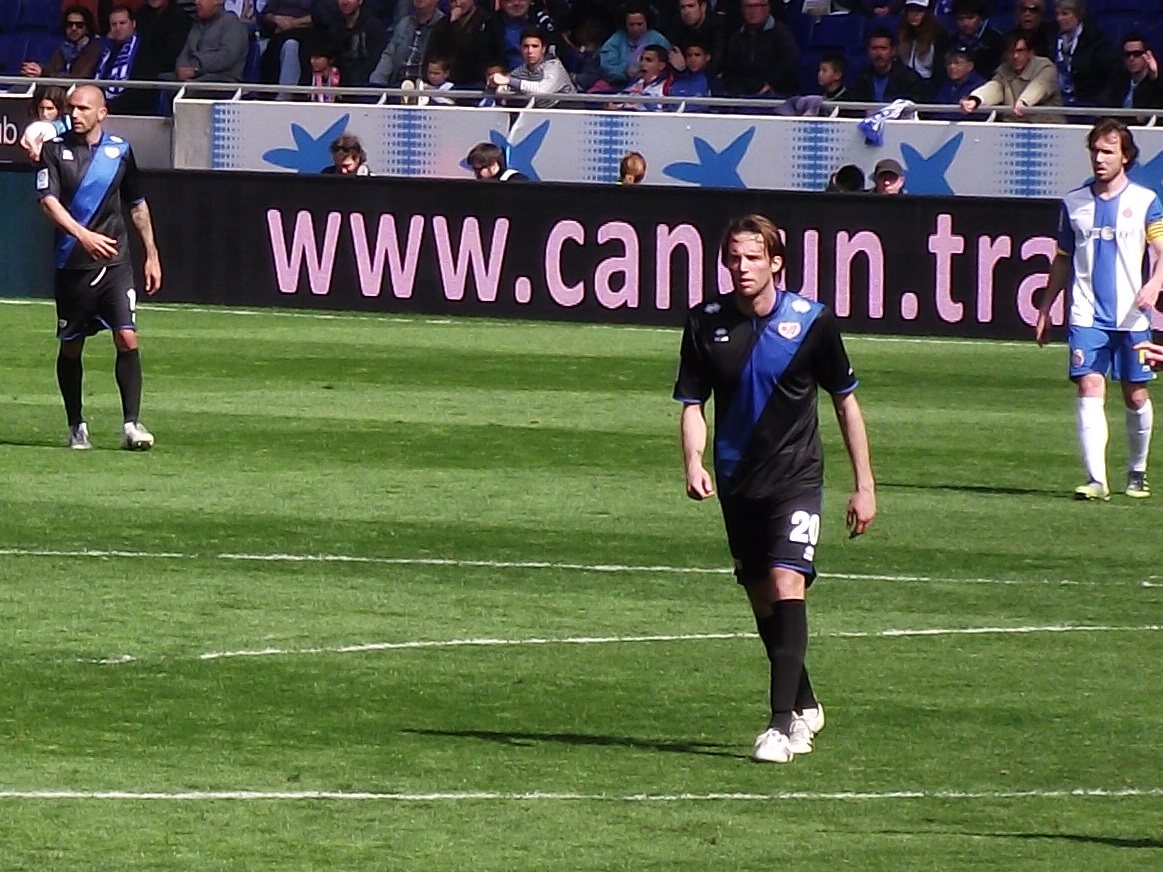
Michu playing with Rayo against Espanyol in March 2012

On 27 July 2011, after his contract with Celta expired, Michu signed a two-year deal with Rayo Vallecano, newly promoted to the top division. He made his debut in the competition on 28 August, in a 1–1 away draw with Athletic Bilbao.

Michu was one of the best national scorers in his first season (joint-ninth overall, best in the midfielder position), notably scoring braces against Real Sociedad (4–0 home win), Racing de Santander (4–2, home), Osasuna (6–0, home) and Real Madrid, the latter albeit in a 6–2 away loss.

=== Swansea City ===
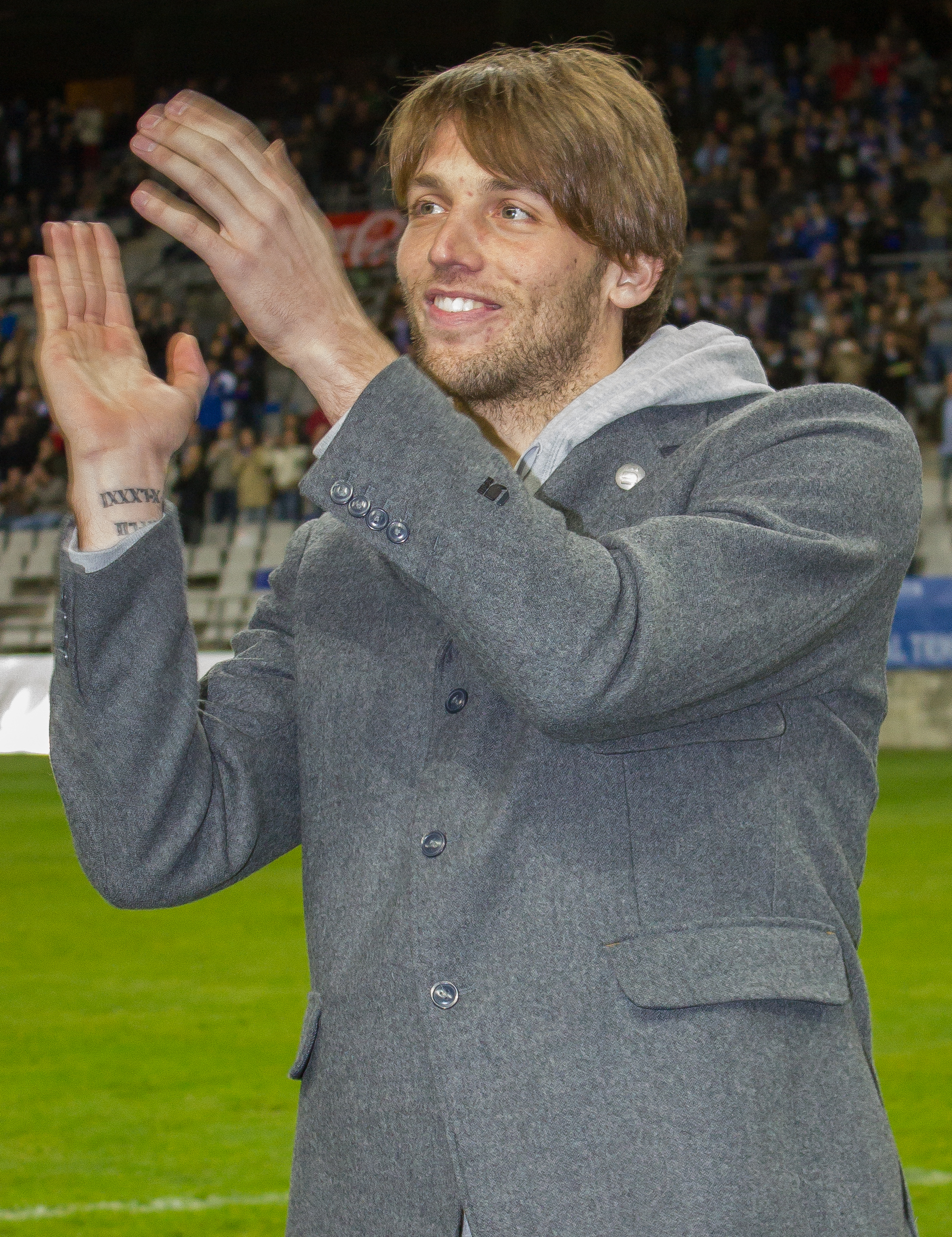
Michu in 2013

On 20 July 2012, Michu signed a three-year contract with Premier League side Swansea City for a fee of £2 million. Following the departure of Gylfi Sigurðsson, the club was looking for someone to fill the gap behind the striker in their 4–2–3–1 formation. He was given the number 9 shirt upon his transfer, and subsequently began featuring as a striker.

On his league debut on 18 August 2012, Michu scored twice and provided an assist for Scott Sinclair in a 5–0 away victory over Queens Park Rangers at Loftus Road. The first of his goals was also the first scored in the new top-flight season, and he later described his debut as "incredible".

Michu stayed atop the scoring charts by netting the second in a 3–0 home defeat of West Ham United on 25 August, and the second in the 2–2 draw against Sunderland the following matchday.

Michu scored his first FA Cup goal on 6 January 2013, coming off the bench in an eventual 2–2 home draw against Arsenal in the third round and finding the net a mere 73 seconds after entering the pitch. He followed this with another in his team's 2–0 win at Chelsea in the semi-finals of the Football League Cup.

On 23 January 2013, Michu signed a new four-year contract. On 24 February he scored the second in a 5–0 victory over Bradford City to help the side to win the League Cup for the first time in their history, in what was his 19th official goal of the campaign. he was subsequently named the team's Player of the Year, as well as the supporters Player of the Year.

Michu scored Swansea's first goal of 2013–14 on 1 August 2013, in the club's 4–0 home win against Malmö in the third qualifying round of the UEFA Europa League. In the play-off tie against Petrolul Ploiești later that month, he netted the second in a 5–1 victory, also at home. However, injuries limited his impact for much of the season.

=== Loan to Napoli and injuries ===
On 17 July 2014, Michu moved on loan to Napoli of Serie A, with the option of a permanent move. He made his debut for his new team on 31 August, coming on as an 85th-minute substitute for Lorenzo Insigne in a 2–1 win at Genoa.

A recurrence of his ankle injury meant that Michu could only play six competitive matches for the Italians, and having not appeared for Swansea since April 2014, he was released on 9 November 2015 through a financial settlement, with his contract due to expire the following summer.

=== Later career ===
Immediately after leaving Swansea, Michu joined Asturian amateurs Langreo. On 19 August 2016, he returned to his first club Oviedo, signing a one-year deal.

Michu officially announced his retirement from professional football on 25 July 2017 at the age of 31, due to the 'situation of [his] right ankle'. The previous week, he commented that he would like to stay connected with football.

Along with players such as Roque Santa Cruz and Amr Zaki, Michu was described as a 'one-season wonder' by sports outlets due to his performances in 2012–13, followed by his rapid decline thereafter.

== International career ==
On 22 December 2012, courtesy of his performances with Swansea, Vicente del Bosque said that Michu would play for Spain for the first time in a friendly with Uruguay on 6 February of the following year. However, he did not make the final squad for that match.

Michu was finally called up to the national team on 6 October 2013, as a replacement for the injured David Villa. He made his debut five days later, starting in a 2014 FIFA World Cup qualifier against Belarus in Palma de Mallorca (2–1 win).

== Post-retirement ==
On 3 June 2018, Michu was appointed as director of football of Langreo, where his brother acted as head coach. He left the position on 3 April 2019, to become the technical secretary of Oviedo. In December that year, he agreed to terminate his contract to join Burgos in the former capacity.

In October 2024, Michu named himself caretaker manager of Burgos in place of the sacked Bolo. His only match in charge was a 5–2 away win over Móstoles in the first round of the Copa del Rey.

== Personal life ==
In November 2012, along with fellow Premier League stars Santi Cazorla and Juan Mata, Michu bought shares in former club Oviedo as they struggled to raise €2 million to stay afloat in the Spanish third division. He spoke to the official Swansea website about his love for his former club and the decision saying, "It's my local club, a club I love, so I hope it will be enough." In 2022, he stated that he was still struggling with chronic pain after retirement, claiming that his 'ankle is that of a 90-year-old' despite undergoing several surgeries.

Michu's older brother Hernán was also a footballer. A midfielder, he too was developed at Oviedo before playing for local sides and subsequently switching to a managerial role; both worked together at Langreo in 2015–16.

== Career statistics ==
=== Club ===
Appearances and goals by club, season and competition
Club	Season	League			National cup (Note: Includes Copa del Rey, FA Cup)		League cup (Note: Includes Football League Cup)		Europe		Other		Total	
Club	Season	Division	Apps	Goals	Apps	Goals	Apps	Goals	Apps	Goals	Apps	Goals	Apps	Goals
Oviedo	2003–04	Tercera División	12	3	0	0	—		—		—		12	3
Oviedo	2004–05	Tercera División	21	4	0	0	—		—		7 (Note: Six appearances and one goal in Copa Federación de España, one appearance and one goal in Tercera División play-offs)	2	28	6
Oviedo	2005–06	Segunda División B	31	3	3	0	—		—		—		34	3
Oviedo	2006–07	Segunda División B	31	3	0	0	—		—		2 (Note: Appearances in Copa Federación de España)	1	33	4
Oviedo	Total		95	13	3	0	—		—		9	3	107	16
Celta B	2007–08	Segunda División B	28	10	0	0	—		—		—		28	10
Celta	2007–08	Segunda División	14	1	0	0	—		—		—		14	1
Celta	2008–09	Segunda División	26	1	2	0	—		—		—		28	1
Celta	2009–10	Segunda División	30	6	6	2	—		—		—		36	8
Celta	2010–11	Segunda División	31	6	1	0	—		—		2 (Note: Appearances in La Liga play-offs)	1	34	7
Celta	Total		101	14	9	2	—		—		2	1	112	17
Rayo Vallecano	2011–12	La Liga	37	15	2	2	—		—		—		39	17
Swansea City	2012–13	Premier League	35	18	2	1	6	3	—		—		43	22
Swansea City	2013–14	Premier League	17	2	0	0	0	0	7 (Note: Appearances in UEFA Europa League)	4	—		24	6
Swansea City	Total		52	20	2	1	6	3	7	4	—		67	28
Napoli (loan)	2014–15	Serie A	3	0	0	0	—		3 (Note: One appearance in UEFA Champions League, two appearances in UEFA Europa League)	0	—		6	0
Langreo	2015–16	Tercera División	13	10	0	0	—		—		4 (Note: Appearances in Tercera División play-offs)	2	17	12
Oviedo	2016–17	Segunda División	27	1	1	2	—		—		—		28	3
Career total			356	83	17	7	6	3	10	4	15	6	404	103

=== International ===
Appearances and goals by national team and year
National team	Year	Apps	Goals
Spain	2013	1	0
Total		1	0

== Managerial statistics ==
As of 1 November 2024

Managerial record by team and tenure
Team	Nat	From	To	Record								Ref
Team	Nat	From	To	G	W	D	L	GF	GA	GD	Win %	Ref
Burgos (caretaker)	(Spain)	29 October 2024	31 October 2024	1	1	0	0	5	2	+3	100.00	
Total				1	1	0	0	5	2	+3	100.00	—

== Honours ==
Swansea City

- Football League Cup: 2012–13

Individual

- Swansea City Player of the Year: 2012–13
