= Adam Murray =

English footballer (born 1981)

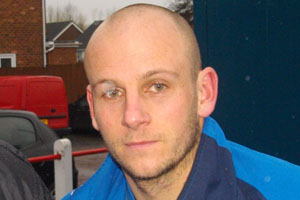
- Murray in 2011

Personal information
- Full name: Adam David Murray
- Date of birth: 30 September 1981 (age 45)
- Place of birth: Birmingham, England
- Height: 5 ft 9 in (1.75 m)
- Position: Midfielder

Team information
- Current team: Barrow (manager)

Youth career
- 1993–1998: Derby County

Senior career*
Years	Team	Apps	(Gls)
1998–2003	Derby County	54	(0)
2002	→ Mansfield Town (loan)	13	(7)
2003	→ Kidderminster Harriers (loan)	3	(0)
2003	Notts County	1	(0)
2003	Burton Albion	2	(0)
2003–2004	Notts County	2	(0)
2004	Kidderminster Harriers	19	(3)
2004–2005	Mansfield Town	32	(5)
2005–2006	Carlisle United	47	(2)
2006–2007	Torquay United	21	(0)
2007–2008	Macclesfield Town	34	(0)
2008–2010	Oxford United	88	(11)
2010	Luton Town	7	(0)
2010–2011	→ Mansfield Town (loan)	12	(1)
2011–2015	Mansfield Town	127	(10)
2013	→ Rainworth Miners Welfare (loan)		
2013	→ Worksop Town (loan)	4	(0)
2018	Sutton Coldfield		
Total		466	(39)

International career
2002	England U20	1	(0)

Managerial career
- 2014–2016: Mansfield Town
- 2016–2017: Boston United
- 2019: Barnsley (caretaker)
- 2020: Barnsley (caretaker)
- 2022–2023: AFC Fylde
- 2024–2025: Eastbourne Borough
- 2025–2026: Kidderminster Harriers
- 2026–: Barrow
- * Club domestic league appearances and goals

Adam David Murray (born 30 September 1981) is an English football manager and former professional footballer who manages National League club Barrow. A creative midfielder, he made over 500 appearances in a 17-year playing career in the Premier League, Football League and Football Conference.

An England under-20 international, Murray turned professional at Derby County, making his Premier League debut in April 1999. He played 62 games in six seasons at Derby, including 32 Premier League matches, but struggled with alcoholism and spent four weeks in recovery at the Priory Hospital. He spent time on loan at Mansfield Town (winning promotion out of the Third Division in 2001–02) and Kidderminster Harriers, before leaving Derby in November 2003. He had brief non-contract spells at Notts County and Burton Albion before seeing out the 2003–04 season with Kidderminster Harriers. He signed with Mansfield Town in June 2004, moving on to Carlisle United in March 2005. He helped Carlisle to win promotion back into the Football League through the Conference National play-offs in 2005 and then to win the League Two title in 2005–06, whilst also reaching the 2006 Football League Trophy final. He joined Torquay United for a £10,000 fee in August 2006 and was sold to Macclesfield Town for £17,500 in January 2007. He returned to the Conference Premier upon joining Oxford United in January 2008.

He spent two and a half seasons at Oxford and was club captain for many of his 97 appearances. However, he missed the second half of the 2009–10 campaign and the subsequent 2010 play-off final victory due to injury. He remained in the Conference Premier, signing with Luton Town in July 2010. Three months later, he was loaned out to Mansfield Town through a deal made permanent in January 2011. He would spend four and a half seasons with Mansfield, taking his final tally with the club over his four different spells to 211 games and 24 goals. He featured on the losing side in the 2011 FA Trophy final and was named as the club's Player of the Season as Mansfield won promotion into the Football League as champions of the Conference Premier in 2012–13. He had short loan spells at Rainworth Miners Welfare and Worksop Town after falling out of favour in 2013. He retired from playing at the end of the 2014–15 season, though he briefly came out of retirement to play for Sutton Coldfield in 2018.

He was appointed as Mansfield Town's assistant manager whilst still a player and became caretaker manager in November 2014. He got the job permanently the following month, aged 33, and kept the club in League Two with a 21st-place finish. A 12th-place finish followed in the 2015–16 season before he quit the club in November 2016. He was appointed Boston United manager the next month, taking the club to a 15th-place finish in the National League North at the end of the 2016–17 season. He resigned in October 2017 and was named assistant manager at Guiseley the following month. He left Guiseley in February 2018 and went on to coach at Burton Albion, Barnsley, West Bromwich Albion, Port Vale and Beşiktaş. He served Barnsley as caretaker manager in October 2019 and October 2020. He took charge at AFC Fylde in November 2022 and led the club to the National League North title at the end of the 2022–23 season before being sacked in October 2023. He joined Cheltenham Town as assistant manager in October 2023 and was appointed manager at Eastbourne Borough in January 2024. He spent 18 months at the club before switching to Kidderminster Harriers. He led Harriers to promotion out of the National League North via the play-offs in May 2026 and then moved on to manage Barrow.

== Playing career ==
=== Derby County ===
Born in Birmingham, West Midlands, Murray began his career as a trainee with Derby County at the age of 11. He turned professional in August 1998. He made his Premier League debut on 17 April 1999, coming on as a second-half substitute for Mikkel Beck in Derby's 5–1 defeat away to West Ham United. He made a further three substitute appearances in what remained of the 1998–99 season. Manager Jim Smith would hand him his first start on 6 May 2000, in a 0–0 draw with Newcastle United at Pride Park. This was his only start from eight appearances in the 1999–2000 campaign. He featured 18 times throughout the 2000–01 season. Derby were relegated from the Premier League at the end of the 2001–02 season, and Murray featured irregularly under both Smith and Colin Todd.

On 25 February 2002, Murray joined Third Division club Mansfield Town on loan. He scored his first goal in professional football in his second appearance for the "Stags", a 2–1 win over Scunthorpe United at Field Mill on 2 March. He went on to score seven goals in 13 games for Mansfield, leading manager Stuart Watkiss to say that "his goals have been invaluable to us" as Mansfield secured promotion with a third-place finish. Back with Derby in the First Division for the 2002–03 season, Murray gradually established himself in John Gregory's first-team. He received the first sending off of his career on 12 October, getting shown the red card for a reckless challenge late into a 0–0 draw at Bradford City. He featured a total of 24 times that season, bringing his final tally at Derby to 62 appearances.

=== Transition period ===
His career stalled whilst he struggled with alcohol addiction problems whilst only 21-years old. Murray was able to gain treatment at the Priory Hospital in 2003. He made a swift return to football after four weeks of treatment. He started the 2003–04 season on loan at Kidderminster Harriers in the Third Division. However, he was released from Derby County in November 2003 after having already been transfer-listed in the summer by new Derby manager George Burley. Murray joined Notts County in 2003 after leaving Derby County, during this transition period he played twice in a one-week non-contract spell with Conference club Burton Albion, before returning to Notts County. In January 2004, Murray rejoined Kidderminster Harriers and was a regular in their side until the end of the season. He was released by Kidderminster because of what director of football Jan Mølby said were "financial reasons".

=== Mansfield Town ===
In June 2004, he joined Mansfield Town following "lengthy talks with Stags boss Keith Curle". However, Curle departed in November, and Murray later admitted that he "didn't really get on with [Curle's successor] Carlton Palmer at all". He scored five goals in 37 games.

=== Carlisle United ===
Murray moved on to Brunton Park in March 2005 after Carlisle United manager Paul Simpson succeeded in his fourth attempt to sign him. He played ten games in what remained of the 2004–05 season, helping United to qualify for the Conference National play-offs in third-place. He was an unused substitute in the play-off final as Carlisle returned to the Football League with a 1–0 victory over Stevenage Borough at the Britannia Stadium. Murray scored three goals in 42 appearances during the 2005–06 season, including the equalising goal in the 2006 Football League Trophy final against Swansea City at the Millennium Stadium. However, his side went on to lose 2–1. Carlisle won promotion as champions of League Two. On 10 August 2006, Murray handed in a transfer request to new manager Neil McDonald, after he failed to appear in Carlisle's opening two League One games of the 2006–07 season.

=== Torquay United ===
On 31 August 2006, summer transfer deadline day, Murray joined Torquay United for a fee of £10,000; manager Ian Atkins said that "I must admit I'm surprised that the chairman (Mike Bateson) has stuck his neck out financially... but Adam will make a big difference to us". He was a key player for Atkins and his successor Luboš Kubík, and played 25 games in the first half of the 2006–07 season, but opted to leave Plainmoor after what new club chairman Chris Roberts described as "quite severe family problems to deal with nearer his home in the Midlands".

=== Macclesfield Town ===
On 10 January 2007, Murray joined fellow League Two side Macclesfield Town, after being signed by manager Paul Ince for a fee of £17,500 on a two-and-a-half-year contract. He made eight starts and three substitute appearances in the second half of the 2006–07 season. He played 25 matches under the stewardship of Ian Brightwell in the first half of the 2007–08 season.

=== Oxford United ===
Murray joined Oxford United on 4 January 2008. He signed a new two-year contract in May after being a consistent first-team player at the Kassam Stadium as Oxford ended the 2007–08 season with nine wins in eleven games. He was named as captain in July after manager Darren Patterson said that "he looks incredibly lean and has obviously looked after himself well during the close season". He scored seven goals in 51 appearances across the 2008–09 campaign, and was an ever-present in the league as the "U's" posted a seventh-place finish as they missed out on the play-offs after being deducted five points.

Following an operation on his back, Murray missed the second half of Oxford's 2009–10 campaign, in which they were promoted into the Football League via the play-offs. He was released from the club at the end of the season after his family failed to settle into the Oxford area and subsequently returned to Derby. Chairman Kelvin Thomas told the club's official website: "Unfortunately Adam wasn't involved in the final promotion push due to injury, but we do feel that our decision to have players live close has been justified. Adam has made a decision to put his family first, which as a family orientated club we fully understand and appreciate." Speaking in November 2015, Murray said that he had resented manager Chris Wilder for releasing him, but now saw him as one of the best managers in English football and that "when I look back now I respect that decision because I would have done the same thing".

=== Luton Town ===
On 7 July 2010, Murray joined Conference Premier side Luton Town on a two-year contract. He made only seven appearances for Richard Money's side and departed Kenilworth Road early in the 2010–11 season.

=== Return to Mansfield ===
Murray rejoined Mansfield Town, only 20 miles (32 km) from his home in Derby, on a three-month loan deal on 1 October 2010, with a view to a permanent move taking place in January. On 5 January 2011, Murray made his transfer permanent despite manager David Holdsworth having been replaced by Duncan Russell. He ended the 2010–11 campaign with seven goals in 41 games for Mansfield, who went on to reach the final of the FA Trophy at Wembley Stadium. Murray was substituted 18 minutes into extra-time of the final, with the only goal of the game being scored by Darlington with just one minute left to play. He was appointed club captain in August 2011 and signed a new contract three months later. Mansfield won 13 of their last 15 matches of the 2011–12 season to qualify for the play-offs. They went on to lose to York City in the play-off semi-finals despite Murray and Gary Roberts dominating much of the midfield play.

In June 2012, Murray became assistant manager at Mansfield following Micky Moore's decision to leave. He signed a new one-year deal in November 2012, combining first-team duties with coaching the youth team. This came a month after he criticised sections of the supporters for dishing out "personal" abuse following a four-match run without a win. At the end of the 2012–13 title-winning season, The Non-League Paper described how "Muzza the magician grabbed games by the scruff of the neck whether playing in an advanced or deeper role". Promotion was confirmed with a 1–0 victory over Wrexham on 20 April, after which Murray stated that "this is the best without doubt. It's the best thing I've ever done".

Murray fell out with manager Paul Cox early in the 2013–14 season. He was loaned out to Rainworth Miners Welfare of the Northern Premier League Division One South. He had an eventful spell at Rainworth, with manager Kevin Gee resigning after Murray was red-carded in a 3–1 home defeat to Brigg Town on 10 September. On 8 November, he joined Northern Premier League Premier Division side Worksop Town on a two-month loan. His loan spell was cut short and he returned to Mansfield on 3 December after making peace with Cox. Upon becoming player-manager at Mansfield, he announced that he would step back from playing to concentrate on management.

On 21 March 2018, he came out of retirement and signed a short-term contract with Sutton Coldfield Town. Town finished the 2017–18 season bottom of the Northern Premier League Premier Division.

== Style of play ==
Described in the Worcester News as a creative midfielder with energy and tenacity in September 2003, Murray earned an England U20 cap the previous year. His vision and range of passing was acknowledged to be largely unparalleled in non-League football.

== Coaching career ==
=== Mansfield Town ===
Murray became caretaker manager of Mansfield Town after Paul Cox left the club 19th in the League Two table on 21 November 2014. He rejected advice to take an older mentor as his assistant and instead retained existing coaches Richard Cooper and Micky Moore, who he said were "as hungry as I am for coaching". Murray's first game as manager, a day later at Field Mill, was a 1–0 victory over Plymouth Argyle. After a spell as caretaker manager, Murray was given the job on a permanent basis on 5 December, becoming the youngest manager in the top four divisions of English football. He made four free transfer signings in the January transfer window: defenders Junior Brown, Michael Raynes and Matty Blair, and midfielder Ricky Ravenhill. He sold Rob Taylor to Tranmere Rovers after the versatile player sought a move closer to his home. He also made use of the loan market, bringing in Billy Kee, Callum Elder, Lenny Pidgeley, Jeffrey Monakana, Adam Smith and Terry Hawkridge. Murray signed a new two-year contract in May. Mansfield ended the 2014–15 season in 21st place, seven points above relegated Cheltenham Town, and Murray released seven players in the summer, saying that "I feel the whole club needs a fresh start". Ollie Palmer was also sold to Leyton Orient.

The club underwent a rebuild of the squad for the 2015–16 season, with 15 new players arriving at the club. These free transfer signings included: goalkeepers Brian Jensen and Scott Shearer; defenders Mal Benning, Lee Collins, Nicky Hunt and Krystian Pearce; midfielders Adam Chapman and Mitch Rose; and forwards Chris Beardsley, Matt Green, Nathan Thomas, Craig Westcarr and Adi Yussuf. A positive start saw the team win six and draw four of their opening 12 games to sit fourth in the table in October. However, their promotion challenge fell away and Mansfield ended the season mid-table in 12th place. Murray released three players in the summer.

Murray strengthened the team for the 2016–17 season, paying an undisclosed fee for Bury striker Danny Rose. He also made free transfer signings of defenders Rhys Bennett and George Taft; midfielder Kevan Hurst; and forwards CJ Hamilton, Ashley Hemmings, Patrick Hoban and Darius Henderson. Kyle Howkins and Alex Iacovitti also came in on loan. He was nominated for the EFL League Two Manager of the Month award after his team picked up ten points from their opening five fixtures in August. Mansfield fell away after this good start however, and Murray was booed by supporters, though denied reports that he was considering quitting the club on 3 November, stating "I'm not going anywhere for a long while." Murray resigned 11 days later after a 4–0 defeat at Portsmouth left Mansfield 18th in the table.

=== Boston United ===
On 9 December 2016, Murray was appointed as manager of Boston United, who were 15th in the National League North table. Murray said that "the possibility of it being more of a project than a job, that's what pulled me to it". Boston went on to finish the 2016–17 season in 15th place. Murray released four players in the summer. In April 2017 he told the media that he was planning to move the club's training base. He said that there was an "unbelievable" number of players eager to join the club, with summer signings including goalkeeper George Willis; defenders Bradley Beatson, James Clifton, Jack Cowgill, Taron Hare and Jordan Keane; midfielder Jamie McGuire; and forwards Ashley Hemmings, Pearson Mwanyongo, Kabongo Tshimanga and Tyrell Waite. He compared his team to a baby deer after a difficult start to the new season, stating that "they're a little bit wobbly when they're born", whilst also saying that "[recruitment has] not been good enough and we take ultimate responsibility for that". On 28 October 2017, Murray left his position as manager of Boston United after a run of one win in 11 games left the club in the bottom two. Upon departing York Street, he said that "they need a shot of confidence and a centre forward, everything else is in place"; the "Pilgrims" went on to finish the 2017–18 season in ninth place. He later admitted it had been a mistake to take the Boston job.

=== Coaching spells ===
On 10 November 2017, Murray was appointed as assistant manager to Paul Cox at National League side Guiseley. He left the club when Cox was dismissed on 14 February 2018. He went on to work as Lead Youth Development Phase coach at Burton Albion. Later in 2018 he was appointed as the Barnsley U18 manager and stepped up to assist the first-team the following year. He became caretaker manager after Daniel Stendel was sacked on 8 October 2019. He took charge of five games – three draws and two defeats – until Gerhard Struber was appointed manager on 20 November. On 6 October 2020, Struber left Oakwell and Murray stepped in again to serve as caretaker manager. Valérien Ismaël was named as the club's new manager 17 days later. Murray followed Ismaël to West Bromwich Albion in July 2021, and left The Hawthorns following Ismaël's sacking seven months later. He joined the backroom staff at Port Vale in February 2022 in order to support acting manager Andy Crosby during manager Darrell Clarke's extended period of bereavement leave. He moved to Turkey the following month to assist Ismaël at Süper Lig champions Beşiktaş. He left the club after three months when Ismaël was sacked.

=== AFC Fylde ===
On 14 November 2022, Murray was appointed manager of National League North club AFC Fylde on a contract until June 2025. He oversaw an upturn in form that led to him being awarded the league's Manager of the Month award for January 2023 having won four out of his six games in an unbeaten month. Fylde went on to secure promotion into the National League as champions of the National League North at the end of the 2022–23 season, describing it as "another small step on my journey". He was sacked on 8 October 2023, with Fylde bottom of the National League.

=== Cheltenham Town ===
On 20 October 2023, Murray joined League One club Cheltenham Town as assistant to newly-appointed manager Darrell Clarke.

=== Eastbourne Borough ===
On 4 January 2024, Murray accepted an offer to join Eastbourne Borough as manager, with the club sitting in 21st in the National League South table following the sacking of previous manager Mark Beard. Borough finished the 2023–24 season two places and six points above the relegation zone. He left the club at the end of the 2024–25 season to spend more time with his family in Derby after having led the club to a third-place finish, one point short of the league title.

=== Kidderminster Harriers ===
On 20 May 2025, Murray was appointed as manager of National League North club Kidderminster Harriers. He led the club to a play-off spot with a third-place finish at the end of the 2025–26 season, which he said was a proud accomplishment for his players. He was twice named as National League North Manager of the Month after winning all his games in December 2025 and April 2026. On 9 May, Kidderminster defeated South Shields by two goals to nil in the play-off final and thereby gained promotion to the National League, with Murray saying he was proud of his player after an "absolute grind" of a season. He also commented that "vicious" online abuse and terrace taunts had hurt him, and that his faith in God and himself had kept him strong. He left the club on 12 May 2026 following an approach from another club.

=== Barrow ===
On 12 May 2026, Murray was appointed manager of Barrow, taking charge of the club following their relegation into the National League. Barrow struggled in August, though they quickly improved and Murray was nominated for the National League Manager of the Month award for September and October, with only a stoppage time equaliser preventing a perfect league record in October.

== Management style ==
Murray describes himself as a manager with an eye for detail to get the most from the resources available by working on 'marginal gains' to get the extra one per cent advantage to improve his player's and teams' performances. At Mansfield, Murray developed a passing game adopted from the Dutch total football model but tailored to lower league players. Murray is known to be an advocate of sports science, sports analysis, strength and conditioning, and sports psychology within football to achieve maximum gains on the field. Murray has often spoken about the importance of building the right infrastructure for his teams including the importance of a strong academy system for young players to develop into the first-team environment. His success with developing young talent includes such players as Ryan Tafazolli, who cites Murray as the biggest influence on his career as a young player and credits him with "developing him from a boy to a man".

== Personal life ==
Murray's wife, Lyndsey, gave birth to his fourth child in October 2015. Former Derby County youth team teammate Karl Hawley was the best man at his wedding. Murray spent time at the Priory Clinic to combat his alcoholism during his playing career, and also gained a strong Christian faith after being introduced to church by teammate Lee Williamson in 2009.

== Career statistics ==
=== Playing statistics ===
Appearances and goals by club, season and competition
Club	Season	League			FA Cup		League Cup		Other		Total	
Club	Season	Division	Apps	Goals	Apps	Goals	Apps	Goals	Apps	Goals	Apps	Goals
Derby County	1998–99	Premier League	4	0	0	0	0	0	—		4	0
Derby County	1999–2000	Premier League	8	0	0	0	0	0	—		8	0
Derby County	2000–01	Premier League	14	0	3	0	1	0	—		18	0
Derby County	2001–02	Premier League	6	0	0	0	2	0	—		8	0
Derby County	2002–03	First Division	22	0	1	0	1	0	—		24	0
Derby County	2003–04	First Division	0	0	0	0	0	0	—		0	0
Derby County	Total		54	0	4	0	4	0	0	0	62	0
Mansfield Town (loan)	2001–02	Third Division	13	7	—		—		—		13	7
Notts County	2003–04	Second Division	3	0	1	0	0	0	0	0	4	0
Burton Albion	2003–04	Conference National	2	0	0	0	—		0	0	2	0
Kidderminster Harriers	2003–04	Third Division	22	3	0	0	0	0	0	0	22	3
Mansfield Town	2004–05	League Two	32	5	2	0	1	0	2 (Note: Appearance(s) in Football League Trophy)	0	37	5
Carlisle United	2004–05	Conference National	10	1	—		—		—		10	1
Carlisle United	2005–06	League Two	37	1	0	0	1	1	4	1	42	3
Carlisle United	Total		47	2	0	0	1	1	4	1	52	4
Torquay United	2006–07	League Two	21	0	3	0	0	0	1	0	25	0
Macclesfield Town	2006–07	League Two	11	0	—		—		—		11	0
Macclesfield Town	2007–08	League Two	23	0	1	0	1	0	0	0	25	0
Macclesfield Town	Total		34	0	1	0	1	0	0	0	36	0
Oxford United	2007–08	Conference Premier	21	3	0	0	—		0	0	21	3
Oxford United	2008–09	Conference Premier	46	7	4	0	—		1 (Note: Appearance(s) in FA Trophy)	0	51	7
Oxford United	2009–10	Conference Premier	21	1	3	0	—		1	0	25	1
Oxford United	Total		88	11	7	0	0	0	2	0	97	11
Luton Town	2010–11	Conference Premier	7	0	0	0	—		0	0	7	0
Mansfield Town	2010–11	Conference Premier	32	6	2	0	—		7	1	41	7
Mansfield Town	2011–12	Conference Premier	39	0	2	0	—		3 (Note: 1 appearances in FA Trophy and 2 appearances in play-offs)	0	44	0
Mansfield Town	2012–13	Conference Premier	36	3	2	0	—		1	0	39	3
Mansfield Town	2013–14	League Two	18	1	2	0	1	0	0	0	21	1
Mansfield Town	2014–15	League Two	14	1	1	0	0	0	1	0	16	1
Mansfield Town	Total		139	11	9	0	1	0	12	1	161	12
Worksop Town (loan)	2013–14	Northern Premier League; Premier Division	4	0	0	0	—		0	0	4	0
Career total			466	39	27	0	8	1	21	2	522	42

=== Managerial statistics ===
As of match played 21 November 2026

Managerial record by team and tenure
Team	From	To	Record					Ref
Team	From	To	P	W	D	L	Win %	Ref
Mansfield Town	21 November 2014	16 November 2016	103	32	27	44	31.1	
Boston United	8 December 2016	16 November 2017	42	11	10	21	26.2	
Barnsley (caretaker)	8 October 2019	20 November 2019	5	0	3	2	0.0	
Barnsley (caretaker)	6 October 2020	23 October 2020	3	0	3	0	0.0	
AFC Fylde	14 November 2022	8 October 2023	49	24	9	16	49.0	
Eastbourne Borough	4 January 2024	16 May 2025	66	33	18	15	50.0	
Kidderminster Harriers	20 May 2025	12 May 2026	53	28	15	10	52.8	
Barrow	12 May 2026	Present	20	10	5	5	50.0	
Total			341	138	90	113	40.5	—

== Honours ==
=== As a player ===
Mansfield Town

- Football League Third Division third-place promotion: 2001–02
- Conference Premier: 2012–13
- FA Trophy runner-up: 2010–11

Carlisle United

- Football League Two: 2005–06
- Conference National play-offs: 2005
- Football League Trophy runner-up: 2005–06

Individual

- Mansfield Town Player of the Season: 2012–13

=== As a manager ===
AFC Fylde

- National League North: 2022–23

Kidderminster Harriers

- National League North play-offs: 2026

Individual

- National League North Manager of the Month: January 2023, December 2025, April 2026
