= Zigor (disambiguation) =

Kepa Akixo, aka Zigor, is a Spanish artist.

Zigor may also refer to:

- Zigor (opera)
- Zigor Goikuria (1979), known simply as Zigor
- Zigor Aranalde (1973)
