= 2006 Football League Trophy final =

2006 Football League Trophy Final
- Event: 2005–06 Football League Trophy
Carlisle United	Swansea City
1	2
- Date: 2 April 2006
- Venue: Millennium Stadium, Cardiff
- Referee: Tony Leake (Lancashire)
- Attendance: 42,028

The 2006 Football League Trophy Final was an association football match played on 2 April 2006 at the Millennium Stadium, Cardiff. The match was the 23rd final of the Football League Trophy, the domestic cup competition for teams from Football Leagues One and Two. The final was contested between Swansea City of League One and Carlisle United of League Two. Swansea were appearing in their second Football League Trophy final, having won the 1994 competition, while Carlisle were appearing in their fourth final, having lost in the 1995 and 2003 finals and won the 1997 final.

Both sides had progressed through five rounds to reach the final based on their location, Carlisle in the northern section of the draw and Swansea in the southern section. Carlisle required extra-time on three occasions during their run to the final, including a 22-man penalty shoot-out victory over Tranmere Rovers in the northern area quarter-finals. Karl Hawley was their top goalscorer in the tournament, scoring four times en route to the final. Swansea twice required extra-time to progress in their matches, while Andy Robinson led the team with five goals in the competition.

The final was watched by 42,028 spectators and was refereed by Tony Burke. Swansea took the lead inside the opening five minutes when Lee Trundle deflected a clearance by Carlisle goalkeeper Kieran Westwood. Leon Britton collected the ball before crossing to Trundle who proceeded to control the ball with his chest before volleying into the net. Hawley had a goal disallowed shortly before half-time but Carlisle were able to equalise when Adam Murray scored via a header. Swansea took the lead with nine minutes remaining through Adebayo Akinfenwa and held on to win the match 2–1.

During their post-match celebrations, Swansea players Trundle and Alan Tate were pictured with a t-shirt and flag bearing offensive material referring to South Wales rivals Cardiff City. The pair were given a police caution over the incident and received a ban and fine from the Football Association of Wales.

== Route to the final ==
The Football League Trophy is a domestic association football competition for teams competing in the third and fourth tiers of English football, Leagues One and Two of the Football League. Some teams from the fifth tier, the Football Conference, were also invited to compete in order to ensure an even number of competitors. The teams are grouped together based on their location, split between north and south sections, with the winners of each area meeting in the competition final.

=== Carlisle United ===
Round	Opposition	Score
1st	Oldham Athletic (A)	1–1 (6–5 after penalties)
2nd	Blackpool (H)	2–1
QF	Tranmere Rovers (A)	0–0 (11–10 after penalties)
SF	Kidderminster Harriers (H)	1–0
F	Macclesfield Town (H); Macclesfield Town (A)	2–1; 3–2 (aet)

League Two club Carlisle United entered the competition in the first round in the northern section of the draw where they met Oldham Athletic. Carlisle took an early lead as Karl Hawley opened the scoring after five minutes. They held the lead for more than 70 minutes until Andy Liddell converted a penalty to equalise for Oldham. The match proceeded to extra-time before requiring a penalty shoot-out with the score remaining 1–1. The first 11 penalties were all successfully converted until Oldham's Mark Hughes failed to score, handing Carlisle victory. In the second round, Carlisle defeated Blackpool 2–1, with all three goals being scored in a five-minute period. Gary Harkins gave Blackpool the lead after 62 minutes only for Carlisle to equalise one minute later through Hawley. Four minutes later, Carlisle took the lead through Derek Holmes and held on to secure victory.

In the area quarter-final, Carlisle again required a penalty shoot-out to advance. Drawn against Tranmere Rovers, the two sides played 90 minutes and extra-time without scoring. In the ensuing shoot-out, 21 consecutive penalties were scored, with all 22 players on the field at the time taking a spot kick. The shoot-out eventually ended when Tranmere goalkeeper Steve Wilson missed his penalty to hand Carlisle the win. The side progressed to the area final by defeating Kidderminster Harriers through a single goal by Glenn Murray.

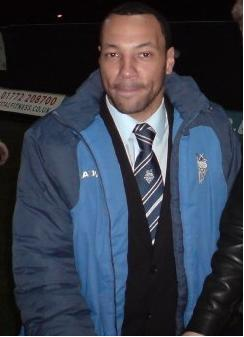
Karl Hawley scored four times during Carlisle's cup run

Carlisle met Macclesfield Town in the area final and fell behind in the first leg when Andrew Smart gave Macclesfield the lead with his first goal in professional football. Hawley equalised for Carlisle soon afterwards, scoring his third goal of the competition. In the final minute, Carlisle defender Peter Murphy gave his side the home victory after converting from a corner kick. Carlisle's advantage lasted only four minutes of the second leg as Andrew Teague tied the score 2–2 on aggregate. Midway through the first half, Matty McNeil gave Macclesfield the lead before Hawley tied the game for Carlisle shortly before half-time. The second half remained goalless, requiring extra-time for the third match of Carlisle's competition. After 109 minutes, Simon Grand gave Carlisle the lead. With the away goals rule in effect, Macclesfield required two goals to advance. Kevin Townson pulled a goal back in the final minute of the game but Carlisle ultimately advanced on the away goals rule as the tie ended 4–4 on aggregate.

=== Swansea City ===
Round	Opposition	Score
1st	Torquay United (A)	1–3
2nd	Rushden & Diamonds (H)	4–0
QF	Peterborough United (H)	3–1
SF	Walsall (H)	2–2 (6–5 after penalties)
F	Colchester United (H); Colchester United (A)	1–0; 1–2

League One side Swansea City also entered the competition in the first round, although in the southern section of the draw. They fell behind early in their first match against Torquay United but equalised midway through the second half after a goal from Adrian Forbes. In the 86th minute, Adebayo Akinfenwa gave Swansea the lead with a headed goal before Andy Robinson secured victory with his side's third goal two minutes later. In the second round, Swansea recorded a 4–0 victory over Rushden & Diamonds. Robinson opened the scoring after 20 minutes and added a second midway through the second half. Swansea added further goals from Garry Monk, his first for the club, and Paul Connor late in the game.

In the area quarter-final, Swansea were drawn at home against Peterborough United. The two sides played out a goalless draw over 90 minutes, necessitating extra-time. Peterborough took a quick lead through Danny Crow but Swansea equalised one minute later via Akinfenwa. Robinson gave Swansea the lead in the 99th minute before Akinfenwa added his second goal ten minutes later to secure a 3–1 victory. Swansea met Walsall in the semi-final, taking an early lead through Leon Knight. He had a second goal disallowed before Walsall eventually equalised through an Alex Nicholls goal in the second half. Robinson gave Swansea the lead in the 83rd minute but his goal was quickly cancelled out by an equaliser from James Constable which sent the match to extra-time. The match eventually required a penalty shoot-out. The opening eight penalties were all successfully converted before the following four were all missed. The shootout ended when Walsall's Graham Deakin missed his side's eighth penalty, allowing Alan Tate to convert the winning penalty for Swansea.

Swansea met Colchester United in the southern area final, winning the first leg at the Liberty Stadium 1–0. The only goal of the game was scored shortly before half time by Akinfenwa, his fourth of the competition, who received the ball on the edge of the penalty area before shooting low into the net. The first half of the second leg remained goalless but Colchester opened the scoring early in the second half through Neil Danns, whose shot deflected off a divot in the turf and eluded Swansea goalkeeper Willy Guéret. The strike ended a goal drought that the club had been enduring, the first time a Colchester player had scored for more than 12 hours of play. However, Colchester were tied on aggregate for only five minutes, as Swansea retook the lead when Leon Britton scored. Swansea secured victory when Knight added a second on the day to give his side a 3–1 aggregate victory.

== Background ==
Carlisle entered the final having won seven of their previous eight fixtures and were unbeaten in their last nine league games. The club was in their first season back in League Two after winning promotion from the Football Conference the previous year in the play-off final. The 2006 final was the fourth time in the club's history that they had reached the final of the Football League Trophy, having suffered defeats in the 1995 and 2003 finals and been victorious in the 1997 final.

One month prior to the game, Hawley was named League Two Player of the Year for the season. He was also the highest scoring player in League Two, having scored 25 goals in all competitions at the time of the final. Hawley attributed his success during the campaign to being spurred on by his omission from the starting lineup of the Conference play-off final one year previously, stating "it forced me to work harder at my game and I've become a better player for it."

Swansea were featuring in their second Football League Trophy final, having won the competition in 1994. They entered the final having lost their previous league fixture, 1–0 against Gillingham, but having not lost any of their previous ten fixtures beforehand. Four days prior the final, Swansea had won the FAW Premier Cup for the second consecutive season after defeating Wrexham 2–1.

Like Hawley, Swansea's Lee Trundle had won his league's respective player award, being named the League One Player of the Year. Trundle was also his side's leading goalscorer for the season, netting 21 times during the campaign. Robinson was Swansea's second highest goalscorer with 18, including 5 in the club's Football League Trophy run.

=== Pre-match ===
Carlisle were hampered by the absence of on-loan striker Michael Bridges who was forced to miss the match having already appeared in the competition earlier in the season for parent club Bristol City. Swansea had two players, Rory Fallon and Tom Williams, cup-tied for the fixture while Robinson missed training the day before the game with a dead leg, but was expected to be fit to play.

The week before the final, the main sponsor of the competition LDV Vans pulled its sponsorship after being sold to a new owner. The company had entered administration the previous year, but the new owners had decided not to honour the prize fund agreement. This meant that the winners of the match would receive no prize money, rather than the £50,000 that had been on offer when the competition began. Swansea chairman Huw Jenkins estimated that, if they won the trophy, the loss of a sponsor and the contractual win bonuses for the players would result in a loss of around £75,000 for his club. The two clubs would however receive 45 per cent of the gate receipts for the final.

The match was played at the Millennium Stadium in Cardiff, which was hosting its last Football League Trophy final. The venue had hosted the finals of English football's main cup competitions and play-off finals since 2001, during the construction of the new Wembley Stadium. South Wales Police expressed concerns over possible violence ahead of the game as the match was played in Cardiff, the home city of Swansea's South Wales rivals Cardiff City. Swansea were allocated 33,000 tickets for the match, with a further 7,000 available on request if necessary. However, the club eventually sold 28,000 of their allocation for the match. Carlisle sold only 13,000 of their allocation.

== Match ==
=== Summary ===
The match kicked off at 1:30pm BST in front of 42,028 spectators and was refereed by Tony Leake. Swansea pressed straight away and were rewarded with the opening goal after only three minutes. The ball was played to Carlisle goalkeeper Kieran Westwood who attempted to kick the ball upfield, but his clearance hit Trundle and rolled across the Carlisle defence. Robinson won the ball back from an opposition defender before Britton played a long ball into the area. Controlling the ball with his chest, Trundle proceeded to volley the ball across the face of goal and into the net with his left foot.

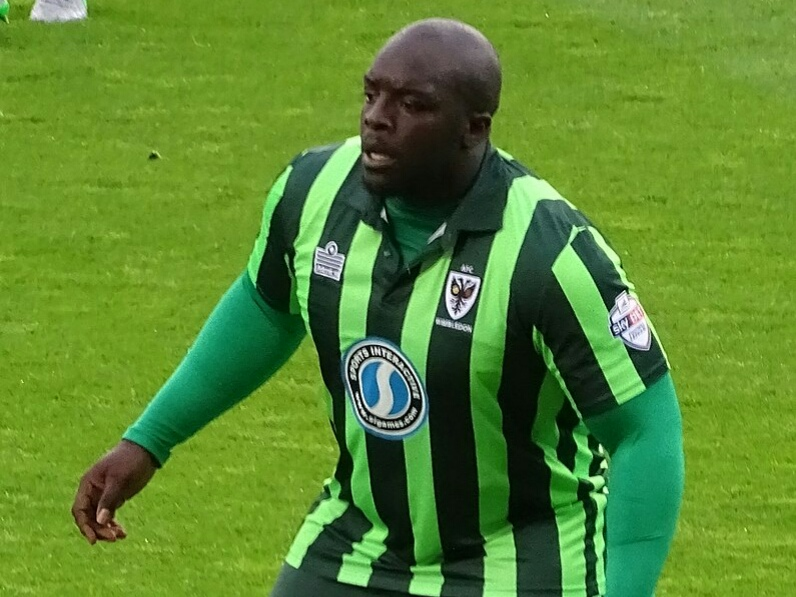
Adebayo Akinfenwa scored the winning goal for Swansea.

The goal provided further encouragement for Swansea, who continued to pressure Carlisle for the opening 30 minutes. Robinson had an attempt off target after being played through by Trundle while Akinfenwa drew a save from Westwood. The Carlisle goalkeeper also required the application of a bandage on a head injury sustained in the opening half hour. Towards the end of the first half, Carlisle began to establish a foothold in the game and saw an effort by Hawley disallowed for offside. Soon after, a Zigor Aranalde long throw into the Swansea area was flicked on by Swansea's Kristian O'Leary into the path of Adam Murray who headed into the Swansea goal to equalise.

Westwood was called into action again early in the second half, saving two efforts in the opening minutes. The game saw few chances in the second half, the best opportunity falling to Carlisle's Holmes who saw his header cleared off the goal line by Sam Ricketts after an hour. Swansea retook the lead with nine minutes remaining with Trundle playing through Akinfenwa, who held off a challenge before shooting past Westwood. With ten minutes remaining, Carlisle pressed forward in the hope of finding an equalising goal. Their best chance fell to Murray who attempted an overhead kick which forced a save from Guéret. Swansea held onto their lead to win the match 2–1.

=== Match details ===
2 April 2006
13:30 BST

Carlisle United	1–2	Swansea City
Murray 40'	Report	Trundle 3'; Akinfenwa 81'

Millennium Stadium, Cardiff
Attendance: 42,028
Referee: Tony Leake (Lancashire)

Carlisle United	Swansea City

GK	20	Keiren Westwood
RB	15	Paul Arnison (yellow card)	(substituted off) 89'
CB	5	Danny Livesey
CB	6	Kevin Gray
CB	3	Peter Murphy
LB	21	Zigor Aranalde
CM	4	Chris Billy
CM	8	Chris Lumsdon
CM	11	Adam Murray (yellow card)	(substituted off) 79'
CF	9	Derek Holmes	(substituted off) 70'
CF	10	Karl Hawley
Substitutes:
GK	1	Anthony Williams
DF	14	Simon Grand	(substituted on) 89'
MF	7	Brendan McGill
MF	18	Simon Hackney	(substituted on) 79'
FW	16	Glenn Murray	(substituted on) 70'
Manager:
Paul Simpson

GK	27	Willy Guéret
RB	17	Keith Lowe
CB	5	Alan Tate
CB	16	Garry Monk
LB	2	Sam Ricketts
RM	4	Kristian O'Leary	(substituted off) 63'
CM	7	Leon Britton
CM	23	Owain Tudur Jones
LM	18	Andy Robinson	(substituted off) 83'
CF	9	Adebayo Akinfenwa
CF	10	Lee Trundle
Substitutes:
GK	1	Brian Murphy
DF	3	Kevin Austin
MF	6	Roberto Martínez	(substituted on) 83'
MF	11	Adrian Forbes
FW	24	Leon Knight	(substituted on) 63'
Manager:
Kenny Jackett

MATCH RULES

- 90 minutes.
- Penalty shoot-out if scores still level.
- Five named substitutes
- Maximum of 3 substitutions.

== Aftermath ==
In the immediate aftermath of the match, Swansea players Trundle and Tate caused controversy after displaying anti-Cardiff sentiment. Trundle wore a t-shirt featuring an image of a Swansea fan urinating on a Cardiff City shirt. He later claimed that he had put the shirt on without realising that the image was on the front and removed it shortly afterwards. Trundle made his way behind the goal where his teammates were celebrating and proceeded to hold a Welsh flag along with teammate Tate that had an anti-Cardiff obscenity written on it. Trundle again claimed afterwards that he was initially unaware what was written on the flag and dropped it when he realised. The actions were widely condemned, with South Wales Police, the Football League and the management of the Millennium Stadium all issuing statements following the incidents. South Wales Police received numerous complaints over the incident, including from Swansea fans, and as a result both players were arrested over public order offences. The pair were later issued with a caution, while the Football Association of Wales fined the players £2,000 and issued them with a one-match ban. Trundle later received death threats following the incident.

Regarding his goal, Trundle has described the effort as the best he scored during his career, remarking "Where it went in was probably the only place I could have put it, the technique and the occasion make it my favourite goal." The players returned to Morgans Hotel in Swansea where they held a party for their victory. The celebrations were however limited by manager Kenny Jackett who insisted on the team remaining focused on earning promotion from League One with seven league games remaining. His side went on to reach the 2006 Football League One play-off final the following month, losing to Barnsley in a penalty shootout with Tate missing the decisive spot kick. Despite the lack of a sponsor's prize fund, Swansea were estimated to have made around £400,000 from winning the final.

Carlisle manager Paul Simpson expressed his disappointment that his side had conceded such a late goal, commenting "The boys are gutted ... because we all feel that, over the match, we did enough to at least take it to extra-time." Simpson did however state that his "players should be proud of themselves." Carlisle went on to win promotion from League Two after finishing the season in first place. Simpson left the club at the end of the campaign to join Preston North End. As of July 2020, the club has reached two further Football League Trophy finals. They were defeated by Southampton in the 2010 final before beating Brentford the following year.
