= Guernica (disambiguation) =

Guernica is a Spanish Basque town and historical capital of Biscay.

Guernica or Gernika may also refer to:

== Places ==
- Guernica, Buenos Aires, district capital of Presidente Perón Partido in Argentina
- Urdaibai, a biosphere reserve also known as Gernika estuary

== Sports ==
- Gernika Club, a football club based in Guernica

== Events ==
- Bombing of Guernica, an attack on April 26, 1937, during the Spanish Civil War

== Arts, entertainment, and media ==
=== Films ===
- Guernica (1950 film), directed by Alain Resnais
- Guernica (1978 film), a short film directed by Emir Kusturica
- Guernica (2016 film), directed by Koldo Serra

=== Fine art ===
- Guernica (Picasso), by Pablo Picasso
- Guernica (sculpture), by René Iché

=== Music ===
- Gernika (opera), by Francisco Escudero
- Guernica (piano trio), by Octavio Vazquez

==== Groups and labels ====
- Guernica, a 1990s American post-punk/gothic rock band, predecessors to 2000s-2010s group Doll Factory
- Guernica, a British record label; subsidiary of 4AD

==== Songs ====
- "Guernica", a song from the 2000 album Zamiana Pieniędzy na Rebelię by Włochaty
- "Guernica", a song from the 2001 album Dumas by Dumas
- "Guernica", a song from the 2003 album Deja Entendu by Brand New
- "Guernica", a B-side to the single "Made of Stone" by the Stone Roses

=== Other arts, entertainment, and media ===
- Guernica (magazine), a magazine of art and politics
- Guernica Editions, a Canadian independent publisher
- Guernica Vandham, a character from Xenoblade Chronicles 3
