= Simon Grand =

English footballer (born 1984)

Personal information
- Date of birth: 23 February 1984 (age 42)
- Place of birth: Chorley, England
- Position: Defender

Team information
- Current team: Charnock Richard

Youth career
- Rochdale

Senior career*
Years	Team	Apps	(Gls)
2001–2004	Rochdale	40	(2)
2004–2007	Carlisle United	35	(4)
2007	→ Grimsby Town (loan)	2	(0)
2007	Grimsby Town	5	(0)
2007–2008	Morecambe	6	(1)
2008–2010	Northwich Victoria	63	(9)
2010–2011	Fleetwood Town	10	(1)
2010–2011	→ Mansfield Town (loan)	6	(0)
2011	→ Aldershot Town (loan)	6	(0)
2011–2013	Southport	83	(11)
2013–2014	AFC Telford United	35	(4)
2014–2016	Barrow	80	(6)
2016–2017	Salford City	40	(9)
2017–2018	AFC Fylde	35	(4)
2018–2022	Chester	121	(9)
2022–2023	Charnock Richard	43	(10)
2023–2024	Lancaster City	24	(3)
2024–2025	Bamber Bridge	60	(3)
2025–2026	Lancaster City	23	(2)
2026–	Charnock Richard	0	(0)

Managerial career
- 2024: Lancaster City (caretaker)
- * Club domestic league appearances and goals as of 8 September 2026

Simon Grand (born 23 February 1984) is an English footballer who plays as a defender for Charnock Richard.

He notably played in the Football League for Rochdale, Carlisle United, Grimsby Town, Morecambe and Aldershot Town, and in non-league football for Northwich Victoria, Fleetwood Town, Southport, Mansfield Town, AFC Telford United, Barrow, Salford City, AFC Fylde and Chester.

== Career ==
=== Rochdale ===
Born in Chorley, Grand started his career at Rochdale as a trainee in August 2001 and won the club's Young Player of the Year award in May 2002. He made his debut in a 2nd round FA Cup tie against Bristol Rovers in December 2002 and established himself in the first team, making 28 appearances in all competitions in the remainder of the 2002–03 season and helping Rochdale to the 5th round of the FA Cup in February 2003 where they were beaten by Wolves. He began the 2003–04 season in the first team and was a regular until January 2004 when, having made 21 appearances in all competition, he was dropped from the side following the arrival of new manager Steve Parkin. He made no further appearances for Rochdale and was released by the club in May 2004.

=== Carlisle United ===
Grand joined Conference National club, Carlisle United, in August 2004, after a successful trial. He scored on his debut against Tamworth in September 2004 and made 29 appearances in all competitions in the 2004–05 season as Carlisle won promotion to the Football League. Shortly before the end of the season, he signed a two-year contract keeping him at the club until 2007. In December 2005, he scored the match winning penalty as Carlisle beat Tranmere Rovers 11–10 on penalties in the Football League Trophy. However, he found it hard to get ahead of Kevin Gray, Danny Livesey and Peter Murphy in the centre back position and made only 14 appearances in the 2005–06 season as Carlisle clinched a second successive promotion as League Two champions. At the end of the season, Carlisle were willing to listen to offers for Grand and, after making a further six appearances for Carlisle in the 2006–07 season, he joined Grimsby Town.

=== Grimsby Town ===
Grand joined Grimsby Town in January 2007, initially on loan until the end of the 2006–07 season but signing a permanent 18-month deal two weeks later. However, after making only seven appearances for Grimsby, he was released in May 2007.

=== Morecambe ===
Grand joined Football League newcomers Morecambe in August 2007 on a 12-month deal, after a successful trial with the Christie Park club.

=== Non-League ===
After leaving Morecambe in the close season, Grand signed for Northwich Victoria on non-contract terms in August 2008. He signed a permanent contract until the end of the 2008–09 season in October.

Grand signed for Fleetwood Town prior to the start of the 2010–11 season and in October 2010, he joined Mansfield Town on loan making 9 appearances in the Conference League and FA Cup. In January 2011, he joined Aldershot Town on loan.

Prior to the start of the 2011–12 season Grand moved down the west coast of England to join Southport on a free transfer and made his competitive club debut on 13 August 2011 on the first day of the 2011–12 season. He scored his first Southport goal, heading their second goal in a 3–2 away win over Forest Green. Grand scored 3 more goals for Southport in the 2011–12 season, also captaining the side on occasion in the absence of club captain, Alan Moogan. On 28 June 2012, Grand was appointed Southport's new club captain, following Moogan's move to becoming player/coach.

Following his release from Southport, it was announced on the club site he joined Telford on 10 May 2013, linking up again with Liam Watson. On 26 April 2014 he won promotion to the Conference Premier with Telford after they clinched the Conference North title on the final game of the season.

On 20 May 2014, Grand joined Barrow, and was named as team captain in August 2014 for the upcoming 2014–15 season.

In July 2016 he joined Salford City.

He subsequently joined AFC Fylde.

=== Chester ===
In July 2018, 34-year-old Grand signed for Chester linking up with his former joint managers at Salford City Anthony Johnson and Bernard Morley and extended his contract for further year in May 2019. He restored strong partnership with experienced centre back Danny Livesey, formed earlier at Carlisle United in 2004–06, and rebuilt at Barrow in 2014–16.

Grand played every minute of every regular season game in his second year at Chester but not ruled out his retirement as the season was cut short due to pandemic and future was uncertain. After Chester lost his playoff game he agreed new contract ahead of the season 2020–21 season.

Grand made a 100th appearance for Chester on 2 January 2021 and agreed terms to remain for the 2021/22 campaign. He was released at the end of the 2021–22 season.

=== Further career ===
In July 2022, Grand signed on for North West Counties Premier Division side Charnock Richard, and scored an equaliser against Padiham on his debut.

Grand joined Lancaster City in the summer of 2023. During his first spell at the club, he made 24 league appearances and scored three league goals, while recording six goals in all competitions. Three of his goals came in an FA Cup qualifying victory over Marske United. He also briefly formed part of Lancaster's caretaker management team before leaving the club.

On 26 January 2024, Grand signed for fellow Northern Premier League Premier Division club Bamber Bridge. He reached 750 competitive career appearances while playing for Bamber Bridge in November 2024.

Grand returned to Lancaster City for a second spell on 25 November 2025 after leaving Bamber Bridge. He made 22 appearances during the remainder of the 2025–26 season, beginning with Lancaster's victory over Padiham in the Lancashire FA Challenge Trophy, and made a further three appearances at the beginning of 2026–27. His final appearance was as a substitute in a 1–0 league victory over Bury before his departure was announced in September 2026.

On 7 September 2026, Grand returned to Charnock Richard for a second spell.

== Career statistics ==
As of match played 16 April 2024

Appearances and goals by club, season and competition
Club	Season	League			FA Cup		League Cup		Other		Total	
Club	Season	Division	Apps	Goals	Apps	Goals	Apps	Goals	Apps	Goals	Apps	Goals
Rochdale	2002–03	Third Division	23	2	5	0	0	0	0	0	28	2
Rochdale	2003–04	Third Division	17	0	2	0	1	0	1 (Note: Appearance(s) in Football League Trophy)	0	21	0
Rochdale	Total		40	2	7	0	1	0	1	0	49	2
Carlisle United	2004–05	Conference Premier	23	2	4	0	—		2 (Note: One appearance in Football League Trophy and one appearance in FA Trophy)	1	29	3
Carlisle United	2005–06	League Two	8	2	1	0	1	0	4	1	14	3
Carlisle United	2006–07	League One	4	0	0	0	1	0	1	0	6	0
Carlisle United	Total		35	4	5	0	2	0	7	2	49	6
Grimsby Town	2006–07	League Two	7	0	0	0	—		0	0	7	0
Morecambe	2007–08	League Two	6	1	1	0	1	0	4	0	12	1
Northwich Victoria	2008–09	Conference Premier	34	5	0	0	—		0	0	34	5
Northwich Victoria	2009–10	Conference North	29	4	1	0	—		0	0	30	4
Northwich Victoria	Total		63	9	1	0	—		0	0	64	9
Fleetwood Town	2009–10	Conference North	6	1	0	0	—		0	0	6	1
Fleetwood Town	2010–11	Conference Premier	4	0	0	0	—		0	0	4	0
Fleetwood Town	Total		10	1	0	0	—		0	0	10	1
Mansfield Town (loan)	2010–11	Conference Premier	6	0	2	0	—		1 (Note: Appearance(s) in FA Trophy)	0	9	0
Aldershot Town (loan)	2010–11	League Two	6	0	—		0	0	0	0	6	0
Southport	2011–12	Conference Premier	42	4	1	0	—		1	0	44	4
Southport	2012–13	Conference Premier	41	7	1	0	—		2	0	44	7
Southport	Total		83	11	2	0	—		3	0	88	11
Telford United	2013–14	Conference North	35	4	0	0	—		2	0	37	4
Barrow	2014–15	Conference North	40	4	0	0	—		0	0	40	4
Barrow	2015–16	National League	40	2	0	0	—		2	0	42	2
Barrow	Total		80	6	0	0	—		2	0	82	6
Salford City	2016–17	National League North	40	9	0	0	—		2 (Note: Appearances in National League North play-offs)	0	42	9
AFC Fylde	2017–18	National League	35	4	4	1	—		2 (Note: One appearance in National League North play-offs and one appearance in FA Trophy)	0	41	5
Chester	2018–19	National League North	36	4	2	0	—		3 (Note: Two appearances in the FA Trophy and one in Cheshire Senior Cup)	0	41	4
Chester	2019–20	National League North	32	3	2	0	—		5 (Note: One appearance in National League North play-offs and four appearances in FA Trophy)	0	39	3
Chester	2020–21	National League North	17	1	3	0	—		2	0	22	1
Chester	2021–22	National League North	36	1	2	0	—		0	0	38	1
Chester	total		121	9	9	0	—		10	0	140	9
Charnock Richard	2022–23	NWCFL Premier Division	41	10	5	1	—		7 (Note: Three appearances in FA Vase, three appearances and one goal in Lancashire FA Challenge Trophy, one appearance in the North West Counties Football League Challenge Cup)	1	53	11
Charnock Richard	2023–24	NWCFL Premier Division	2	0	0	0	—		0	0	2	0
Charnock Richard	Total		43	10	5	1	—		7	1	55	12
Lancaster City	2023–24	NPL Premier Division	24	3	3	3	—		2 (Note: One appearance in FA Trophy, one appearance in Lancashire FA Challenge Trophy)	0	29	6
Bamber Bridge	2023–24	NPL Premier Division	11	0	—		—		0	0	11	0
Career total			645	73	39	5	4	0	43	3	731	81

== Managerial statistics ==
As of match played 9 April 2024

Managerial record by team and tenure
Team	From	To	Record					Ref
Team	From	To	P	W	D	L	Win %	Ref
Lancaster City (caretaker)	5 January 2024	26 January 2024	3	1	0	2	33.3	
Total			3	1	0	2	33.3	

== Honours ==
Carlisle United

- Football League Trophy runner-up: 2005–06

Individual

- Conference North Team of the Year: 2014–15
