= Beltrán Pagola =

Beltrán Pagola Goya (28 February 1878 in San Sebastián – 8 July 1950) was a Basque composer, pianist and teacher. He was professor at the Conservatory of Music (Conservatorio donostiarra) in San Sebastián. His music was often inspired by Basque folklore and other Basque motifs, including his Sinfonieta vasca and Humoradas vascas. He specialised in the study of musical harmony, and taught courses on Debussy and Ravel, among others. He was also influential as a teacher of the composers Pablo Sorozábal, Tomás Garbizu, José María Usandizaga and Francisco Escudero.
