= Tomás Garbizu =

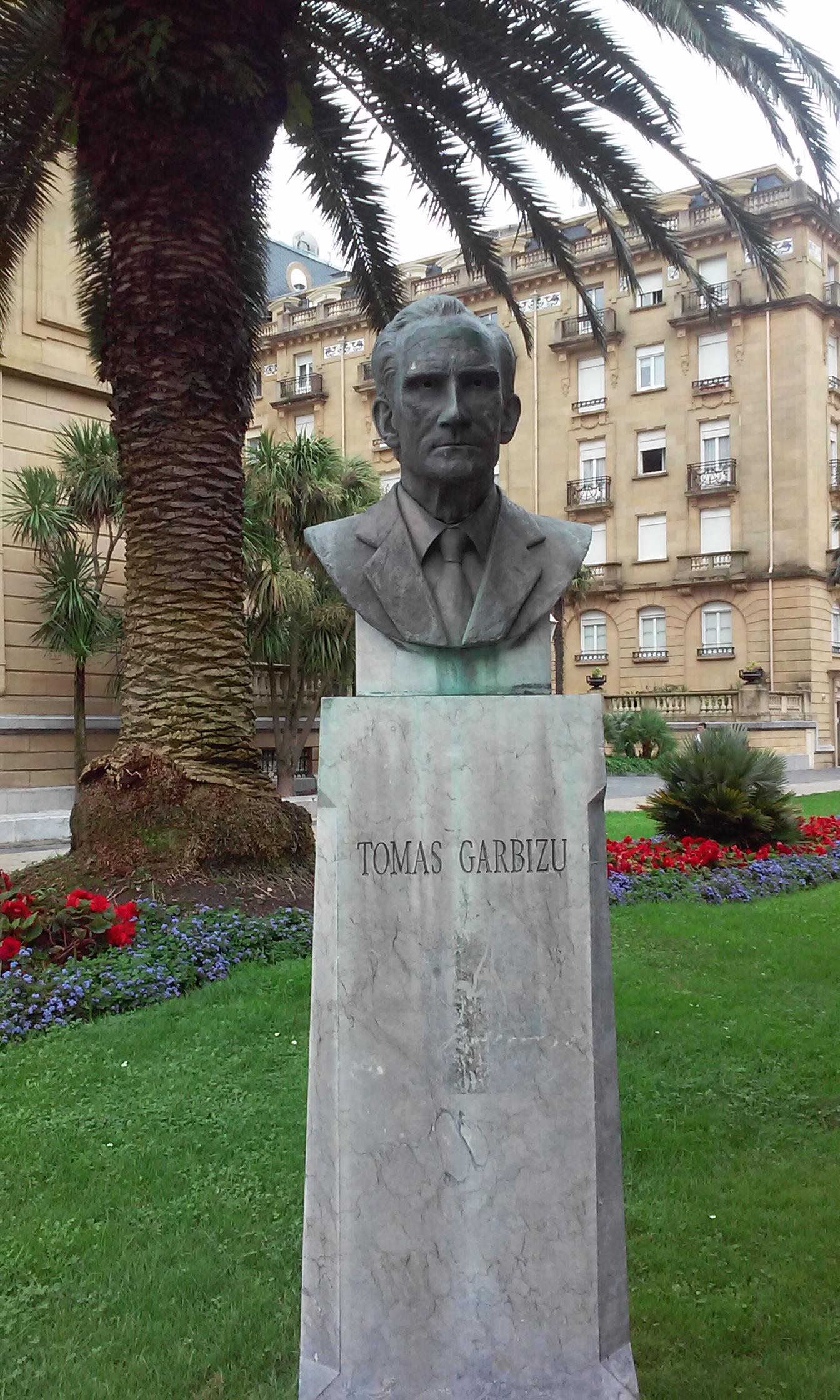

Background information
- Born: Tomás Garbizu Salaberria; 12 September 1901; Lezo, Spain
- Died: 27 November 1989 (aged 88) San Sebastián
- Occupation: Composer
- Instrument: Organ
- Years active: 1954–1989

Tomás Garbizu Salaberria (12 September 1901 – 27 November 1989) was a Basque composer. He was the youngest and last of the Basque nationalist music movement composers.

== Early life and education ==
Garbizu was born in Lezo, Guipázcoa, on 12 September 1901. He received first musical education in San Sebastián. His early teachers there were Josá Maráa Iraola and Beltrán Pagola. Then he studied organ in Madrid and Paris under Charles Lebout.

== Career ==
Garbizu worked at the San Sebastián Conservatory as an organ professor from 1954 to 1989, when he retired.

=== Recordings ===
- Tomás Garbizu: Piano Music. Álvaro Cendoya (piano). Naxos Spanish Classics
- Garbizu: Works for Txistu & Piano. Old San Sebastian Songs. Euskal suitea I. Guipuzcoan Dances. Jose Ignacio Ansorena (Txistu and Tamboril), Alvaro Cendoya (piano) Naxos Spanish Classics
- Garbizu: Basque Music Collection Vol.8 Misa Papa Juan XXIII. Ave Maria for Soprano and Orchestra. Cinco Canciones Vascas for Soprano and Orchestra. Olatz Saitua (soprano) Xavier de Maistre (harp) Esteban Elizondo (organ) Orfeon Donostiarra (choir) Basquen National Orchestra, Cristian Mandeal Claves

== Death ==
Garbizu died in San Sebastián on 27 November 1989.
