= Francisco Escudero (composer) =

Spanish musician (1912–2002)

- Born: Francisco Escudero García de Goizueta; 13 August 1912; Zarautz, Spain
- Died: 17 June 2002 (aged 89); San Sebastián, Spain
- Occupations: Violinist, composer and conductor

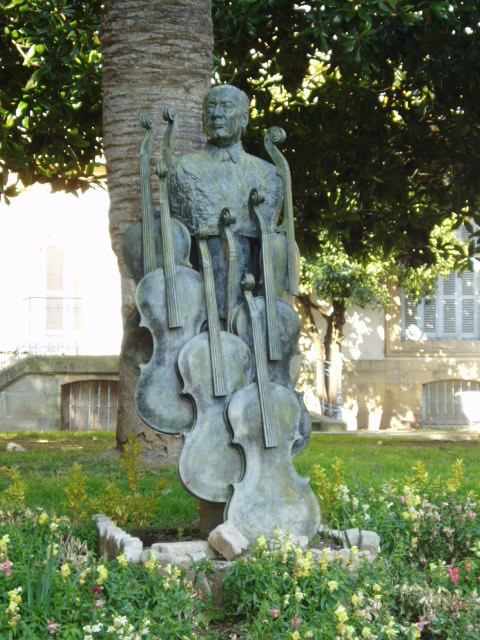
Monument to Francisco Escudero in Zarautz, Gipuzkoa

Francisco Escudero García de Goizueta (13 August 1912 – 17 June 2002) was a Basque violinist, composer and conductor.

== Life and career ==
He was born in Zarautz (Gipuzkoa), on 13 August 1912. He began his musical studies at the San Sebastián Municipal Music Academy with Beltrán Pagola, and continued in Madrid, where he was a Composition student of Conrado del Campo.

He was awarded the Spanish National Fine Arts Award (Premio Nacional de Bellas Artes) for his Trío bucólico in 1937. During the Spanish Civil War, he moved to France.

In 1945, he became director of the Coral de Bilbao.

He was awarded the Gold Medal of Merit in the Fine Arts.

In 1957, he obtained the National Music Prize.

In 196,0 he created the City of San Sebastián Band. He composed the opera Zigor, with a Basque theme, which premiered in Bilbao and then in Madrid and San Sebastián with great success, once again obtaining a National Music Award (second one).

As part of his teaching work, he directed the San Sebastián Municipal Higher Conservatory of Music. It was during this period, in 1979, that the historic San Sebastián conservatory was granted the capacity to teach the Superior Degree of music studies. His disciples are, among others, Javier Jacinto, José Luis Marco, Ramon Lazkano, Ángel Illarramendi, Alberto Iglesias, Roberto Bienzobas and most of the faculty at the San Sebastián Conservatory, as well as other musical centres in Spain.

== Awards ==
- Spanish National Fine Arts Award (Premio Nacional de Bellas Artes), 1937
- Gold Medal of Merit in the Fine Arts
- National Music Prize, 1957
- National Music Award (second one), 1960

== Selected works ==
- Pinceladas vascas
- Zigor
- Gernika
- Eusko Salmoa
- Sinfonía mítica
- Illeta
- Aránzazu (symphonic poem)
- Evocación en Itziar
- Concierto Vasco para piano y orquesta
- Concierto para violoncello y orquesta
- Sinfonía Sacra
- Fantasía geosinfónica
