= Zigor Aranalde =

Spanish footballer

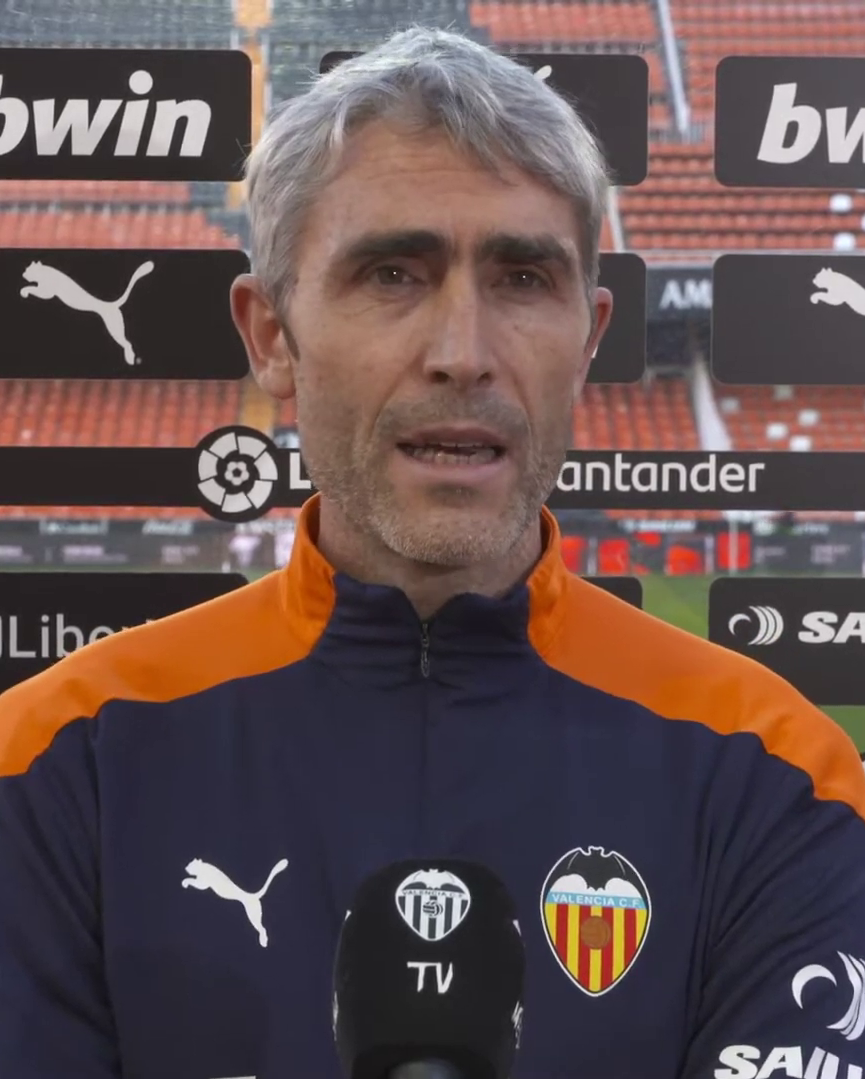
- Aranalde in 2021

Personal information
- Full name: Zigor Aranalde Sarasola
- Date of birth: 28 February 1973 (age 53)
- Place of birth: Ibarra, Spain
- Height: 1.85 m (6 ft 1 in)
- Position: Left-back

Senior career*
Years	Team	Apps	(Gls)
1991–1992	Hernani	33	(3)
1992–1994	Eibar	45	(1)
1994–1996	Atlético Marbella	56	(0)
1996–1997	Sevilla	22	(0)
1997–1999	Albacete	51	(2)
1999–2000	Logroñés	39	(1)
2000–2005	Walsall	195	(5)
2005	Sheffield Wednesday	2	(0)
2005–2008	Carlisle United	109	(6)
2008–2009	Almansa		
2009–2010	La Gineta		
Total		552	(18)

Managerial career
- 2011–2013: Albacete (assistant)
- 2018–2019: Watford (assistant)
- 2020–2021: Valencia (assistant)
- 2021–2023: Al Sadd (assistant)
- 2023: Leeds United (assistant)
- 2025–2026: Watford (assistant)
- * Club domestic league appearances and goals

Zigor Aranalde Sarasola (born 28 February 1973) is a Spanish former professional footballer who played as a left-back.

== Playing career ==
=== Early years ===
Born in Ibarra, Gipuzkoa, Aranalde began his career at lowly CD Hernani, going on to spend eight of his nine professional seasons in his country in the Segunda División.

In 1996–97, he was first choice at Sevilla FC in La Liga, but the Andalusians finished third-bottom so they were relegated.

=== England ===
Aranalde joined Football League Second Division club Walsall on a two-year contract, just before the start of 2000–01. He spent just under five seasons at the Bescot Stadium, winning promotion via the play-off final in his first year and being a regular member until he was surprisingly released by manager Paul Merson, in March 2005; he moved on to Sheffield Wednesday immediately following his release, but was sent off in only his second game for the side and never appeared for them again.

In the summer of 2005, Aranalde signed for Carlisle United, who went on to win the championship and promote from League Two. He scored five goals during the campaign, and was part of a squad which included two other former Walsall players, striker Karl Hawley and future Preston North End manager Paul Simpson; on 1 October, he netted Bristol Rovers' 5000th ever goal in a 1–3 loss, in his own net.

== Coaching career ==
On 16 May 2008, it was announced that Aranalde was being released from Carlisle alongside Paul Arnison and Grant Carson. Two years later, after playing some amateur football in his country, he returned to England in April 2010 when he was named chief scout at Brighton & Hove Albion in League One. He subsequently held the same position at West Bromwich Albion, later being part of the coaching staff of Albacete.

Aranalde was named assistant manager at Premier League team Watford in January 2018, following the appointment of his compatriot Javi Gracia. Both were fired on 8 September 2019, continuing to work together at Valencia CF, Al Sadd SC and Leeds United.

== Honours ==
Walsall

- Football League Second Division play-offs: 2001

Carlisle United

- Football League Two: 2005–06
- Football League Trophy runner-up: 2005–06
