= Karl Hawley =

English footballer (born 1981)

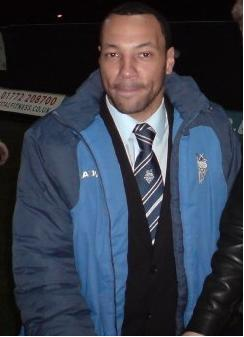

Personal information
- Full name: Karl Leon Hawley
- Date of birth: 6 December 1981 (age 44)
- Place of birth: Walsall, England
- Position: Striker

Senior career*
Years	Team	Apps	(Gls)
2000–2004	Walsall	1	(0)
2002–2003	→ Raith Rovers (loan)	17	(7)
2003	→ Hereford United (loan)	6	(1)
2003	→ Raith Rovers (loan)	9	(2)
2004	Hednesford Town	1	(0)
2004–2007	Carlisle United	118	(47)
2007–2009	Preston North End	30	(3)
2008	→ Northampton Town (loan)	11	(2)
2009	→ Colchester United (loan)	4	(0)
2009–2012	Notts County	81	(5)
2012	→ Crawley Town (loan)	4	(0)
2012–2013	Scunthorpe United	39	(11)
2013–2014	Torquay United	27	(3)
2014–2015	Alfreton Town	33	(10)
2015–2016	Stourbridge	46	(24)
2017	Boston United	19	(3)
2017–2018	Stafford Rangers		
2018	Sutton Coldfield		

International career
2004–2005	England C	2	(0)

Managerial career
- 2016: Mansfield Town (first team coach)
- 2017: Boston United (caretaker)
- * Club domestic league appearances and goals as of 16 April 2018

Karl Leon Hawley (born 6 December 1981) is an English retired professional footballer. He has represented the England C team.

== Career ==
=== Early career ===
Born in Walsall, West Midlands, Hawley started his career at his hometown club, Walsall, but made only one league appearance. During his time at the club, he had loan spells with Raith Rovers and Hereford United, where he scored his first senior goal against Burton Albion.

After being released by Walsall in 2004, he briefly joined Hednesford Town, but made just one start before being released at the end of the 2003–04 season.

=== Carlisle United ===
In the summer of 2004, Hawley joined Carlisle United in the Conference. He played a pivotal role in the club's return to the Football League, scoring 13 goals in his debut season and continuing to perform strongly the following year. In the 2005–06 season, Hawley was the top scorer in League Two, earning the League Two Fans' Player of the Year award and a place in the League Two Team of the Year. Carlisle also secured promotion to League One that season.

After three successful seasons, where he finished as the club's top scorer, Hawley left Carlisle in May 2007.

=== Preston North End and Other Clubs ===
Hawley signed with Preston North End in June 2007, where he initially found form but later struggled for playing time. Loan spells followed at Northampton Town and Colchester United, before signing with Notts County in August 2009. Despite his efforts, Hawley found it difficult to establish himself, and in 2012, he was released.

He subsequently had a short loan spell with Crawley Town and later signed for Scunthorpe United in September 2012. Hawley performed well at Scunthorpe, scoring five goals in 17 appearances, which led to a contract extension.

=== Later Career and Retirement ===
In 2013, Hawley signed for Torquay United but left the club in 2014 by mutual consent. He then joined Alfreton Town, where he had a successful spell, including scoring two goals in a notable victory over his former club, Carlisle United. After one season, Alfreton chose not to renew his contract.

Hawley later signed with Stourbridge in the summer of 2015 and went on to become the Evo-Stik League Premier Division Player of the Season in 2015–16. His playing career concluded with spells at Rushall Olympic and Boston United, before retiring from professional football.

== Coaching career ==
After his stint at Stourbridge, Hawley transitioned into coaching. In 2023, he continues to work in football, developing youth players and contributing to grassroots football programs. His most prominent coaching role came when he joined Mansfield Town as a first-team coach in 2016. In October 2017, he served briefly as the club's temporary manager before stepping down on 12 November 2017.

Since 2023, Hawley has been actively involved in coaching at various levels, focusing on youth development. He has been working with football academies in the West Midlands. Hawley has also been involved in several grassroots football initiatives aimed at increasing participation in the sport in underrepresented areas. He is also a regular guest on local football shows, providing insights into lower league football.

== Career statistics ==
As of match played 16 December 2017

Appearances and goals by club, season and competition
Club	Season	League			FA Cup		League Cup		Other		Total	
Club	Season	Division	Apps	Goals	Apps	Goals	Apps	Goals	Apps	Goals	Apps	Goals
Walsall	2000–01	Second Division	0	0	0	0	0	0	2 (Note: Appearances in Football League Trophy)	0	2	0
Walsall	2001–02	First Division	1	0	0	0	0	0	0	0	1	0
Walsall	2002–03	First Division	0	0	0	0	0	0	0	0	0	0
Walsall	2003–04	First Division	0	0	1	0	0	0	0	0	1	0
Walsall	Total		1	0	1	0	0	0	2	0	4	0
Raith Rovers (loan)	2002–03	Scottish Second Division	17	7	3	1	1	0	0	0	21	8
Hereford United (loan)	2002–03	Football Conference	6	1	0	0	—		0	0	6	1
Raith Rovers (loan)	2003–04	Scottish First Division	9	2	0	0	1	0	0	0	10	2
Hednesford Town	2003–04	SFL - Premier Division	1	0	0	0	—		0	0	1	0
Carlisle United	2004–05	Conference National	40	13	4	0	—		3 (Note: One appearance in FA Trophy and two in Conference National play-offs)	0	47	13
Carlisle United	2005–06	League Two	46	22	1	0	1	0	7	4	55	26
Carlisle United	2006–07	League One	32	12	1	0	2	0	0	0	35	12
Carlisle United	Total		118	47	6	0	3	0	10	4	137	51
Preston North End	2007–08	Championship	25	3	3	2	1	0	—		29	5
Preston North End	2008–09	Championship	5	0	0	0	2	0	0	0	7	0
Preston North End	Total		30	3	3	2	3	0	0	0	36	5
Northampton Town (loan)	2008–09	League One	11	2	0	0	—		0	0	11	2
Colchester United (loan)	2008–09	League One	4	0	0	0	—		0	0	4	0
Notts County	2009–10	League Two	31	3	5	1	1	0	1	0	38	4
Notts County	2010–11	League One	24	0	4	0	0	0	1	0	29	0
Notts County	2011–12	League One	26	2	3	2	1	0	1	1	31	5
Notts County	Total		81	5	12	3	2	0	3	1	98	9
Crawley Town (loan)	2011–12	League Two	4	0	—		—		0	0	4	0
Scunthorpe United	2012–13	League One	39	11	1	0	0	0	0	0	40	11
Torquay United	2013–14	League Two	27	3	1	0	1	0	1	0	30	3
Alfreton Town	2014–15	Conference Premier	34	10	2	1	—		2 (Note: Appearances in FA Trophy)	0	38	11
Stourbridge	2015–16	NPL - Premier Division	46	24	3	1	—		3	0	52	25
Rushall Olympic	2016–17	NPL - Premier Division	?	?	?	?	—		?	?	?	?
Boston United	2016–17	National League North	10	2	0	0	—		0	0	10	2
Boston United	2017–18	National League North	9	1	1	0	—		0	0	10	1
Boston United	Total		19	3	1	0	0	0	0	0	20	3
Career total			447	118	33	8	11	0	21	5	512	131

== Honours ==
Carlisle United

- Football League Two: 2005–06
- Conference National play-offs: 2005
- Football League Trophy runner-up: 2005–06

Notts County

- Football League Two: 2009–10

Individual

- PFA Fans' Player of the Year: 2005–06 League Two
- PFA Team of the Year: 2005–06 Football League Two, 2006–07 Football League Two
- Football League Two Player of the Year: 2006–07
- Evo-Stik League Supporter's Player of the Season: 2015–16
- Evo-Stik League Premier Division Player of the Season: 2015–16
