= Graham Deakin (footballer) =

English footballer and manager

Personal information
- Full name: Graham Lee Deakin
- Date of birth: 24 April 1987 (age 39)
- Place of birth: Birmingham, England
- Position: Midfielder

Team information
- Current team: Stafford Rangers (assistant manager)

Youth career
- –2006: Walsall

Senior career*
Years	Team	Apps	(Gls)
2006–2007	Walsall	0	(0)
2006	Tamworth	5	(0)
–2014	Sutton Coldfield Town		
2014	Rushall Olympic		
2014–????	Sutton Coldfield Town		

Managerial career
- 2020–2022: Hednesford Town (assistant)
- * Club domestic league appearances and goals as of 00:00, 23 October 2020 (UTC)

Graham Lee Deakin (born 24 April 1987) is an English footballer manager and former player who is the Manager (and previously the Assistant Manager) of Northern Premier League Division One West side Stafford Rangers. As a player, he spent most of his career playing as a midfielder.

== Playing career ==
=== Walsall ===
Deakin played one first team match for Walsall in the Football League Trophy semi final on 24 January 2006.

Walsall met Swansea City in the semi-final, Swansea City took an early lead through Leon Knight. Walsall eventually equalised through an Alex Nicholls goal in the second half. Andy Robinson gave Swansea the lead in the 83rd minute but his goal was quickly cancelled out by an equaliser from James Constable which sent the match to extra-time. Deakin was introduced to the action during extra-time, coming on as a 108th-minute substitute for David McDermott. The match eventually required a penalty shoot-out. The opening eight penalties were all successfully converted before the following four were all missed. The shootout ended when Deakin missed his side's eighth penalty, allowing Alan Tate to convert the winning penalty for Swansea.

=== Tamworth ===
Deakin signed for Conference National side Tamworth on loan on the 31 August 2006.

=== Sutton Coldfield Town ===
Following a brief spell with Rushall Olympic, Deakin returned to sign for Sutton Coldfield Town on 24 August 2014.

== Coaching career ==
In October 2024, Deakin joined Stafford Rangers as assistant manager.

He was recently promoted to Manager of Stafford Rangers.

== Personal life ==
Deakin's father, Graham Sr., died in 2022 from injuries sustained while trying to take his own life. Subsequently, Deakin has helped to set up a West Midlands mental health hub specifically for men, as well as linking up with non-profit organisation Sport Against Suicide.

== Career statistics ==
=== Club ===
As of match played 27 October 2020

Appearances and goals by club, season and competition
Club	Season	League			National Cup		League Cup		Other		Total	
Club	Season	Division	Apps	Goals	Apps	Goals	Apps	Goals	Apps	Goals	Apps	Goals
Walsall	2006–07	League 2	0	0	0	0	0	0	1	0	1	0
Tamworth (loan)	2006–07	Football Conference	5	0	0	0	—		0	0	5	0
Career total			5	0	0	0	0	0	1	0	6	0
