= Zigor =

French sculptor

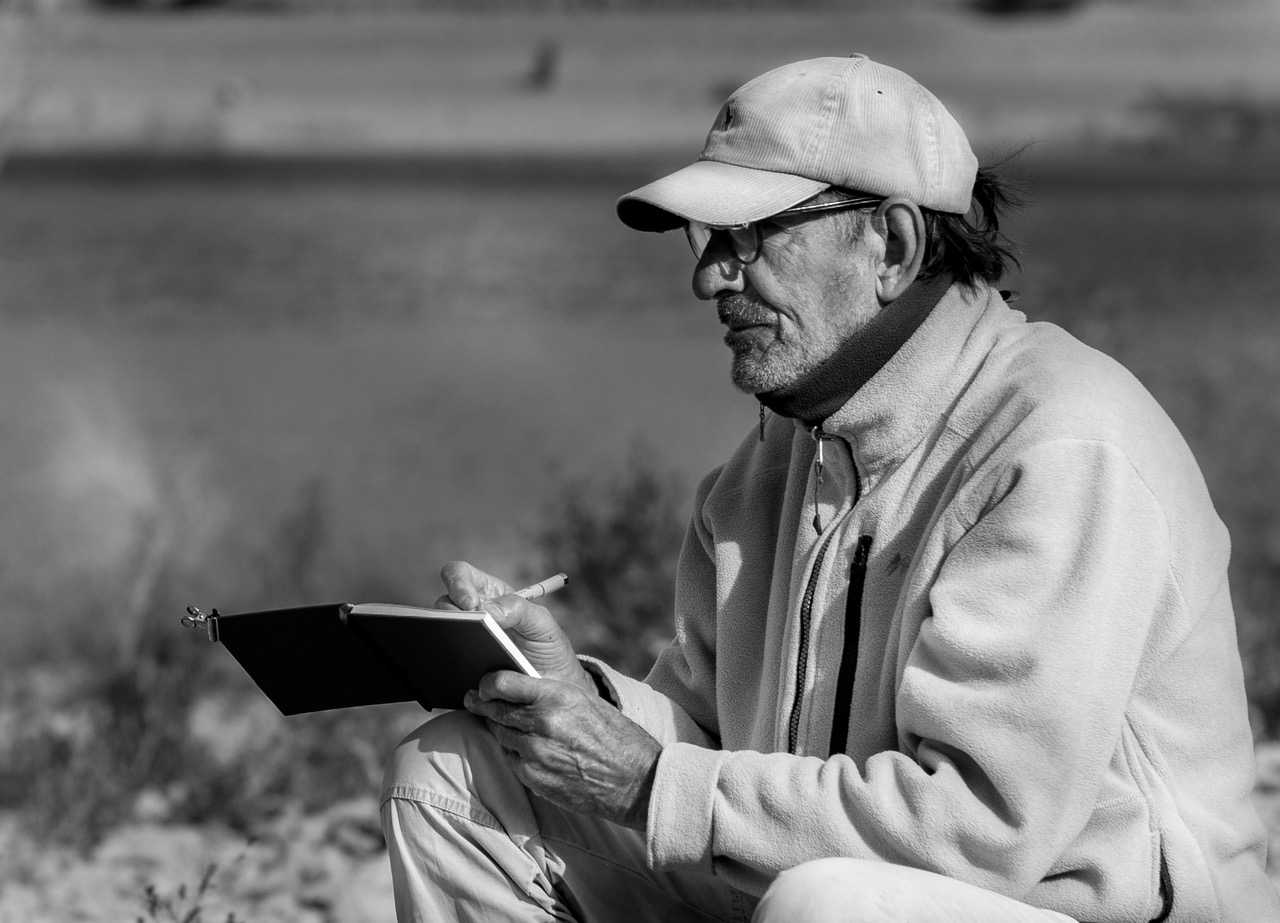
- Born: Kepa Akixo; 1947 (age 78–79); Aretxabaleta (Spain)
- Known for: Sculpture; Poetry; Photography
- Notable work: Biarritz
- Website: https://www.zigor-art.com/

Kepa Akixo, also known as Zigor, is a sculptor, photographer, artist and poet. He was born in 1947 in Aretxabaleta (located in the Spanish province of Gipuzkoa), in the Southern Basque Country.

His poems were published as of 1973, and he travelled the world as a photojournalist for various news outlets and magazines, as well as the Capa press agency until 1982. In 1983, he began sculpting and joined a community of contemporaries from the region. Zigor draws inspiration from his native environment, exploring thematics of naturalistic, organized chaos and interconnectedness through sculptures, photographs, paintings and poems.

== Biography ==
=== Early life, political activism and writing ===
Kepa Akixo was born in 1947 and grew up in a mountain village in the province of Guipuzcoa, in the Southern Basque Country. Somewhat of a tearaway child and a recalcitrant student, at the age of eleven he joined the Catholic seminary boarding school in Saturraran where he discovered the ocean and biblical texts. Encountering the metaphysics and profundity of both the sea and sacred writings was a decisive factor in Zigor's development as an autodidact. At the age of 14, he worked as a fitter and turner, and excelled in the sport of Basque pelota. Reflexes conditioned as a labourer and pelotari were to have a significant impact on his artistic kinesics to come, with repeated momentum from the wall to the work.

For several years, from the age of 16, Kepa Akixo became fully committed to political activism in the midst of the Franco dictatorship. In addition to spiritual texts, he wrote of resistance striving for a free Basque Country, both its entity and its language. It was during this period that he adopted his nom de plume Zigor, the Basque word for "whip", and laid bare the roots of organic poetry in which fragility is revealed at its most robust, whether in nature, form or humankind.

It was in the early 1970s that Zigor published his first collections of poems in the Basque language, and he has been published every year since in two Basque reviews, Poesiaren hatsa and Maiatz. His poems, a cross between solitary strolls and haïkus, are now translated in French, Spanish and English.

"I am the son of a language that made a people. Of a language that, in mulling over the world, shaped the landscape. I am the son of a language, and this language has given shape to song, dreams and silence. I shout it out so that it reaches you." (Excerpt from Zigor's Son of a Language.

=== Photography and travels ===
In 1977, Zigor becomes a photojournalist for major news magazines and the Capa press agency. Shooting on a Leica, he travelled extensively until 1982, most notably in and around the Sahara desert. He recounts these experiences as having chronicled a shared fabric between land and language. This influenced his photographic point of view, relying on what gradually became an intuitive and increasingly artistically-minded approach to the medium. After a several year hiatus following his career as a photojournalist, he rekindled his relationship with photography in the 2010s as an artist. He opted primarily for black and white, believing colour to be a distraction.

=== An appointment with sculpture ===
It was in 1983, upon being commissioned to take a portrait of the sculptor Remigio Mendiburu, that Zigor ventured into his subject's workshop in Hondarribia. It was on this trip that he decided to devote himself to his artistic practice. He set up a workshop in Biarritz, associating with Basque Country sculptors such as Nestor Basterretxea, Eduardo Chillida, Jorge Oteiza.

== Body of work and artistic process ==
=== The sketchbook ===
Sketchbooks offer a window into an artist’s imagination, tracing the origins of their work. Sketches, outlines, and rough drawings capture the early murmurs of creation, fresh and vivid, like a feeling taking form. A few words, but not yet a sentence, that the exchange with substance will later reveal.

"The sketch is a humble stone pointing the way between thought and hand." — Zigor, The sketch.

=== Painting or the extension of a stroke ===
Painting (watercolour, chalk, oil, gouache, acrylic or walnut ink) is the same process that spills out of the sketchbook to take on all its magnitude, sometimes on canvases measuring 3m50, hoisted like imaginary fronton pelota walls.

"The stroke hits the wall and the poetry can be heard leaving on its way to eternity."

— Zigor

=== Sculpture ===
Zigor's work explores several materials and elements in order to convey the same density: wood (oak, plane tree, chestnut and beech), bronze, steel. Happenstance seems to play a role in each work that expresses mass and movement, separation and fusion, fracture and regained balance.

A struggle can be detected between volumes, gravity and space that, by ingenious innate order, end up by merging and falling back into place. Zigor's sculptures, witnesses to this "organized chaos", have no end. The lines seamlessly fuse and each angle of vision portrays a new piece that invites wind, water and light to pass through it.

"The sculptor's work is to open up a pathway for the light."

— Zigor, The sculptor's path

Zigor's sometimes gigantic constructions draws his source of inspiration from the drop of water that bends a blade of grass without snapping it, to the wings of birds that withstand all the winds that blow.

Dimensions of spirituality and identity subtly occupy Zigor's work. "I sculpt like I pray", he says and this state of consciousness, embracing perception of beauty and hard-won freedom, also recounts a captive state of nothingness, convinced that poetry can perceptibly change the world.

"In the shadow of sculptures hides darkness,

And in darkness the shape of mystery,

And in mystery all the shapes."

- Zigor, In the shadow of sculptures

=== From infinitely small to monumental ===
In 1996, after meeting the art dealer Paul Haim, Zigor decided to begin working in bronze. He is cited as being fascinated with the particular play of light on the material.

"In some sculptures, light penetrates never to emerge. It stays inside as if absorbed by the dark hole of eternity. However, light penetrates other sculptures and, without traversing them, reappears transformed. And in some, light gushes out of the other side like water from a mountain."

— Zigor

Zigor's monumental sculptures are represented in numerous collections in the Basque Country, Spain, Australia (Sydney), the United States (Washington and New York), Switzerland and Argentina. They stand in private gardens and public spaces, like the Urkulu fountain in Biarritz, witness to a rock's melancholy on seeing the wave recede.

"The sculpture is not the structure in bronze but rather the water that sings inside it."

– Zigor, Urkulu.

From there, Zigor creates a totemic work representing an imagined rendition of the Basque Country.

"The landscape that surrounds me has always moved me and accompanied me in my deeper understanding of the world. When I sculpt, paint, take photographs and write, I'm just trying to recount this feeling. In the creative act, my little sketchbooks are very often the source of most of my works. But the pieces themselves follow very mysterious paths connected not only to the medium and tool used but also my doubts and my courage. Especially courage, which is necessary in order to continue along the path dictated by what appears in front of me. Honouring mishaps is the cornerstone of the creative act. What a mistake it would be to believe that I could improve or solve the unsolvable. I don't know what the sculptures and paintings will be. It's only a perpetual attempt to keep alive the inspiration that galvanized me at the start."

== Chronology of his works ==
=== Sculpture, major exhibitions ===
- 2021; Egu iturria, la source de l'aube, Espace muséal du Bellevue - Biarritz
- 2019; Rendez-vous avec Zigor, Galerie Dehoux - Saint-Jean-de-Luz
- 2018 ; Itzalean ikusi, voir dans l'ombre, Espace muséal du Bellevue - Biarritz
- 2014; Le silence des formes, Musée de la Vallée de la Creuse - Eguzon-Chantôme
- 2013 ; Le silence des formes, Galerie Maison Gérard - New York
- 2012 ; Ibaiadar, Galerie Hegoa, Carré Rive Gauche - Paris
- 2011 ; Du dessin à la sculpture, Galerie Arrêt sur l'image - Bordeaux
  - Zigor sculptures, Galerie Hegoa, Carré Rive Gauche - Paris
- 2010; Formes nues, Base sous-marine - Bordeaux
- 2009 ; Jardins jardin, Jardin des Tuileries - Paris
- 2007; Art Paris, Grand Palais - Paris
- 2006; Villa Beatrix Enea - Anglet
- 2003; Maison de la Culture - Ostabat
- 2002; Musée Basque et de l'Histoire de Bayonne - Bayonne
  - Espace Atlantica – Biarritz
  - Galeria Epelde & Mardaras - Bilbao
- 2000; Espace muséal du Bellevue - Biarritz
- 1994; Palais des Festivals - Biarritz
- 1990; Musée Bonnat - Bayonne

Zigor is represented by the Maison Gerard Gallery in New York

=== Photography, major exhibitions ===
- 2021; Egu iturria, la source de l'aube, Espace muséal du Bellevue - Biarritz
- 2019 ; Mendiak eta itsasoa, montagnes et mer, Galerie Hegoa - Paris
- 2018 ; Itzaletik at, Médiathèque - Biarritz
- 2015; Jardins dévoilés, Base Sous-Marine - Bordeaux
- 2013 ; Zigor photographies, Galerie Hegoa, Carré Rive Gauche – Paris

Zigor is represented by Galerie Hegoa in Paris

=== Monumental sculptures, private collections ===
- 2021; Gurutze XI - Église Saint-Rémi, Bordeaux
- 2020; Bikote VIII - New York, USA
  - Hega VII - Mont de Marsan, France
- 2018; Dantza IV - Lahonce, France
  - Olerki XVIII - Guethary, France
- 2017; Loturak VI - Echichens, Switzerland
- 2016; Alea III - Washington, USA
- 2015; Alea I - Saint-Paul-de-Vence, France
  - Olerki VII - Sydney, Australia
- 2013; Gurutze III - Lahonce, France
- 2012; Etxea - Urrugne, France
- 2010; Lore - Pomerol, France et Mendoza, Argentine
- 2008; Dantza - Guéthary, France
- 1998; Bikote VIII – La Petite Escalère - Saint-Laurent-de-Gosse, France

=== Monumental sculptures, public collections ===
- 2015 ; La fontaine Urkulu - Biarritz, France
- 2011; Txoria - Anglet, France
  - Olerki VII - Biarritz, France
- 2002; Eguskilore - Musée Basque et de l'Histoire de Bayonne - Bayonne, France
- 2004; Olatua - Museo Maritimo – Bilbao, Spain
- 1990; Bikote - Museo de Bellas Artes de Alava – Vitoria, Spain

=== Publications (edit) ===
- 2021; Egu iturria, la source de l'aube, sculptures, peintures, poésie et photographies - Kilika éditions
- 2019; Carnet de dessin, dessins - Maison Gérard éditions
- 2018; Itzalean ikusi, voir dans l'ombre, sculptures, peintures et poésie - Kilika éditions
- 2016 ; Silences, photographies et poésie - Kilika éditions
- 2010 ; Zigor Kepa Akixo, sculptures - Atlantica Séguier éditions
- 2007 ; Zigor carnet, dessins - Atlantica Séguier éditions
- 2000 ; Zigor Kepa Akixo, sculptures et dessins - Atlantica Séguier éditions.

Annual edition of poems in the publications Maiatz and Poesiaren Hatsa

=== Documentary films (edit) ===
- 2019; Exposition Mendiak eta itsasoa, Galerie Hegoa Paris artsinthecity
- 2018; Itzalean ikusi, Boisakré Production
  - Exposition Itzalean Ikusi, TVPI
  - Zigor à Biarritz, Itzalean Ikusi, Maria Mangas
- 2017; Portrait, Txirrita France 3
- 2017; Zalmaltzain, fresque éphémère, Olivier Péant
  - Fresque éphémère, Corrida Goyesque, TVPI
- 2011; Zigor, sculpteur basque, un film de Caroline de Otero Boisakré Production
- 2010; Le monde de Zigor, France 3.
