= Gernika (opera) =

Opera by Francisco Escudero

- by Francisco Escudero
- Librettist: Francisco Escudero; Carmelo Iturria; Augustin Zubikarai
- Language: Basque
- Based on: a plot by Luis Iriondo
- Premiere: 25 April 1987; Teatro Arriaga, Bilbao, Spain

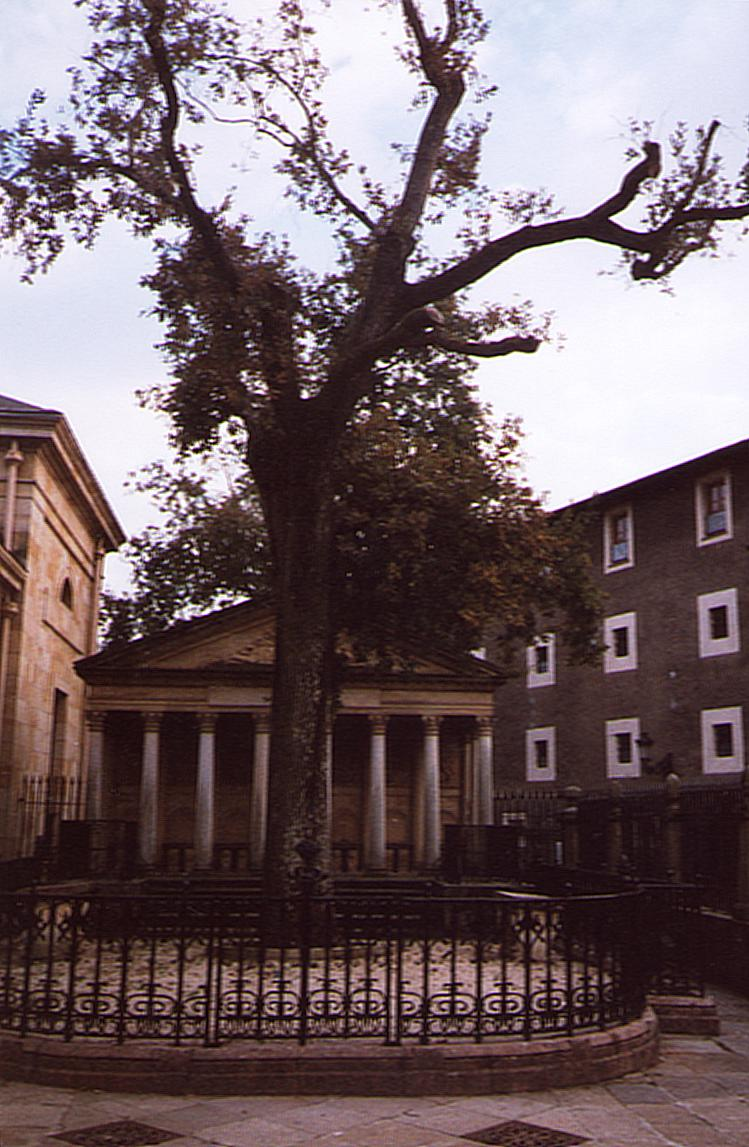
Gernikako Arbola, the Gernika oak where the lords of Biscay (including several kings of Castile and Spain) came to take the oath of respect for Fueros (Rules and Rights).

Gernika is Francisco Escudero's second opera, written in 1985. The libretto was written by Escudero with the assistance of Carmelo Iturria and Augustin Zubikarai, and based on an idea for a plot by Luis Iriondo.

The opera consists of four acts, and is about 2 hours long. Gernika was first presented in concert version in the Arriaga Theatre in Bilbao on the 25th of April, 1987, with several other works as part of a commemoration on the 50th anniversary of the bombing of Guernica.

In January 1938, he was paid 1000 Francs to compose a Basque stage production entitled Guernica, which had been requested by the Basque cultural organization "Eresoinka". Unfortunately the score was lost. The Eresoinka documents which have been preserved expressly indicate that the work never made it to the stage. After the tragedy of 1937, the name Guernica had become associated with the horror of the war and fascism; the opera may not have been staged at this time because of its political sensitivity.

In essence, Gernika is a song of the Basque Country. Escudero put all his beliefs about history and nature of the community to which he belongs into this work. He presented the Basque Country as a free country with its own personality, peaceful, continuing the traditions of ancestors, who have always remained united.

== Characters ==
- Gernika, Young, beautiful, clairvoyant, force of the town and secret love of Gogor. Soprano
- Podio, Leader of the royal militia, ambitious, disloyal, cruel, lover turned down by Gernika. Baritone
- Gogor ['strong'], Young, well-built, passionate, untrusting with the intrusive people, secret love of Gernika. Tenor
- Aitona ['grandfather'], Old, wise, source of authority. Bass
- King, King of the North, noble, true to his word, sensitive, fair. Baritone
- Publio, Confidante of the King of the North, loyal. Tenor

== Synopsis ==
ACT I:
Scene 1: The opera starts with Gernika, the heroine, onstage. The lovers, Gernika and Gogor, see armed people in the forest and decide to warn Aitona as soon as possible.

Scene 2: The armed group (led by the King of the North), announce that the King of the South is trying to conquer the entire world and he offers the Basques his protection in exchange for which the Basques become his subjects. He promises to respect their freedom, personality, customs and the old laws of the country.

ACT II:
Scene 1: Podio, entranced by the beauty of Gernika, tries to possess her. Gernika refuses him, causing him to become furious and threaten to destroy her and her Basque country.

Scene 2: Podio, in the name of the King, announces to the Basque country that they must help the monarch with men and money. The Basques respond that they are a free country and the petition goes against the pact they've signed with the King. Despite this, disagreements arise among the Basques, for and against the suggestions of Podio. Aitona cries for the country while the women proclaim liberty and union among the Basques.

ACT III:
Scene 1: The evil and ambitious Podio tries unsuccessfully to kill the King of the North. Scene 2: Gernika again predicts the devastation of her country. Scene 3: The historical bombarding of the town of Gernika (1937) is represented.

ACT IV:
Scene 1: Under cover of night's darkness, Podio attacks, kills and burns Gernika. On seeing such an atrocity Gogor tries to get revenge for the death of his loved one, but Aitona stops him: it's not worth it to stain your sword with venomous blood. The King will take charge of Podio's punishment. The opera ends with a meeting in which Gernika remains in the memory of the Basque Country, "Gernika has fallen but is not lost!"

== See also ==
- Zigor

== Discography ==
Information extracted from the libretto that accompanies the recording of Gernika (including an article by Basque musicologist Itziar Larrinaga), realised in November and December 2007. Title of the CD: GERNIKA (Francisco Escudero) Symphonic Orchestra of Euskadi, Choir Society of Bilbao, Jose Ramon Encinar (musical director) DECCA, 2CD (0028947667957)
