= Zigor (opera) =

1967 opera by Francisco Escudero

Zigor!
- by Francisco Escudero
- Translation: Punishment
- Librettist: Manuel Lekuona; Francisco Escudero
- Language: Basque
- Based on: a story by José Zinkunegi
- Premiere: 4 October 1967; Coliseo Albia, Bilbao, Spain

Zigor! (Basque for: Punishment!) is the first opera in four acts written by Francisco Escudero between 1957 and 1963, commissioned by the Bilbao Association of Friends of the Opera (Asociación Bilbaína de Amigos de la Ópera, ABAO.) Its libretto was written in Basque by Manuel Lekuona and Escudero. It is based on a story by José Zinkunegi.

Zigor!' first performance was an abridged concert version on 4 October 1967 in the Coliseo Albia in Bilbao. One year later, on 6 June 1968, it was presented for the first time in the Zarzuela Theatre in Madrid.

== Characters ==
- Zunbeltz, Antihero, child killer, ambitious, cruel and a traitor. Father of Lore and uncle of Sancho Garcés – bass or baritone
- Sancho Garcés, hero, aspiring to be the first King of Navarra designated by the divine providence, in love with Lore – tenor
- Urdaspal – baritone
- Burni ['iron'] – basso profondo
- Lore ['flower'], heroine, daughter of Zunbeltz, young, beautiful, personifies all the values of the town – soprano
- Sorgin ['witch'], daughter of a Norman who lives in the Basque lands – contralto
- San León, Bishop of Bayonne – baritone

== Synopsis ==
Zigor! starts with three fairies chanting about the grim future of the Basque Country (the invasion of the Normans and the betrayal of Zunbeltz). However, these fairies also announce a plentiful era which will arrive with Sancho Garcés, destined to be the first King of Navarre, guide of the Basques.

Zunbeltz defies God and vows to claim the crown. His first action is an unsuccessful attempt on the life of the infant Sancho Garcés; he kills the wrong baby. When Garces becomes a man, Zunbeltz accuses him of double treason: patriotic treason (for dealings with the Normans who are destroying the Basque coasts) and treason of love (a romance with Sorgin, the daughter of a Norman who lives in the Basque lands).

San León assures the captured Basques that God will break their chains, allowing them to defeat the enemy, as anything that disrupts or circumvents the divine balance will be punished. This is where the title Zigor!, punishment, comes from.

At the end of the opera, the punishment begins: the Normans who try to gain power in Navarre lands are punished with defeat. The evil Zunbeltz is punished both psychologically (remorse, hallucinations, murder of a child) and physically, when he accidentally wounds his daughter, Lore, fatally.

== See also ==
- Gernika (1985), Escudero's second opera

== Discography ==
- Information extracted from the libretto that accompanies the recording of Gernika, realised in November and December 2007. Symphonic Orchestra of Euskadi, Choir Society of Bilbao, José Ramón Encinar (musical director). DECCA, 2 CD (0028947667957)
