= Stafford Rangers F.C. =

Association football club in Stafford, England

Stafford Rangers
- Full name: Stafford Rangers Football Club
- Nicknames: Boro', Rangers,
- Founded: 1876; 150 years ago
- Ground: Marston Road, Stafford
- Capacity: 3,130 (526 Seated)
- President: Nathan Owen & George Bruneau
- Chairman: John MacMillan
- Manager: Graham Deakin
- League: Northern Premier League Division One West
- 2025–26: Northern Premier League Division One West, 17th of 22
- Website: staffordrangersfc.co.uk
Home colours	Away colours

Stafford Rangers Football Club is a semi-professional English football team from Stafford which plays in the Northern Premier League Division One West.

The team wear black and white stripes with black shorts. Stafford Rangers' rivals include Tamworth, Hednesford Town, Burton Albion and Telford United.

== History ==
=== Early history ===
Despite extensive research, no one has been able to prove conclusively when Stafford Rangers was actually formed, as early minute books were destroyed during the First World War. Rangers' formation year is recognised as 1876 because of articles in the local Advertiser newspaper, but an alternative theory on Rangers' formation date, printed in the Sentinel newspaper during 1891, suggests that the club was founded by a Bible class in 1877.

Rangers' early matches were cup games and friendlies, with the club reaching the FA Cup First Round in both 1884–85 and 1885–86. The club then had spells in the Shropshire League, Birmingham League and North Staffordshire League up to the turn of the century, and moved to their present Marston Road home in 1896. In 1900–01 Stafford rejoined the Birmingham League and in 1904–05 had an FA Cup run to the last Qualifying Round, losing in a replay at Second Division Blackpool.

Rangers were demoted to the Birmingham Combination in 1912 but won the championship at the first attempt (1912–13) and then finished runners-up in two of the next four seasons either side of the First World War. Rangers won the Birmingham League title in 1926–27, twice finished runners-up (1928–29 and 1929–30) and were twice third in five memorable seasons. During this period a total of 542 league goals were scored with striker Eddie Cameron regularly scoring goals. Due to financial troubles the team spent the mid to late 1930s struggling to avoid re-election and in one game were so short of players that the club secretary R.P. Brown had to play and actually scored a goal. During April 1935 a successful appeal for £100 to pay creditors enabled the club to survive. When war broke out in 1939, Rangers participated in an emergency Birmingham League during the 1939–40 season, finishing as runners-up, and then disbanded.

=== Post-war ===
After the Second World War the club reformed and played in the Birmingham Combination for six seasons, achieving a highest position of 6th in 1950–51. With a view to progress, Rangers joined the Cheshire County Football League in 1952 and finished 3rd in the 1954–55 season. However, Rangers' spell in the Cheshire Football League was generally one of struggle and during the early 1960s financial difficulties again threatened the club's existence. There were, however, some positive results, including the seven goals scored by Les Box in an 11–0 FA Cup victory over Dudley Town during September 1957.

In 1965, the appointment of Colin Hutchinson as manager started an improvement. Rangers won the 1967–68 Cheshire League Cup and following season finished as Cheshire League runners-up to earn a place in the Northern Premier League.

The seventies were the most successful era in the club's history. With Roy Chapman as manager, the club recorded a Northern Premier League Championship, FA Trophy and Staffordshire Senior Cup treble in season 1971–72, with Ray Williams scoring a club record of 48 goals in a single season. However, they did not apply for election to the Football League, and have never since finished high enough to enter the Football League.

Three seasons later Rangers progressed to the FA Cup Fourth round defeating Stockport County, Halifax Town and Rotherham United on the way to a defeat against Peterborough United in front of a crowd of 31,160 at Stoke City's Victoria Ground. The home Third Round tie with Rotherham attracted a record of 8,536 people to Marston Road. After Chapman had departed to manage League club Stockport County, under his successor, Colin Meldrum, in 1975–76 Rangers came close to repeating the treble success of 1971–72. They were again at Wembley Stadium for their second FA Trophy Final but they lost to Scarborough 3–2 after extra time, finished as runners up in the Northern Premier League by one point and lost the Staffs Senior Cup final to Stoke City. At the end of that season Rangers competed in the Anglo Italian tournament against Serie C outfits Udinese and Monza who have since reached Serie A, winning 3–2 against the former at Marston Road and gaining a 1–1 draw away at Monza, the eventual winners. Meldrum was dismissed before the return fixtures in Italy and Rangers finished mid-table in 1976–77 before Roy Chapman returned as manager and success continued with a second FA Trophy Final win in 1979, this time against Kettering Town and qualification for the new Alliance Premier League.

Rangers thus became founder members of the Alliance Premier League but this coincided with the club finishing low in the league, as various managers found it difficult to follow the success of the 1970s. After four seasons Rangers were relegated to the Northern Premier League. This form continued, but with the appointment of Ron Reid as manager during the 1983–84 season as manager the club began to rebuild its reputation and won the 1984–85 League title. Back in the Alliance, the Bob Lord Trophy, Jim Thompson Shield and Staffordshire Senior Cup were all won within two seasons. During the late 1980s and early 1990s, Rangers struggled in the Conference, with six managers in seven seasons following Reid's departure in May 1988. Striker Stan Collymore was sold to Crystal Palace in December 1990 for a substantial six-figure fee. Under the management of Dennis Booth, Rangers enjoyed a successful 1992–93 campaign. In the league they finished 6th and reached the FA Cup second round, defeating Lincoln City in a First Round replay at Marston Road.

After Booth departed for Bristol Rovers, Rangers found success difficult to achieve and were relegated from the Conference to the Southern League Premier Division at the end of the 1994–95 season. The slide continued at the start of the 1995–96 campaign and when Kevan Bowen took over in October 1995 Rangers had not gained a point. Bowen achieved some positive results in the second half of the season but the damage had already been done at the start and the club was relegated for the second successive season. With an ambition to take Stafford Rangers back to their former heights in non-league football, the Board appointed Kevin Bond as manager towards the end of 1997. Rangers ended the season in a mid-table position and Bond moved on to Portsmouth.

Ian Painter succeeded Bond in the 1998 close season and in his first term Rangers finished 5th in the Southern League Midland Division with the distinction of being the equal highest scorers in the pyramid with 92 goals. In 1999–2000, following a slow start, a strengthened side achieved a club record unbeaten run of 23 league games. Rangers were once again equal highest scorers in the pyramid with 107 goals and duly won the Southern League Western Division championship.

=== 21st century ===
After two seasons in the Premier Division, finishing seventh and ninth respectively, Painter left the club in April 2002. During Painter's final season, Rangers recorded a club-record 15–0 victory over Kidsgrove Athletic in a Staffordshire Senior Cup tie on 20 November 2001. Kidsgrove Athletic later went on to lose again to Rangers 11-0 the following season.

Phil Robinson, whose playing career took him to several top Football League clubs around the East and West Midlands, joined his hometown club as player-manager in the 2002 close season and immediately set about creating a structure to develop young local talent with the introduction of reserve and youth teams. He retained only a few of Painter's squad which led to increased support on the terraces due to improved results. They finished second in the Southern League Premier Division, reached the FA Cup first round for the first time in a decade and brought the Staffordshire Senior Cup back to Marston Road with a 5–1 victory over Stoke City at Port Vale's Vale Park. Robinson's second season in charge, 2003–04, brought more success with Rangers this time finishing third in the league behind Crawley Town and Weymouth to earn a place amongst the Nationwide Conference North founder members. Rangers reached the Staffordshire Senior Cup Final but lost 1–0 to Kidsgrove Athletic. At the end of the 2004–05 season, Rangers regained the Senior Cup, defeating Leek Town in the Final at Vale Park. As well as reaching the FA Cup first round, where they lost to Chester City, Rangers finished the inaugural Conference North season in 8th position.

Stafford Rangers achieved promotion back to the fifth tier of English football after a play-off win on penalties over Droylsden in May 2006 at rivals Burton Albion's new Pirelli Stadium. This came at the end of a successful 2005–06 league campaign which resulted in a second-place finish.

In the 2006–07 season the club reached the second round of the FA Cup where they lost to Brighton & Hove Albion. A match against Dagenham & Redbridge was featured live on Sky Sports. Goalkeeper Danny Alcock was selected for the England Non-League squad in January 2007 and a month later Cameroonian Guy Madjo was selected by his nation for international duty. The club managed to avoid relegation on the final day of the season, and finished 20th in the Conference.

2007 saw Stafford struggle to compete in an increasingly difficult league with many ex-league and professional sides. Phil Robinson left the club after 5 1/2 years in charge. Neil Grayson and Kevin Street were placed in temporary charge of the club as joint caretaker managers.

On 21 February 2008, Steve Bull was appointed as head coach. Bull was unable to save the club and on 7 April 2008, Rangers were relegated to the Conference North following a 4–0 defeat at home to York City. He left the club on 12 December, being replaced by Chris Brindley, who was assistant manager under Bull. At the end of the 2009 season, Stafford Rangers' future was uncertain as they needed to pay Slick Seating £50,000 by 7 July. The club came up with the idea of selling 250 tickets at £200, that would be repaid in weekly draws. Consequently, the club was saved from going into administration.

On 14 April 2010, news was leaked that chairman Jon Downing had resigned from his position, after 17 years on the club's board. In September 2010, Brindley resigned as manager of Stafford Rangers. The following month, the club appointed Tim Flowers as manager, but he resigned as manager on 11 January 2011 after just nine games in charge and his assistant Matt Elliott took over the job. Despite some improved performances, Elliott could not prevent relegation to the Northern Premier League for the 2011–12 season. Their fate was not confirmed until the final game of the season, a 3–2 defeat at Stalybridge Celtic. Elliott resigned as manager.

On 31 May 2011, Greg Clowes was appointed manager, but on 8 September 2013, following defeat in all of their opening seven league games, Clowes, Garner and coach Mick Hathaway were relieved of their management duties. The club appointed Andy Mutch as interim manager until Graham Heathcote was announced as manager on 3 January 2014. Following a further relegation, this time to the NPL Division One South, Heathcote felt he could not continue as manager on a limited playing budget, and on 28 May 2014 former Rushall Olympic boss Neil Kitching was appointed as the new manager of Stafford Rangers. At the end of the 2015–16 season, the club were promoted back to the NPL Premier Division, finishing as champions of the NPL Division 1 South with 95 points.

At the end of the 2017–18 season Neil Kitching and his coaching team parted company with the club by mutual consent after four successful years at the helm. It was announced at the start of the 2018–19 season that former Stafford Rangers player Steve Burr would be taking over and he was appointed the club's new Manager. On 28 December 2018, Steve Burr resigned from his position as manager following poor results.

On 1 January 2019, Alex Meechan and Andy Fearn stepped up from Assistant Manager and First Team Coach to take charge of the first team as joint managers until the end of the season. After guiding the club away from the drop zone, thus avoiding relegation the Board of Directors gave the managerial duo the job on a permanent basis.

The 2020–21 season saw another managerial change with Jody Banim taking the helm. Matt Hill took the post of Assistant. Andy Fearn, who had been joint manager, joined the Board of Directors as Director of Football. At the end of the year Matt Hill took charge, until he left the club in November 2023.

The 2023–24 season saw a managerial change as Matt Hill was replaced as manager by Dave Cooke in November 2023. Cooke was unable to turn around his side's fortunes, the club suffering relegation on the penultimate weekend of the season.

In September 2024, Dave Cooke stepped down as manager and was succeeded by his assistant Dale Belford. In January 2025 Belford left the club by mutual consent following a poor run of results and was replaced by former Stafford Rangers manager Neil Kitching. John Bromley stepped down as chairman, but still remains a director and was succeeded by John Hayne who was co-chairman before taking over from Bromley as chairman.

Kitching departed as Manager in early 2026, and was replaced by Graham Deakin who was the Assistant Manager during Kitching's leadership.

== Stadium ==
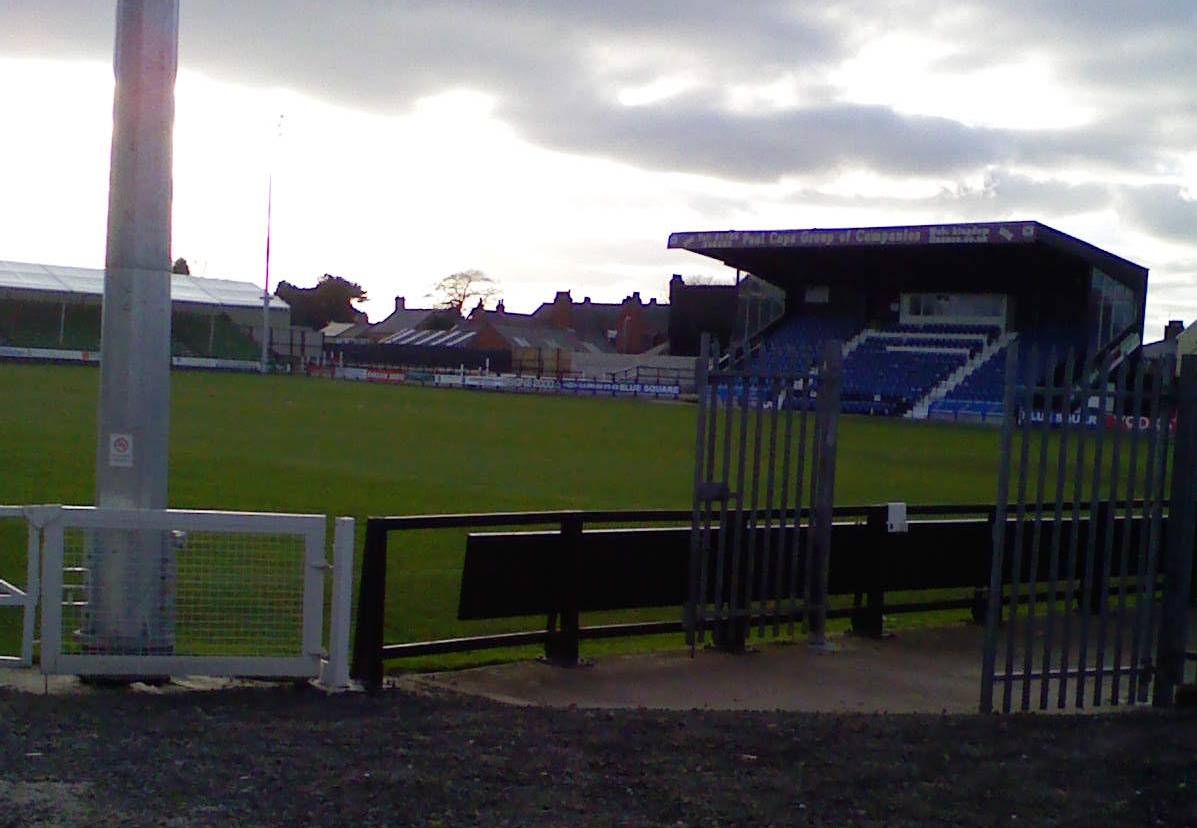
The Stan Robinson Stadium

In the 2006–07 season Rangers had an average attendance of over 1000.

On 14 December 2018 the new Shed End, a covered terrace at the far side of the ground, was completed and opened in a league game against local rivals Hednesford Town, with the Boro winning the game 4–1. The Shed End was a fan led project. Fans are now raising money for a cantilever stand at the Social Club End. Following its completion, the ground will have cover on all sides.

Prior to the 2019–20 season a group of fans renovated two unused rooms at the football ground to create a new Fans Bar. The Fans Bar is open to home and away fans on match days.

During November 2019 the club had the away turnstiles refurbished, this also included new exit gates and new fencing being erected, the club's car park situated at the front of the ground was fully tarmacked, replacing a rubble surface.

As of August 2023, Marston Road has been renamed The Stan Robinson Stadium, due to a new sponsorship deal with the haulage company of the same name. This is due to the loyalty and support Stan Robinson showed over many years

== Squad ==
As of 18th May 2026

Note: Flags indicate national team as defined under FIFA eligibility rules; some limited exceptions apply. Players may hold more than one non-FIFA nationality.

No.	Pos.	Nation	Player
—	GK	ENG	Russell Saunders
—	GK	ENG	Leon Phillips
—	DF	IRL	Andy Burns
—	DF	FRA	Anis Zaknoune
—	DF	ENG	Dylan Baily
—	DF	ENG	Harvey Washington
—	DF	POR	Beto Gomes
—	DF	ENG	Joe Dunne
—	DF	ENG	Mitch Clarke

No.	Pos.	Nation	Player
—	MF	ENG	Tom Tonks
—	MF	ENG	Ashley Fallon
—	MF	ENG	Joe Thompson
—	MF	ENG	Jack Birch
—	MF	ENG	Joe Thomas
—	FW	ENG	Kyle Sambor
—	FW	ENG	Scott Bakkor
—	FW	ENG	Ty Webster

== Notable players ==
See Stafford Rangers F.C. Players

== Management ==
The current manager of the club is Graham Deakin who has been in charge since 2026.

Deakin was previously the Assistant Manager of the club, under the leadership of Neil Kitching.

Following Kitchin's departure from the club, Deakin was promoted to Manager in early 2026.

== Post-war managers ==
See Stafford Rangers F.C. Managers

Dates	Name	Notes
February 1947 – May 1947	George Austin	
August 1947 – May 1948	Jack Dowen	
May 1948 – May 1950	(England) Billy Frith	
August 1950 – May 1951	Charlie Evans	
August 1952 – November 1953	Eric Hampson	
February 1955 – November 1955	(England) Frank Brown	
September 1957 – May 1958	(England) George Antonio	
August 1958 – May 1959	Len Millard	
August 1959 – September 1960	Bert Mitchell	
January 1961 – October 1963	Graham Cordell	
February 1964 – May 1964	(England) Ken Griffiths	
August 1964 – May 1965	(England) Stan Smith	
August 1965 – May 1969	(England) Colin Hutchinson	
August 1969 – September 1975	(England) Roy Chapman	1971/72 'Treble' 1974/75 FA Cup fourth round
September 1975	Ken Jones	
September 1975 – May 1976	(Scotland) Colin Meldrum	1975/76 FA Trophy Finalist
??? – ???	Reg Berks	
1977 – February 1980	(England) Roy Chapman	
May 1980 – October 1981	(England) Paul Ogden	
October 1981 – January 1983	(England) Bobby Thomson	
January 1983 – September 1983	(England) Colin Clarke	
September 1983 – May 1988	Ron Reid	
July 1988 – February 1989	Bryan Chambers	
February 1989 – November 1989	Ron Reid	
November 1989 – May 1990	John Williams	
June 1990 – January 1992	Chris Wright	
January 1992 – 1993	(England) Dennis Booth	
??? – ???	Brendan Phillips	
??? – June 1995	(England) Mark Harrison	
August 1995 – ???	Bob Horton	
??? – ???	Kevan Bowen	
October 1997 – May 1998	(England) Kevin Bond	
August 1998 – May 2002	(England) Ian Painter	1999–2000 Southern League Western Division
June 2002 – November 2007	(England) Phil Robinson	Promotion to Conference National
November 2007 – March 2008	(England) Neil Grayson (England) Kevin Street (Joint)	
March 2008 – December 2008	(England) Steve Bull	
December 2008 – September 2010	(England) Chris Brindley	
October 2010 – January 2011	(England) Tim Flowers	
January 2011 – May 2011	(Scotland) Matt Elliott	
July 2011 – September 2013	(England) Greg Clowes	
September 2013 – January 2014	(England) Andy Mutch	
January 2014 – May 2014	(England) Graham Heathcote	
May 2014 – May 2018	(England) Neil Kitching	First promotion since May 2006 by winning the Northern Premier League Division One South (2015 / 2016)
May 2018 – December 2018	(Scotland) Steve Burr	
January 2019 – April 2020	(England) Alex Meechan & (England) Andy Fearn (Joint)	
May 2020 – November 2020	(England) Jody Banim	
November 2020 – November 2023	(England) Matt Hill	
November 2023 – September 2024	(England) Dave Cooke	
September 2024 – January 2025	(England) Dale Belford	
January 2025 - 2026	(England) Neil Kitching	
2026–Present	Graham Deakin	

== Honours ==
=== League champions ===
- Northern Premier League Division One South:(1) 2015–16
- Birmingham Combination:(1) 1912–13
- Birmingham League:(1) 1926–27
- Northern Premier League:(2)1971–72, 1984–85
- Southern Football League Western Division :(1)1999–2000

=== League runners-up ===
- Birmingham League 1928–29, 1929–30
- Birmingham Wartime League 1939–40
- Cheshire County League 1968–69
- Northern Premier League 1970–71, 1975–76
- Southern League Premier Division 2002–03
- Conference North 2005–06

=== Cup winners ===
- FA Trophy:(2) 1971–72, 1978–79
- Staffordshire Senior Cup:(13) 1954–55, 1956–57, 1962–63, 1971–72, 1977–78, 1986–87, 1991–92, 2002–03, 2004–05, 2014–15, 2017–18, 2018–19, 2021–22
- Conference League Cup:(1) 1985–86
- Northern Premier League Shield :(1) 1985–86
- Walsall Senior Cup:(1) 2013–14

== Statistics ==
Record Win	15–0 v Kidsgrove Athletic 20 November 2001
Record Defeat	0–12 v Burton Town, 13 December 1930
Most goals in a game	7 – Les Box v Dudley Town, FA Cup 6 September 1958
Best FA Cup run	4th round 1974–75
Record FA Cup Win	11–0 v Dudley Town 6 September 1958

== See also ==
- Stafford Town F.C.
