= 2005–06 Football League =

107th season of the Football League

The Football League
- Season: 2005–06
- Champions: Reading
- Promoted: Reading; Sheffield United; Watford
- Relegated: Oxford United; Rushden & Diamonds
- New Clubs in League: Barnet; Carlisle United

The 2005–06 Football League (known as the Coca-Cola Football League for sponsorship reasons) was the 107th completed season of The Football League.

This season saw Reading promoted to the top flight for the first time in their history, after winning the Championship with 106 points – a record for a 46-match season with three points for a win. Southend United were the champions of League One, while Carlisle United, having played in the Conference in 2004–05, completed a double promotion by winning League Two.

== Promotion and Relegation ==
These are the changes that happened last season.

=== From Premier League ===
Relegated to Championship

- Norwich City
- Crystal Palace
- Southampton

=== From Championship ===
Promoted to Premier League

- Sunderland
- Wigan Athletic
- West Ham United

Relegated to League 1

- Gillingham
- Nottingham Forest
- Rotherham United

=== From Football League One ===
Promoted to Championship

- Luton Town
- Hull City
- Sheffield Wednesday

Relegated to League 2

- Peterborough United
- Stockport County
- Torquay United
- Wrexham

=== From Football League Two ===
Promoted to League 1

- Yeovil Town
- Scunthorpe United
- Swansea City
- Southend United

Relegated to Conference National

- Cambridge United
- Kidderminster Harriers

=== From Conference National ===
Promoted to League 2

- Barnet
- Carlisle United

== Final league tables and results ==
The tables below are reproduced here in the exact form that they can be found at The Rec.Sport.Soccer Statistics Foundation website, with home and away statistics separated. Play-off results are from the same website.

== Championship ==
Football League Championship
- Season: 2005–06
- Champions: Reading (1st second tier title)
- Direct promotion to FA Premier League: Reading, Sheffield United
- Promoted to FA Premier League through play-offs: Watford
- Relegated: Brighton & Hove Albion, Crewe Alexandra, Millwall
- Matches: 552
- Goals: 1,341 (2.43 per match)
- Top goalscorer: Marlon King (Watford), 21

| Pos | Team | Pld | W | D | L | GF | GA | GD | Pts | Promotion, qualification or relegation |
|---|---|---|---|---|---|---|---|---|---|---|
| 1 | Reading (C, P) | 46 | 31 | 13 | 2 | 99 | 32 | +67 | 106 | Promotion to the FA Premier League |
| 2 | Sheffield United (P) | 46 | 26 | 12 | 8 | 76 | 46 | +30 | 90 | Promotion to the FA Premier League |
| 3 | Watford (O, P) | 46 | 22 | 15 | 9 | 77 | 53 | +24 | 81 | Qualification for Championship play-offs |
| 4 | Preston North End | 46 | 20 | 20 | 6 | 59 | 30 | +29 | 80 | Qualification for Championship play-offs |
| 5 | Leeds United | 46 | 21 | 15 | 10 | 57 | 38 | +19 | 78 | Qualification for Championship play-offs |
| 6 | Crystal Palace | 46 | 21 | 12 | 13 | 67 | 48 | +19 | 75 | Qualification for Championship play-offs |
| 7 | Wolverhampton Wanderers | 46 | 16 | 19 | 11 | 50 | 42 | +8 | 67 | |
| 8 | Coventry City | 46 | 16 | 15 | 15 | 62 | 65 | −3 | 63 | |
| 9 | Norwich City | 46 | 18 | 8 | 20 | 56 | 65 | −9 | 62 | |
| 10 | Luton Town | 46 | 17 | 10 | 19 | 66 | 67 | −1 | 61 | |
| 11 | Cardiff City | 46 | 16 | 12 | 18 | 58 | 59 | −1 | 60 | |
| 12 | Southampton | 46 | 13 | 19 | 14 | 49 | 50 | −1 | 58 | |
| 13 | Stoke City | 46 | 17 | 7 | 22 | 54 | 63 | −9 | 58 | |
| 14 | Plymouth Argyle | 46 | 13 | 17 | 16 | 39 | 46 | −7 | 56 | |
| 15 | Ipswich Town | 46 | 14 | 14 | 18 | 53 | 66 | −13 | 56 | |
| 16 | Leicester City | 46 | 13 | 15 | 18 | 51 | 59 | −8 | 54 | |
| 17 | Burnley | 46 | 14 | 12 | 20 | 46 | 54 | −8 | 54 | |
| 18 | Hull City | 46 | 12 | 16 | 18 | 49 | 55 | −6 | 52 | |
| 19 | Sheffield Wednesday | 46 | 13 | 13 | 20 | 39 | 52 | −13 | 52 | |
| 20 | Derby County | 46 | 10 | 20 | 16 | 53 | 67 | −14 | 50 | |
| 21 | Queens Park Rangers | 46 | 12 | 14 | 20 | 50 | 65 | −15 | 50 | |
| 22 | Crewe Alexandra (R) | 46 | 9 | 15 | 22 | 57 | 86 | −29 | 42 | Relegation to Football League One |
| 23 | Millwall (R) | 46 | 8 | 16 | 22 | 35 | 62 | −27 | 40 | Relegation to Football League One |
| 24 | Brighton & Hove Albion (R) | 46 | 7 | 17 | 22 | 39 | 71 | −32 | 38 | Relegation to Football League One |

Updated to match(es) played on 2 December 2011. Source: RSSSF
Rules for classification: 1) points; 2) goal difference; 3) number of goals scored.
(C) Champions; (O) Play-off winners; (P) Promoted; (R) Relegated
Locations of the 2005–06 Championship teams

=== Play-offs ===
Semi-finals; 1st leg – 5/6 May; 2nd leg – 8/9 May 2006
3rd | Watford | 3 | 0 | 3
6th | Crystal Palace | 0 | 0 | 0
4th | Preston North End | 1 | 0 | 1
5th | Leeds United | 1 | 2 | 3

Final at Millennium Stadium, Cardiff; 21 May 2006
3rd | Watford | 3
5th | Leeds United | 0

=== Top scorers ===
| Rank | Player | Club | Goals |
|---|---|---|---|
| 1 | (Jamaica) Marlon King | Watford | 21 |
| 2 | (England) Dave Kitson | Reading | 18 |
| = | (Republic of Ireland) Kevin Doyle | Reading | 18 |
| = | (England) Cameron Jerome | Cardiff City | 18 |
| 5 | (England) Darius Henderson | Watford | 15 |
| = | (England) Andrew Johnson | Crystal Palace | 15 |
| = | (England) Gary McSheffrey | Coventry | 15 |
| = | (Nigeria) Ade Akinbiyi | Sheffield United | 15 |
| 9 | (England) Ashley Young | Watford | 14 |
| = | (Scotland) Steve Howard | Luton Town | 14 |

== League One ==
League One
- Season: 2005–06
- Champions: Southend United
- Promoted: Southend United; Colchester United; Barnsley
- Relegated: Hartlepool United; Milton Keynes Dons; Swindon Town; Walsall
- Matches: 552
- Goals: 1,384 (2.51 per match)
- Top goalscorer: Billy Sharp; Freddy Eastwood (23 goals each)

| Pos | Team | Pld | W | D | L | GF | GA | GD | Pts | Qualification or relegation |
|---|---|---|---|---|---|---|---|---|---|---|
| 1 | Southend United (C, P) | 46 | 23 | 13 | 10 | 72 | 43 | +29 | 82 | Promotion to the Championship |
| 2 | Colchester United (P) | 46 | 22 | 13 | 11 | 58 | 40 | +18 | 79 | Promotion to the Championship |
| 3 | Brentford | 46 | 20 | 16 | 10 | 72 | 52 | +20 | 76 | Qualification for the League One play-offs |
| 4 | Huddersfield Town | 46 | 19 | 16 | 11 | 72 | 59 | +13 | 73 | Qualification for the League One play-offs |
| 5 | Barnsley (O, P) | 46 | 18 | 18 | 10 | 62 | 44 | +18 | 72 | Qualification for the League One play-offs |
| 6 | Swansea City | 46 | 18 | 17 | 11 | 78 | 55 | +23 | 71 | Qualification for the League One play-offs |
| 7 | Nottingham Forest | 46 | 19 | 12 | 15 | 67 | 52 | +15 | 69 | |
| 8 | Doncaster Rovers | 46 | 20 | 9 | 17 | 55 | 51 | +4 | 69 | |
| 9 | Bristol City | 46 | 18 | 11 | 17 | 66 | 62 | +4 | 65 | |
| 10 | Oldham Athletic | 46 | 18 | 11 | 17 | 58 | 60 | −2 | 65 | |
| 11 | Bradford City | 46 | 14 | 19 | 13 | 51 | 49 | +2 | 61 | |
| 12 | Scunthorpe United | 46 | 15 | 15 | 16 | 68 | 73 | −5 | 60 | |
| 13 | Port Vale | 46 | 16 | 12 | 18 | 49 | 54 | −5 | 60 | |
| 14 | Gillingham | 46 | 16 | 12 | 18 | 50 | 64 | −14 | 60 | |
| 15 | Yeovil Town | 46 | 15 | 11 | 20 | 54 | 62 | −8 | 56 | |
| 16 | Chesterfield | 46 | 14 | 14 | 18 | 63 | 73 | −10 | 56 | |
| 17 | Bournemouth | 46 | 12 | 19 | 15 | 49 | 53 | −4 | 55 | |
| 18 | Tranmere Rovers | 46 | 13 | 15 | 18 | 50 | 52 | −2 | 54 | |
| 19 | Blackpool | 46 | 12 | 17 | 17 | 56 | 64 | −8 | 53 | |
| 20 | Rotherham United | 46 | 12 | 16 | 18 | 52 | 62 | −10 | 52 | |
| 21 | Hartlepool United (R) | 46 | 11 | 17 | 18 | 44 | 59 | −15 | 50 | Relegation to League Two |
| 22 | Milton Keynes Dons (R) | 46 | 12 | 14 | 20 | 45 | 66 | −21 | 50 | Relegation to League Two |
| 23 | Swindon Town (R) | 46 | 11 | 15 | 20 | 46 | 65 | −19 | 48 | Relegation to League Two |
| 24 | Walsall (R) | 46 | 11 | 14 | 21 | 47 | 70 | −23 | 47 | Relegation to League Two |

Rules for classification: 1) Points; 2) Goal difference; 3) Goals scored
(C) Champions; (O) Play-off winners; (P) Promoted; (R) Relegated
Locations of the 2005–06 League One teams

=== Play-offs ===
Semi-finals; 1st leg − 13 May; 2nd leg − 17 May 2006
3rd | Brentford | 1 | 0 | 1
6th | Swansea City | 1 | 2 | 3
4th | Huddersfield Town | 1 | 1 | 2
5th | Barnsley | 0 | 3 | 3

Final at Millennium Stadium, Cardiff; 28 May 2006
5th | Barnsley (pens.) | 2 (4)
6th | Swansea City | 2 (3)

=== Top scorers ===
| Rank | Player | Club | Goals |
|---|---|---|---|
| 1 | (England) Billy Sharp | Scunthorpe United | 23 |
| = | (Wales) Freddy Eastwood | Southend United | 23 |
| 3 | (England) James Hayter | AFC Bournemouth | 20 |
| = | (England) Lee Trundle | Swansea City | 20 |
| 5 | (England) Luke Beckett | Oldham Athletic | 18 |
| 6 | (New Zealand) Rory Fallon | Swansea City | 17 |
| = | (England) Izale McLeod | Milton Keynes Dons | 17 |
| = | (Scotland) Chris Iwelumo | Colchester United | 17 |
| 9 | (England) Dean Windass | Bradford City | 16 |
| = | (England) Steve Brooker | Bristol City | 16 |
| = | (England) Chris Greenacre | Tranmere Rovers | 16 |

== League Two ==
Football League Two
- Season: 2005–06
- Champions: Carlisle United (2nd fourth tier title)
- Direct promotion: Carlisle United, Leyton Orient, Northampton Town
- Promoted through play-offs: Cheltenham Town
- Relegated to Conference: Oxford United, Rushden & Diamonds
- New clubs in the league: Barnet, Carlisle United
- Matches: 552
- Goals: 1,392 (2.52 per match)
- Top goalscorer: Karl Hawley (Carlisle United), 22; Rickie Lambert (Rochdale), 22

| Pos | Team | Pld | W | D | L | GF | GA | GD | Pts | Promotion, qualification or relegation |
|---|---|---|---|---|---|---|---|---|---|---|
| 1 | Carlisle United (C, P) | 46 | 25 | 11 | 10 | 84 | 42 | +42 | 86 | Promotion to Football League One |
| 2 | Northampton Town (P) | 46 | 22 | 17 | 7 | 63 | 37 | +26 | 83 | Promotion to Football League One |
| 3 | Leyton Orient (P) | 46 | 22 | 15 | 9 | 67 | 51 | +16 | 81 | Promotion to Football League One |
| 4 | Grimsby Town | 46 | 22 | 12 | 12 | 64 | 44 | +20 | 78 | Qualification for League Two play-offs |
| 5 | Cheltenham Town (O, P) | 46 | 19 | 15 | 12 | 65 | 53 | +12 | 72 | Qualification for League Two play-offs |
| 6 | Wycombe Wanderers | 46 | 18 | 17 | 11 | 72 | 56 | +16 | 71 | Qualification for League Two play-offs |
| 7 | Lincoln City | 46 | 15 | 21 | 10 | 65 | 53 | +12 | 66 | Qualification for League Two play-offs |
| 8 | Darlington | 46 | 16 | 15 | 15 | 58 | 52 | +6 | 63 | |
| 9 | Peterborough United | 46 | 17 | 11 | 18 | 57 | 49 | +8 | 62 | |
| 10 | Shrewsbury Town | 46 | 16 | 13 | 17 | 55 | 55 | 0 | 61 | |
| 11 | Boston United | 46 | 15 | 16 | 15 | 50 | 60 | −10 | 61 | |
| 12 | Bristol Rovers | 46 | 17 | 9 | 20 | 59 | 67 | −8 | 60 | |
| 13 | Wrexham | 46 | 15 | 14 | 17 | 61 | 54 | +7 | 59 | |
| 14 | Rochdale | 46 | 14 | 14 | 18 | 66 | 69 | −3 | 56 | |
| 15 | Chester City | 46 | 14 | 12 | 20 | 53 | 59 | −6 | 54 | |
| 16 | Mansfield Town | 46 | 13 | 15 | 18 | 59 | 66 | −7 | 54 | |
| 17 | Macclesfield Town | 46 | 12 | 18 | 16 | 60 | 71 | −11 | 54 | |
| 18 | Barnet | 46 | 12 | 18 | 16 | 44 | 57 | −13 | 54 | |
| 19 | Bury | 46 | 12 | 17 | 17 | 45 | 57 | −12 | 52 (Note: Bury deducted one point for fielding an ineligible player.) | |
| 20 | Torquay United | 46 | 13 | 13 | 20 | 53 | 66 | −13 | 52 | |
| 21 | Notts County | 46 | 12 | 16 | 18 | 48 | 63 | −15 | 52 | |
| 22 | Stockport County | 46 | 11 | 19 | 16 | 57 | 78 | −21 | 52 | |
| 23 | Oxford United (R) | 46 | 11 | 16 | 19 | 43 | 57 | −14 | 49 | Relegation to Football Conference |
| 24 | Rushden & Diamonds (R) | 46 | 11 | 12 | 23 | 44 | 76 | −32 | 45 | Relegation to Football Conference |

Rules for classification: In the Football League goals scored (GF) takes precedence over goal difference (GD).
(C) Champions; (O) Play-off winners; (P) Promoted; (R) Relegated
Notes:
Locations of the 2005–06 League Two teams

=== Play-offs ===
Semi-finals; 1st leg − 13 May; 2nd leg – 16/18 May 2006
4th | Grimsby Town | 1 | 2 | 3
7th | Lincoln City | 0 | 1 | 1
5th | Cheltenham Town | 2 | 0 | 2
6th | Wycombe Wanderers | 1 | 0 | 1

Final at Millennium Stadium, Cardiff; 28 May 2006
4th | Grimsby Town | 0
5th | Cheltenham Town | 1

=== Top scorers ===
| Rank | Player | Club | Goals |
|---|---|---|---|
| 1 | (England) Rickie Lambert | Rochdale | 22 |
| = | (England) Karl Hawley | Carlisle United | 22 |
| 3 | (England) Richard Walker | Bristol Rovers | 20 |
| 4 | (England) Tommy Mooney | Wycombe Wanderers | 18 |
| = | (England) Richard Barker | Mansfield Town | 18 |
| 6 | (England) Scott McGleish | Northampton Town | 17 |
| 7 | (Ghana) Junior Agogo | Bristol Rovers | 16 |
| 8 | (England) Danny Crow | Peterborough United | 15 |
| = | (England) Gary Jones | Grimsby Town | 15 |
| = | (England) Michael Bridges | Carlisle United | 15 |

== See also ==
- English Football League
- 2005–06 in English football
- 2005 in association football
- 2006 in association football
