= 2005–06 Carlisle United F.C. season =

Carlisle United F.C.
2005–06 season
- Chairman: Andrew Jenkins
- Manager: Paul Simpson
- League Two: 1st (promoted)
- FA Cup: First round
- League Cup: First round
- Football League Trophy: Runners-up

For the 2005–06 season, Carlisle United Football Club competed in Football League Two.

== Results and fixtures ==
=== English League Two ===
==== League table ====
Pos	Team	Pld	W	D	L	GF	GA	GD	Pts	Promotion, qualification or relegation
1	Carlisle United (C, P)	46	25	11	10	84	42	+42	86	Promotion to Football League One
2	Northampton Town (P)	46	22	17	7	63	37	+26	83	Promotion to Football League One
3	Leyton Orient (P)	46	22	15	9	67	51	+16	81	Promotion to Football League One
4	Grimsby Town	46	22	12	12	64	44	+20	78	Qualification for League Two play-offs
5	Cheltenham Town (O, P)	46	19	15	12	65	53	+12	72	Qualification for League Two play-offs

Rules for classification: In the Football League goals scored (GF) takes precedence over goal difference (GD).
(C) Champions; (O) Play-off winners; (P) Promoted

==== Matches ====
Match Day	Date	Opponent	H/A	Score	Carlisle United Scorer(s)	League Position	Attendance	Report
1	6 August	Wycombe Wanderers	A	1–1				
2	9 August	Peterborough United	H	1–0				
3	13 August	Barnet	H	1–3				
4	20 August	Wrexham	A	1–0				
5	27 August	Northampton Town	H	0–1				
6	29 August	Lincoln City	A	0–0				
7	2 September	Bury	A	1–0				
8	10 September	Macclesfield Town	H	2–0				
9	17 September	Cheltenham Town	A	3–2				
10	24 September	Leyton Orient	H	2–3				
11	27 September	Chester City	A	0–2				
12	1 October	Bristol Rovers	H	1–3				
13	7 October	Oxford United	A	0–1				
14	15 October	Mansfield Town	H	1–0				
15	22 October	Notts County	A	0–0				
16	29 October	Stockport County	H	6–0				
17	12 November	Torquay United	A	4–3				
18	19 November	Oxford United	H	2–1				
19	26 November	Wycombe Wanderers	H	0–1				
20	6 December	Rushden & Diamonds	A	4–0				
21	10 December	Peterborough United	A	1–1				
22	17 December	Wrexham	H	2–1				
23	26 December	Darlington	H	1–1				
24	31 December	Brentford	H	2–1				
25	2 January	Grimsby Town	A	2–1				
26	7 January	Bury	H	4–0				
27	14 January	Shrewsbury Town	A	1–2				
28	18 January	Boston United	A	5–0				
29	21 January	Cheltenham Town	H	1–1				
30	29 January	Macclesfield Town	A	0–3				
31	4 February	Chester City	H	5–0				
32	11 February	Leyton Orient	A	0–0				
33	14 February	Shrewsbury Town	H	2–2				
34	18 February	Rushden & Diamonds	H	5–0				
35	25 February	Barnet	A	2–1				
36	10 March	Northampton Town	A	3–0				
37	18 March	Darlington	A	5–0				
38	25 March	Boston United	H	4–2				
39	28 March	Lincoln City	H	1–0				
40	8 April	Grimsby Town	H	1–0				
41	15 April	Bristol Rovers	A	1–1				
42	17 April	Notts County	H	2–1				
43	22 April	Mansfield Town	A	1–1				
44	29 April	Torquay United	H	1–2				
45	2 May	Rochdale	A	2–0				
46	6 May	Stockport County	A	0–0				

=== English League Cup ===
Round	Date	Opponent	H/A	Score	Carlisle United Scorer(s)	Attendance	Report
1	23 August	Burnley	A	1–2			

=== FA Cup ===
Round	Date	Opponent	H/A	Score	Carlisle United Scorer(s)	Attendance	Report
1	5 November	Cheltenham Town	A	0–1			

=== Football League Trophy ===
Round	Date	Opponent	H/A	Score	Carlisle United Scorer(s)	Attendance	Report
1	18 October	Oldham Athletic	A	1–1 (Carlisle won 6–5 on penalties)		2,226	
2	22 November	Blackpool	H	2–1		2,987	
QF	20 December	Tranmere Rovers	A	1–1 (Carlisle won 11–10 on penalties)		3,054	
SF	24 January	Kidderminster Harriers	H	1–0		4,432	
NS F L1	21 February	Macclesfield Town	H	2–1		5,706	
NS F L2	7 March	Macclesfield Town	A	2–3		3,598	
F	2 April	Swansea City	N	1–2		42,028	
