= 2006–07 Carlisle United F.C. season =

Carlisle United F.C.
2006–07 season
- Chairman: Andrew Jenkins
- Manager: Neil McDonald
- League One: 8th
- FA Cup: First round
- League Cup: Second round
- Football League Trophy: First round

For the 2006–07 season, Carlisle United F.C. competed in Football League One.

== Results & fixtures ==
=== English League One ===
==== League table ====
Pos	Team	Pld	W	D	L	GF	GA	GD	Pts	Promotion, qualification or relegation
6	Oldham Athletic	46	21	12	13	69	47	+22	75	Qualification for League One play-offs
7	Swansea City	46	20	12	14	69	53	+16	72	
8	Carlisle United	46	19	11	16	54	55	−1	68	
9	Tranmere Rovers	46	18	13	15	58	53	+5	67	
10	Millwall	46	19	9	18	59	62	−3	66	

Rules for classification: In the Football League goals scored (GF) takes precedence over goal difference (GD).

==== Matches ====
Match Day	Date	Opponent	H/A	Score	Carlisle United Scorer(s)	League Position	Attendance	Report
1	5 August	Doncaster Rovers	H	1–0				
2	9 August	Chesterfield	A	0–0				
3	12 August	Yeovil Town	A	1–2				
4	19 August	Leyton Orient	H	3–1				
5	27 August	Oldham Athletic	A	0–0				
6	3 September	Cheltenham Town	H	2–0				
7	9 September	Northampton Town	H	1–1				
8	12 September	Bradford City	A	1–1				
9	16 September	Nottingham Forest	A	0–0				
10	23 September	Brighton & Hove Albion	H	3–1				
11	26 September	Blackpool	H	2–0				
12	30 September	Crewe Alexandra	A	1–5				
13	7 October	Millwall	H	1–2				
14	14 October	Huddersfield Town	H	1–2				
15	21 October	Tranmere Rovers	H	1–0				
16	28 October	Gillingham	A	0–2				
17	4 November	Rotherham United	H	1–1				
18	18 November	Bournemouth	A	1–0				
19	25 November	Port Vale	H	3–2				
20	5 December	Bristol City	A	0–1				
21	9 December	Scunthorpe United	H	0–2				
22	16 December	Swansea City	A	0–5				
23	23 December	Brentford	H	2–0				
24	26 December	Blackpool	A	1–2				
25	30 December	Brighton & Hove Albion	A	2–1				
26	1 January	Bradford City	H	1–0				
27	13 January	Northampton Town	A	2–3				
28	20 January	Crewe Alexandra	H	0–2				
29	27 January	Brentford	A	0–0				
30	31 January	Nottingham Forest	H	1–0				
31	3 February	Doncaster Rovers	A	2–1				
32	10 February	Yeovil Town	H	1–4				
33	17 February	Leyton Orient	A	1–1				
34	20 February	Chesterfield	H	0–0				
35	24 February	Cheltenham Town	A	1–0				
36	3 March	Oldham Athletic	H	1–1				
37	10 March	Millwall	A	0–2				
38	17 March	Huddersfield Town	H	1–1				
39	24 March	Gillingham	H	5–0				
40	30 March	Tranmere Rovers	A	2–0				
41	7 April	Port Vale	A	2–0				
42	9 April	Bournemouth	H	3–1				
43	14 April	Rotherham United	A	1–0				
44	21 April	Bristol City	H	1–3				
45	28 April	Swansea City	H	1–2				
46	5 May	Scunthorpe United	A	0–3				

=== English League Cup ===
Round	Date	Opponent	H/A	Score	Carlisle United Scorer(s)	Attendance	Report
1	22 August	Bradford City	H	1–1 (Carlisle won 4–3 on penalties)			
2	19 September	Charlton Athletic	A	0–1			

=== FA Cup ===
Round	Date	Opponent	H/A	Score	Carlisle United Scorer(s)	Attendance	Report
1	10 November	Swindon Town	A	1–3			

=== Football League Trophy ===
Round	Date	Opponent	H/A	Score	Carlisle United Scorer(s)	Attendance	Report
1	17 October	Accrington Stanley	A	1–1 (Accrington won 3–1 on penalties)		850	
