= 2006 Football League One play-off final =

Association football match

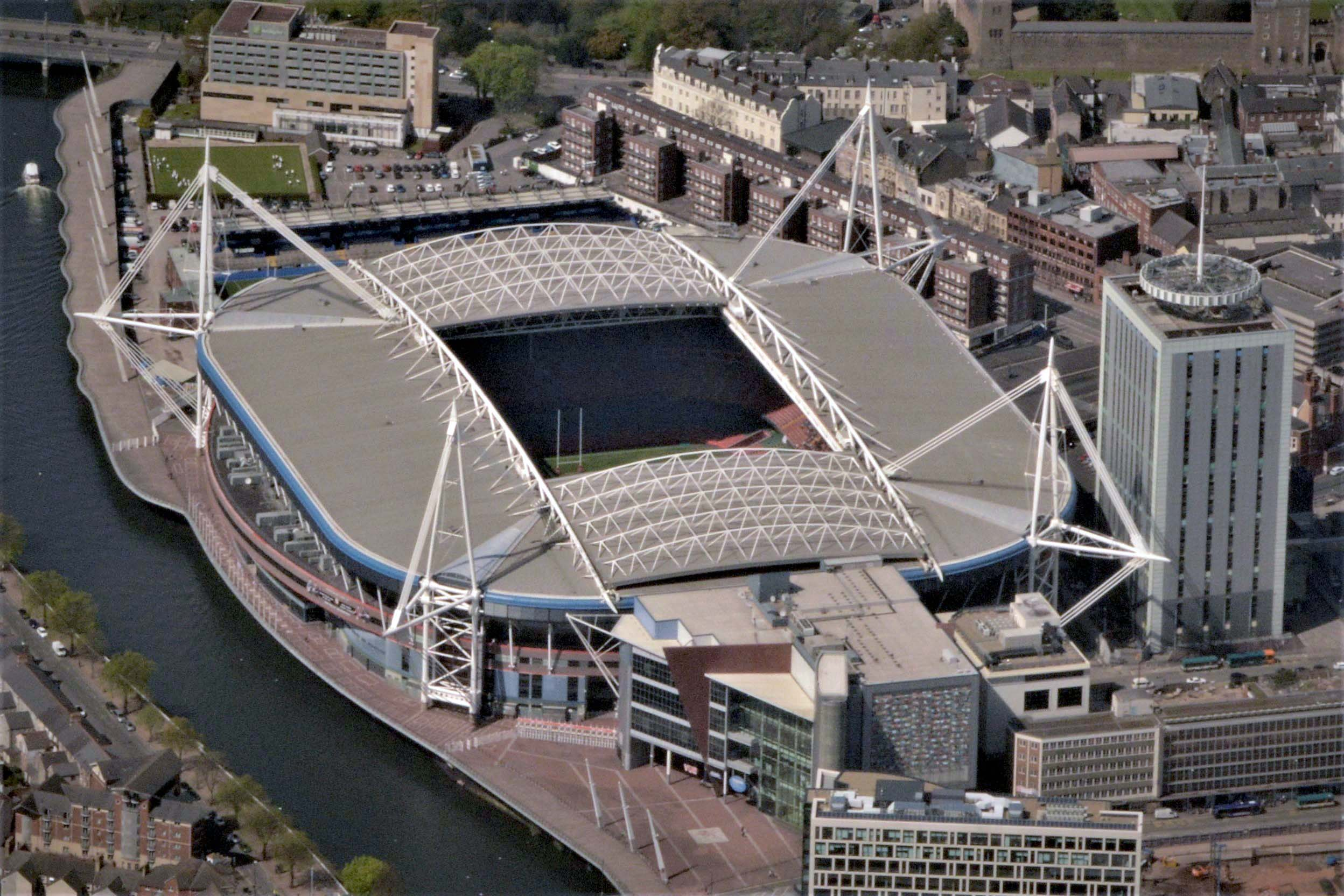
- The final took place at the Millennium Stadium.
| Barnsley | Swansea City |
| 2 | 2 |
- Barnsley won 4–3 on penalties
- Date: 27 May 2006
- Venue: Millennium Stadium, Cardiff
- Referee: Lee Mason (Lancashire)
- Attendance: 55,419

The 2006 Football League One play-off final was an association football match which was played on 27 May 2006 between Barnsley and Swansea City at the Millennium Stadium, Cardiff, to determine the third and final team to gain promotion from Football League One to the Football League Championship. The top two teams of the 2005–06 Football League One season, Southend United and Colchester United, gained automatic promotion to the Championship, while the teams placed from third to sixth in the table took part in play-off semi-finals. The winners of these semi-finals competed for the final place for the 2006–07 season in the Championship. The losing semi-finalists were Brentford and Huddersfield Town. It was the last League One play-off final to be played at the Millennium Stadium, while Wembley Stadium was being redeveloped.

The referee for the match, which was played in front of a crowd of 55,419, was Lee Mason. In the 20th minute, Martin Devaney's cross was headed by Kevin Austin and Paul Hayes volleyed the ball past Swansea goalkeeper Willy Guéret to make it 1–0. Nine minutes later, Swansea equalised when Rory Fallon scored with a bicycle kick. Andy Robinson then scored in the 41st minute after Barnsley goalkeeper Nick Colgan failed to hold his weak strike. On 62 minutes, Brian Howard was fouled on the edge of the Swansea penalty and Daniel Nardiello struck the resulting free kick into the Swansea goal to level the match at 2–2, where it remained at the end of regular time. No goals were scored in extra time, although both Lee Trundle and Adebayo Akinfenwa had chances for Swansea, and the game went to a penalty shootout. The first four penalties were scored, before Akinfenwa struck his spot-kick high over the crossbar. The next three penalties were scored before Colgan saved from Alan Tate, ensuring a 4–3 victory for Barnsley and promotion to the Championship.

Barnsley's next season, during which their manager Andy Ritchie was sacked, saw them finish in 20th position in the Championship, two places and eight points above the relegation zone. Swansea City finished their following season in seventh place in League One, one position below the play-offs.

== Route to the final ==
Football League One final table, leading positions
| Pos | Team | Pld | W | D | L | GF | GA | GD | Pts |
|---|---|---|---|---|---|---|---|---|---|
| 1 | Southend United | 46 | 23 | 13 | 10 | 72 | 43 | +29 | 82 |
| 2 | Colchester United | 46 | 22 | 13 | 11 | 58 | 40 | +18 | 79 |
| 3 | Brentford | 46 | 20 | 16 | 10 | 72 | 52 | +20 | 76 |
| 4 | Huddersfield Town | 46 | 19 | 16 | 11 | 72 | 59 | +13 | 73 |
| 5 | Barnsley | 46 | 18 | 18 | 10 | 62 | 44 | +18 | 72 |
| 6 | Swansea City | 46 | 18 | 17 | 11 | 78 | 55 | +23 | 71 |

Barnsley finished the regular 2005–06 season in fifth place in Football League One, the third tier of the English football league system, one place ahead of Swansea City. Both therefore missed out on the two automatic places for promotion to the Football League Championship and instead took part in the play-offs to determine the third promoted team. Barnsley finished seven points behind Colchester United (who were promoted in second place) and ten behind league winners Southend United. Swansea City ended the season one point behind Barnsley.

Swansea City faced Brentford in their play-off semi-final with the first match of the two-legged tie taking place at the Liberty Stadium in Swansea on 11 May 2006. Jay Tabb put Brentford ahead on 29 minutes when he converted a loose ball. Eight minutes into the second half, the visitors' goalkeeper Stuart Nelson was shown a red card for a professional foul. With three minutes of the match remaining, Sam Ricketts equalised for Swansea with a deflected shot to ensure the match ended 1–1. The second leg of the semi-final was contested three days later at Griffin Park in Brentford. Leon Knight opened the scoring for Swansea after eight minutes when he struck the ball over Nelson from around 20 yards (18 m). On 15 minutes, Knight doubled his tally and Swansea's lead, shooting past Nelson after receiving a through-ball from Leon Britton. The Swansea goalkeeper Willy Guéret made a number of saves in the second half and the match ended 2–0, with his side progressing to the final with a 3–1 aggregate victory.

Barnsley's opponents in their play-off semi-final were Huddersfield Town; the first leg took place at Oakwell in Barnsley on 11 May 2006. Martin Devaney's shot skimmed the Barnsley crossbar and Danny Schofield hit the post for Huddersfield. After a goalless first half, Huddersfield's Gary Taylor-Fletcher scored from close range in the 85th minute, and the game ended 1–0 to the visitors. The return leg was held four days later at the Galpharm Stadium in Huddersfield. The first half ended goalless but Paul Hayes put Barnsley ahead when he converted a penalty after being fouled in the penalty area by Schofield in the 58th minute. Jon Worthington equalised seven minutes later when the ball crossed the Barnsley goal-line after he charged down a Nick Colgan clearance. A header from Paul Reid in the 71st minute put Barnsley 2–1 ahead on the day and levelled the aggregate score at 2–2. In the 78th minute, the Huddersfield goalkeeper Paul Rachubka failed to gather Brian Howard's shot and Daniel Nardiello scored, to send Barnsley to the final with a 3–2 aggregate victory.

== Match ==
=== Background ===
This was Swansea City's fifth appearance in the play-offs and their third final, having won the 1988 Football League Fourth Division play-off final 5–4 on aggregate against Torquay United and losing 1–0 to Northampton Town in the 1997 Football League Third Division play-off final at the old Wembley Stadium. Swansea had played in League One for a single season having been promoted from League Two the previous season. They had also played at the Millennium Stadium earlier in the year where they defeated Carlisle United 2–1 in the Football League Trophy final. Barnsley were making their second play-off appearance, having lost in the 2000 Football League First Division play-off final 4–2 to Ipswich Town, and had played in League One since suffering relegation in the 2001–02 season. In the two matches between the sides during the regular season, Swansea won their home match 3–1 in August 2005 while the return fixture at Oakwell the following March ended in a 2–2 draw. Lee Trundle was Swansea City's top scorer during the regular season with 20 goals, all in the league, followed by Andy Robinson with 12 (all in the league). Barnsley's leading marksmen were Marc Richards with 12 (all in the league) and Hayes with 11 (6 in the league and 5 in the FA Cup).

The referee for the match was Lee Mason. The match was broadcast live in the UK on Sky Sports. It was the final time that the League One play-off final was played at the Millennium Stadium during the redevelopment of Wembley Stadium. Swansea had around 35,000 supporters at the Welsh stadium, compared to around 20,000 Barnsley fans. Both teams adopted a 4–4–2 formation, with both starting elevens remaining unchanged from their respective semi-final second-leg matches.

=== Summary ===
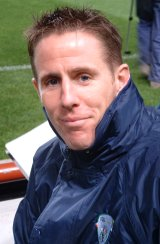
Nick Colgan saved a penalty during the shootout.

Barnsley kicked off the match around 3 p.m. on 27 May 2006 in front of a Millennium Stadium crowd of 55,419. Swansea started the stronger of the sides with Owain Tudur Jones taking a shot in the third minute which went wide before Nardiello's strike was also off target two minutes later. In the 10th minute, Howard's low shot was saved by Guéret in the Swansea goal before Reid scored to put Barnsley ahead in the 20th minute. Devaney's cross was headed by Kevin Austin and Reid volleyed the ball past Guéret to make it 1–0. Five minutes later, an offside Knight struck the Barnsley post with a shot and in the 29th minute, Swansea equalised: Tudur Jones flicked on a cross from Garry Monk and Fallon scored with a bicycle kick. Two minutes after scoring, Fallon cleared Stephen McPhail's effort off the Swansea goal-line. Robinson then scored in the 41st minute after Colgan failed to hold his weak strike. Just before the interval, both Howard and Bobby Hassell were shown the yellow card. The score was 2–1 to Swansea at half-time.

Neither side made any substitutions during the break and Swansea kicked off the second half. Three minutes in, Knight's shot cleared the Barnsley crossbar, and six minutes later, Guéret comfortably saved a strike from McPhail. On 62 minutes, Howard was fouled on the edge of the Swansea penalty area to win a free kick. Nardiello struck the set piece low, past a motionless Guéret, and into the Swansea goal to level the match at 2–2. Swansea made their first change in the 69th minute with Trundle coming on for Knight and soon after, Tommy Wright replaced Richards for Barnsley; Dale Tonge then replaced an injured Howard in the 73rd minute. With five minutes remaining, Reid's header at the far post went wide before Tudur Jones' shot was too high. In stoppage time, Alan Tate had only Colgan to beat but sliced his shot wide. Regular time ended 2–2, sending the match into extra time.

Two minutes into the first period of extra time, Trundle's long-range shot went wide. Swansea then made their second substitution of the game with Adebayo Akinfenwa coming on for Fallon. Almost immediately, Akinfenwa struck a shot just wide of the Barnsley goal. A minute later Chris Shuker came on to replace Nardiello. Swansea dominated extra time with opportunities for both Trundle and Akinfenwa but after a minute of stoppage time, the final whistle was blown and the game needed to be decided by a penalty shootout. The first four penalties were scored, before Akinfenwa struck his spot-kick high over the crossbar. Paul Heckingbottom scored to make it 3–2 before Tudur Jones levelled the shootout. Antony Kay then converted his penalty to put Barnsley ahead before Colgan saved from Tate, ensuring a 4–3 victory for Barnsley and promotion to the Championship.

=== Details ===
27 May 2006
15:00

| Barnsley | 2–2 (a.e.t.) | Swansea City |
|---|---|---|
| Hayes 19'; Nardiello 62' | Report | Fallon 28'; Robinson 40' |
Penalties
| Hayes (penalty scored); McPhail (penalty scored); Heckingbottom (penalty scored); Kay (penalty scored) | 4–3 | (penalty scored) Trundle; (penalty scored) Britton; (penalty missed) Akinfenwa; (penalty scored) Tudur Jones; (penalty missed) Tate |

Millennium Stadium, Cardiff
Attendance: 55,419
Referee: Lee Mason

| Barnsley | Swansea |

| GK | 1 | Nick Colgan |
| DF | 2 | Bobby Hassell | (yellow card) 45' |
| DF | 4 | Paul Reid |
| DF | 15 | Antony Kay |
| DF | 3 | Paul Heckingbottom |
| MF | 25 | Martin Devaney |
| MF | 11 | Brian Howard | (yellow card) 45' | (substituted off) 73' |
| MF | 10 | Stephen McPhail |
| FW | 8 | Paul Hayes |
| FW | 21 | Marc Richards | | (substituted off) 70' |
| FW | 23 | Daniel Nardiello | | (substituted off) 96' |
Substitutes:
| GK | 22 | Scott Flinders |
| DF | 14 | Neil Austin |
| MF | 18 | Chris Shuker | (substituted on) 96' |
| MF | 19 | Dale Tonge | (yellow card) 109' | (substituted on) 73' |
| FW | 29 | Tommy Wright | (substituted on) 70' |
Manager:
Andy Ritchie

| GK | 27 | Willy Guéret |
| DF | 2 | Sam Ricketts |
| DF | 3 | Kevin Austin |
| DF | 5 | Alan Tate |
| DF | 16 | Garry Monk |
| MF | 4 | Kristian O'Leary |
| MF | 7 | Leon Britton |
| MF | 23 | Owain Tudur Jones |
| MF | 18 | Andy Robinson | (substituted off) 105' |
| ST | 24 | Leon Knight | (substituted off) 69' |
| ST | 29 | Rory Fallon | (substituted off) 94' |
Substitutes:
| GK | 1 | Brian Murphy |
| DF | 15 | Tom Williams |
| MF | 14 | Kevin McLeod | (substituted on) 105' |
| FW | 9 | Adebayo Akinfenwa | (substituted on) 94' |
| FW | 10 | Lee Trundle | (substituted on) 69' |
Manager:
Kenny Jackett

== Post-match ==
Andy Ritchie, the winning manager, said "The players were absolutely magnificent and they deserve a great deal of credit ... We always felt that we could get a goal back when we were 2–1 down and at half-time we got them to focus." Colgan said of his error that he "wanted the roof to open up and take me up after my mistake. But that's the nature of goalkeeping, one minute you are the villain and the next you are a hero." Kenny Jackett, the Swansea manager, suggested his side's failure to take their chances was the reason for their defeat: "It's a bitter disappointment, particularly considering we had more chances and more of the play ... we had more than enough chances to win the game."

Barnsley's next season saw them finish in 20th position in the Championship, two places and eight points above the relegation zone. Ritchie was sacked in November 2006 with the club second from bottom of the Championship table. Swansea City finished their following season in seventh place in League One, one position below the play-offs.
