= 2006 Football League play-offs =

Football League play-offs
- Season: 2005–06
- Champions: Watford (Championship); Barnsley (League One); Cheltenham Town (League Two)
- Matches played: 15
- Goals scored: 31 (2.07 per match)
- Biggest home win: Grimsby 2–1 Lincoln (League Two)
- Biggest away win: Crystal Palace 0–3 Watford (Championship)
- Highest scoring: Hud'field 1–3 Barnsley; Barnsley 2–2 Swansea (4 goals)
- Highest attendance: 64,736 – Leeds v Watford (Championship final)
- Lowest attendance: 5,936 – Wycombe v Cheltenham (League Two semi-final)
- Average attendance: 22,720

The Football League play-offs for the 2005–06 season were held in May 2006, with the finals taking place at Millennium Stadium in Cardiff for the last time. The play-off semi-finals were played over two legs and were contested by the teams who finished in 3rd, 4th, 5th and 6th place in the Football League Championship and League One and the 4th, 5th, 6th and 7th placed teams in the League Two table. The winners of the semi-finals advanced to the finals, with the winners of these matches gaining promotion for the following season.

== Background ==
The Football League play-offs have been held every year since 1987. They take place for each division following the conclusion of the regular season and are contested by the four clubs finishing below the automatic promotion places.

In the Championship, Watford, who were aiming to return to the top flight for the first time since 2000, finished 9 points behind second placed Sheffield United, who in turn finished 16 points behind champions Reading, who were promoted to the top flight for the first time in the club's history. Preston North End who missed out on promotion from playoffs the season before and have not been in the top flight since 1961, finished in fourth place in the table. Leeds United who are aiming to bounce back to the Premier League at the second attempt, finished in fifth place. Crystal Palace finished 3 points behind Leeds United and were looking for a place back in the Premiership after relegation on final day of last season.

== Championship ==
Pos	Team	Pld	W	D	L	GF	GA	GD	Pts
3	Watford	46	22	15	9	77	53	+24	81
4	Preston North End	46	20	20	6	59	30	+29	80
5	Leeds United	46	21	15	11	57	38	+19	78
6	Crystal Palace	46	21	12	14	67	48	+19	75

=== Semi-finals ===
First leg

5 May 2006
19:45

Leeds United	1–1	Preston North End
Lewis 74'	Report	Nugent 48'

Elland Road, Leeds
Attendance: 35,239
Referee: Phil Crossley

6 May 2006
12:15

Crystal Palace	0–3	Watford
	Report	King 46'; Young 67'; Spring 85'

Selhurst Park, London
Attendance: 22,880
Referee: Mike Jones

Second leg

8 May 2006
19:45

Preston North End	0–2	Leeds United
	Report	Hulse 56'; Richardson 61'

Deepdale, Preston
Attendance: 20,383
Referee: Mike Thorpe

Leeds United win 3–1 on aggregate.

9 May 2006
19:45

Watford	0–0	Crystal Palace
	Report

Vicarage Road, Watford
Attendance: 19,041
Referee: Steve Tanner

Watford won 3–0 on aggregate.

=== Final ===
21 May 2006
15:00

Leeds United	0–3	Watford
	Report	DeMerit 25'; Sullivan 57' (o.g.); Henderson 84' (pen.)

Millennium Stadium, Cardiff
Attendance: 64,736
Referee: Mike Dean

== League One ==
Pos	Team	Pld	W	D	L	GF	GA	GD	Pts
3	Brentford	46	20	16	10	72	52	+20	76
4	Huddersfield Town	46	19	16	11	72	59	+13	73
5	Barnsley	46	18	18	10	62	44	+18	72
6	Swansea City	46	18	17	11	78	55	+23	71

=== Semi-finals ===
First leg

11 May 2006
19:45

Barnsley	0–1	Huddersfield Town
	Report	Taylor-Fletcher 85'

Oakwell, Barnsley
Attendance: 16,127
Referee: Paul Taylor

11 May 2006
19:45

Swansea City	1–1	Brentford
Ricketts 87'	Report	Tabb 29'

Liberty Stadium, Swansea
Attendance: 19,060
Referee: Keith Stroud

Second leg

14 May 2006
12:15

Brentford	0–2	Swansea City
	Report	Knight 8', 15'

Griffin Park, Brentford
Attendance: 10,652
Referee: Graham Laws

Swansea City won 3–1 on aggregate.

15 May 2006
19:45

Huddersfield Town	1–3	Barnsley
Heckingbottom 65' (o.g.)	Report	Hayes 58' (pen.); Reid 71'; Nardiello 78'

Galpharm Stadium, Huddersfield
Attendance: 19,223
Referee: Chris Foy

Barnsley won 3–2 on aggregate.

=== Final ===
27 May 2006
15:00

Barnsley	2–2 (a.e.t.)	Swansea City
Hayes 19'; Nardiello 62'	Report	Fallon 28'; Robinson 40'
Penalties
Hayes (penalty scored); McPhail (penalty scored); Heckingbottom (penalty scored); Kay (penalty scored)	4–3	(penalty scored) Trundle; (penalty scored) Britton; (penalty missed) Akinfenwa; (penalty scored) Tudur Jones; (penalty missed) Tate

Millennium Stadium, Cardiff
Attendance: 55,419
Referee: Lee Mason

== League Two ==
Pos	Team	Pld	W	D	L	GF	GA	GD	Pts
4	Grimsby Town	46	22	12	12	64	44	+20	78
5	Cheltenham Town	46	19	15	12	65	53	+12	72
6	Wycombe Wanderers	46	18	17	11	72	56	+16	71
7	Lincoln City	46	15	21	10	65	53	+12	66

=== Semi-finals ===
First leg

13 May 2006
12:05

Lincoln City	0–1	Grimsby Town
	Report	Jones 22'

Sincil Bank, Lincoln
Attendance: 8,037
Referee: Lee Mason

13 May 2006
18:05

Wycombe Wanderers	1–2	Cheltenham Town
Mooney 90'	Report	Finnigan 43'; Guinan 75'

Adams Park, High Wycombe
Attendance: 5,936
Referee: Andy Hall

Second leg

16 May 2006
19:45

Grimsby Town	2–1	Lincoln City
Futcher 60'; Jones 82'	Report	Robinson 27'

Blundell Park, Grimsby
Attendance: 8,062
Referee: Mike Dean

Grimsby Town won 3–1 on aggregate.

18 May 2006
19:45

Cheltenham Town	0–0	Wycombe Wanderers
	Report

Whaddon Road, Cheltenham
Attendance: 6,813
Referee: Nigel Miller

Cheltenham Town won 2–1 on aggregate.

=== Final ===
28 May 2006
15:00

Cheltenham Town	1–0	Grimsby Town
Guinan 63'	Report

Millennium Stadium, Cardiff
Attendance: 29,196
Referee: Paul Taylor
