= 2004–05 Swansea City A.F.C. season =

Swansea City
2004–05 season
- Chairman: Huw Jenkins
- Manager: Kenny Jackett
- Stadium: Vetch Field
- Football League Two: 3rd (promoted)
- FA Cup: Third round proper
- League Cup: First round
- Football League Trophy: Second round
- FAW Premier Cup: Winners
- Top goalscorer: League: Lee Trundle (22); All: Lee Trundle (23)
- Highest home attendance: 11,469 (30 April 2005 vs Shrewsbury Town, Football League Two)
- Lowest home attendance: 3,559 (28 September 2004 vs Luton Town, Football League Trophy)
- Average home league attendance: 8,457
Home colours

The 2004–05 season was Swansea City Association Football Club's 27th season in the newly formed Football League Two, and their 76th in English football. Alan Curtis had left the club early before the season's start, with Kenny Jackett replacing him. Swansea City gained promotion by finishing in third place. In the cup competitions, they reached the third round of the FA Cup, having defeated Cheltenham Town and Stockport County, before losing 2–1 on aggregate against Reading. A 3–0 loss against Queens Park Rangers saw Swansea exit in the first round of the League Cup. They were eliminated in the second round of the Football League Trophy, but reached the final in the FAW Premier Cup, beating Wrexham 2–1.

Lee Trundle was the club's top goalscorer with 23 goals in all competitions.

== Players ==
=== Squad information ===
N	Pos.	Nat.	Name	Age	EU	Since	App	Goals	Ends	Transfer fee	Notes
1	GK	(Republic of Ireland)	Brian Murphy	21	EU	2003	15	0		Free	
2	DF	(Wales)	Sam Ricketts	22	EU	2004	53	1		Free	
3	DF	(Trinidad and Tobago)	Kevin Austin	31	Non-EU	2004	50	0		Free	
4	DF	(Wales)	Kristian O'Leary	26	EU	1995	263	9		Youth system	
5	DF	(England)	Alan Tate	21	EU	2002	83	1		Free	
6	MF	(Spain)	Roberto Martínez	30	EU	2003	91	2		Free	
7	MF	(England)	Leon Britton	21	EU	2003	108	4		Free	
8	FW	(England)	Kevin Nugent	35	EU	2003	82	19		Free	
9	FW	(Wales)	James Thomas	25	EU	2002	66	17		Free	
10	FW	(England)	Lee Trundle	27	EU	2003	87	45		Free	
11	MF	(England)	Adrian Forbes	25	EU	2004	86	12		Free	
12	FW	(England)	Lee Thorpe	28	EU	2005	15	3		Loan	On loan from Bristol Rovers
14	MF	(England)	Brad Maylett	23	EU	2003	63	5		Free	On loan to Boston United
15	MF	(England)	Gary Fisken	22	EU	2004	7	0		Free	On loan to Cambridge United
16	DF	(England)	Garry Monk	25	EU	2004	41	0		Free	
17	FW	(England)	Paul Connor	25	EU	2004	58	18		£35,000	
18	MF	(England)	Andy Robinson	24	EU	2003	85	18		Free	
19	DF	(England)	Andy Gurney	24	EU	2004	33	1		Free	
19	FW	(England)	Dennis Oli	20	EU	2004	1	0		Free	
20	DF	(Wales)	Stuart Jones	25	EU	2002	38	0		Youth system	
21	DF	(England)	Ijah Anderson	28	EU	2004	21	0		Free	
22	DF	(England)	Izzy Iriekpen	22	EU	2003	71	3	2005	Free	
23	MF	(England)	Antonio Corbisiero	19	EU	2002	5	0		Youth system	
24	GK	(Wales)	Kyle Letheren	16	EU	2003	0	0		Youth system	
25	FW	(England)	Scott Fitzgerald	24	EU	2004	4	0	2004	Loan	On loan from Watford
25	FW	(Wales)	Mark Pritchard	18	EU	2003	4	0		Youth system	On loan to Merthyr Tydfil
26	FW	(Wales)	Chad Bond	17	EU	2003	0	0		Youth system	
27	GK	(France)	Willy Guéret	30	EU	2004	52	0		Undisclosed	
28	MF	(England)	Marc Goodfellow	22	EU	2004	8	4		Loan	On loan from Bristol City
29	MF	(England)	Kevin McLeod	23	EU	2005	11	0		Undisclosed	
30	MF	(England)	Marcus Bean	19	EU	2005	8	0	2005	Loan	On loan from Queens Park Rangers

- Source: Footballsquads and Soccerbase

=== Transfers ===
==== In ====
#	Position	Player	Transferred from	Fee	Date	Team	Source
17	FW	(England) Paul Connor	(England) Rochdale	£35,000	12 March 2004	First-team	
2	DF	(England) Sam Ricketts	(England) Telford United	Free transfer	27 May 2004	First-team	
16	DF	(England) Garry Monk	(England) Barnsley	Free transfer	4 June 2004	First-team	
3	DF	(Trinidad and Tobago) Kevin Austin	(England) Bristol Rovers	Free transfer	18 June 2004	First-team	
11	MF	(England) Adrian Forbes	(England) Luton Town	Free transfer	18 June 2004	First-team	
15	MF	(England) Gary Fisken	(England) Watford	Free transfer	22 June 2004	First-team	
27	GK	(France) Willy Guéret	(England) Millwall	Free transfer	1 July 2004	First-team	
19	FW	(England) Dennis Oli	(England) Farnborough Town	Free transfer	6 July 2004	First-team	
19	DF	(England) Andy Gurney	(England) Swindon Town	Free transfer	1 September 2004	First-team	
21	DF	(England) Ijah Anderson	(England) Bristol Rovers	Free transfer	25 November 2004	First-team	
29	MF	(England) Kevin McLeod	(England) Queens Park Rangers	Undisclosed	16 February 2005	First-team	
12	FW	(England) Lee Thorpe	(England) Bristol Rovers	Free transfer	16 February 2005	First-team	

==== Out ====
#	Position	Player	Transferred to	Fee	Date	Source
12	DF	(England) Leon Hylton	Free agent	Released	31 May 2004	
19	FW	(England) Dennis Oli	(England) Cambridge United	Free transfer	10 September 2004	
21	DF	(England) Jamie Rewbury	Free agent	Released	1 November 2004	
25	FW	(England) Scott Fitzgerald	(England) Brentford	Free transfer	24 March 2005	
30	MF	(England) Marcus Bean	(England) Blackpool	Undisclosed	24 January 2006	
28	MF	(England) Marc Goodfellow	(England) Grimsby Town	Free transfer	31 January 2006	

==== Out on loan ====
Squad #	Position	Player	Loaned to	Loan expires	Date	Source
25	FW	(England) Scott Fitzgerald	(England) Leyton Orient		14 January 2005	
25	FW	(England) Scott Fitzgerald	(England) Brentford		4 March 2005	
14	MF	(England) Brad Maylett	(England) Boston United		18 March 2005	

== Matches ==
=== League table ===
Pos	Team	Pld	W	D	L	GF	GA	GD	Pts	Promotion or relegation
1	Yeovil Town (C, P)	46	25	8	13	90	65	+25	83	Promotion to League One
2	Scunthorpe United (P)	46	22	14	10	69	42	+27	80	Promotion to League One
3	Swansea City (P)	46	24	8	14	62	43	+19	80	Promotion to League One
4	Southend United (O, P)	46	22	12	12	65	46	+19	78	Qualification for League Two play-offs
5	Macclesfield Town	46	22	9	15	60	49	+11	75	Qualification for League Two play-offs

Updated to match(es) played on 15 September 2009. Source: 2004–05 League Two
Rules for classification: 1) points; 2) goal difference; 3) number of goals scored.
(C) Champions; (O) Play-off winners; (P) Promoted

==== Results summary ====
Overall								Home						Away					
Pld	W	D	L	GF	GA	GD	Pts	W	D	L	GF	GA	GD	W	D	L	GF	GA	GD
46	24	8	14	62	43	+19	80	15	5	3	36	16	+20	9	3	11	26	27	−1

Last updated: 15 September 2009.
Source: 2004–05 League Two

==== Results by round ====
Round	1	2	3	4	5	6	7	8	9	10	11	12	13	14	15	16	17	18	19	20	21	22	23	24	25	26	27	28	29	30	31	32	33	34	35	36	37	38	39	40	41	42	43	44	45	46
Ground	H	A	A	H	A	H	A	H	A	H	A	H	A	H	A	H	H	A	H	A	A	H	A	H	H	A	H	A	H	H	A	A	H	A	H	A	H	A	H	A	H	A	H	A	H	A
Result	L	W	L	D	W	W	L	W	W	W	D	W	L	W	D	W	W	L	L	W	L	W	W	W	L	W	D	W	W	D	L	L	D	L	W	L	D	D	W	W	W	L	W	L	W	W
Position	22	10	19	18	13	7	10	8	5	3	2	1	2	1	3	2	1	2	2	2	3	3	3	3	3	3	3	3	2	2	3	3	3	4	4	5	5	5	5	4	3	4	3	4	4	3

Source: Football League Two
A = Away; H = Home; W = Win; D = Draw; L = Loss

== Club ==
=== Coaching staff ===
Position	Staff
Manager	(Wales) Kenny Jackett
Assistant manager	(England) Kevin Nugent

Source: Swansea City A.F.C.

=== Pre-season ===
17 July 2004 Friendly	Worcester City	1–3	Swansea City	Worcester
15:00 BST	Webster		Oli, Nugent	Stadium: St George's Lane; Attendance: 750

20 July 2004 Friendly	Barry Town	0–2	Swansea City	Barry
19:45 BST			Roberts; Thomas	Stadium: Jenner Park; Attendance: 1,000

24 July 2004 Friendly	Hereford United	0–0	Swansea City	Hereford
15:00 BST		Report		Stadium: Edgar Street; Attendance: 1,778

27 July 2004 Holland Tour	ADO Den Haag (Netherlands)	1–1	(Wales) Swansea City	The Hague
19:30 GMT			Jones	Stadium: Zuiderparkstadion; Referee: 1,000

29 July 2004 Holland Tour	Telstar (Netherlands)	1–1	(Wales) Swansea City	Velsen
19:30 GMT			Oli	Stadium: TATA Steel Stadion; Attendance: 1,500

31 July 2004 Holland Tour	Noordwijk (Netherlands)	1–4	(Wales) Swansea City	Noordwijk
17:00 GMT			Pritchard,, Maylett	Stadium: Sportpark Duinwetering; Attendance: 500

1 August 2004 Holland Tour	Haarlem (Netherlands)	2–1	(Wales) Swansea City	Haarlem
15:00 GMT			Robinson 58' (pen.)	Stadium: Haarlem Stadion; Attendance: 2,000

=== Football League Two ===
7 August 2004 1	Swansea City	0–2	Northampton Town	Swansea
15:00 BST			McGleish 3'; Ricketts 82' (o.g.)	Stadium: Vetch Field; Attendance: 9,578; Referee: Mick Fletcher

10 August 2004 2	Rochdale	0–2	Swansea City	Rochdale
19:45 BST			Nugent 21'; Robinson 61'	Stadium: Spotland; Attendance: 2,514; Referee: Andy Penn

14 August 2004 3	Macclesfield Town	1–0	Swansea City	Macclesfield
15:00 BST	Parkin 17'			Stadium: Moss Rose; Attendance: 2,164; Referee: Darren Drysdale

21 August 2004 4	Swansea City	1–1	Cheltenham Town	Swansea
15:00 BST	Trundle 76'		McCann 25'	Stadium: Vetch Field; Attendance: 6,874; Referee: Paul Armstrong

28 August 2004 5	Cambridge United	0–1	Swansea City	Cambridge
15:00 BST			Trundle 82'	Stadium: Abbey Stadium; Attendance: 2,949; Referee: Kevin Friend

30 August 2004 6	Swansea City	1–0	Lincoln City	Swansea
15:00 BST	Iriekpen 3'			Stadium: Vetch Field; Attendance: 6,948; Referee: Keith Stroud

4 September 2004 7	Yeovil Town	1–0	Swansea City	Yeovil
15:00 BST	Williams 85' (pen.)			Stadium: Huish Park; Attendance: 5,826; Referee: Jarnail Singh

11 September 2004 8	Swansea City	3–0	Kidderminster Harriers	Swansea
15:00 BST	Connor 16', 87'; Trundle 53'			Stadium: Vetch Field; Attendance: 6,462; Referee: Fred Graham

18 September 2004 9	Wycombe Wanderers	0–1	Swansea City	High Wycombe
15:00 BST			Robinson 14'	Stadium: Causeway Stadium; Attendance: 5,247; Referee: Peter Walton

25 September 2004 10	Swansea City	1–0	Rushden & Diamonds	Swansea
15:00 BST	Nugent 36'			Stadium: Vetch Field; Attendance: 7,410; Referee: Mark Warren

2 October 2004 11	Chester City	1–1	Swansea City	Chester
15:00 BST	Rapley 19'		Trundle 55' (pen.)	Stadium: Deva Stadium; Attendance: 3,847; Referee: Dermot Gallagher

8 October 2004 12	Swansea City	1–0	Mansfield Town	Swansea
19:45 BST	Forbes 89'			Stadium: Vetch Field; Attendance: 8,868; Referee: Graham Salisbury

16 October 2004 13	Southend United	4–2	Swansea City	Southend-on-Sea
15:00 BST	Eastwood 1', 58', 87'; Prior 42'		Connor 11'; Forbes 82'	Stadium: Roots Hall; Attendance: 4,940; Referee: Mike Russell

19 October 2004 14	Swansea City	1–0	Leyton Orient	Swansea
19:45 BST	Forbes 44'			Stadium: Vetch Field; Attendance: 8,485; Referee: Keith Woolmer

30 October 2004 15	Grimsby Town	1–1	Swansea City	Cleethorpes
15:00 BST	Cramb 56'		Trundle 70' (pen.)	Stadium: Blundell Park; Attendance: 4,618; Referee: Mark Cowburn

6 November 2004 16	Swansea City	1–0	Bristol Rovers	Swansea
15:00 BST	Trundle 88' (pen.)			Stadium: Vetch Field; Attendance: 8,778; Referee: Andy Hall

17 November 2004 17	Swansea City	2–1	Darlington	Swansea
19:45 BST	Trundle 55'; Robinson 59'		Liddle 26'	Stadium: Vetch Field; Attendance: 7,824; Referee: Andre Marriner

20 November 2004 18	Shrewsbury Town	2–0	Swansea City	Shrewsbury
15:00 BST	Sedgemore 21'; Walton 81'			Stadium: Gay Meadow; Attendance: 5,055; Referee: Eddie Evans

27 November 2004 19	Swansea City	1–3	Bury	Swansea
15:00 BST	Nugent 2'		Nugent 3'; Mattis 7'; Barry-Murphy 83'	Stadium: Vetch Field; Attendance: 6,971; Referee: Steve Tanner

8 December 2004 20	Oxford United	0–1	Swansea City	Oxford
19:45 BST			Goodfellow 61'	Stadium: Kassam Stadium; Attendance: 4,767; Referee: Paul Danson

11 December 2004 21	Scunthorpe United	1–0	Swansea City	Scunthorpe
15:00 BST	Torpey 1'			Stadium: Glanford Park; Attendance: 5,075; Referee: Lee Mason

18 December 2004 22	Swansea City	4–0	Notts County	Swansea
15:00 BST	Trundle 42', 71', 90' (pen.); Connor 76'			Stadium: Vetch Field; Attendance: 6,609; Referee: Andy Woolmer

26 December 2004 23	Kidderminster Harriers	1–5	Swansea City	Kidderminster
14:00 BST	Birch 82'		Connor 1'; Iriekpen 9'; Robinson 89' (pen.), 90'; Goodfellow 90'	Stadium: Aggborough Stadium; Attendance: 4,288; Referee: Mark Cowburn

28 December 2004 24	Swansea City	3–1	Boston United	Swansea
15:00 BST	Trundle 4'; Forbes 21'; Goodfellow 27'		Lee 86'	Stadium: Vetch Field; Attendance: 10,162; Referee: Jarnail Singh

1 January 2005 25	Swansea City	0–2	Yeovil Town	Swansea
15:00 BST			Štolcers 78'; Jevons 90'	Stadium: Vetch Field; Attendance: 11,225; Referee: Anthony Bates

3 January 2005 26	Rushden & Diamonds	0–2	Swansea City	Irthlingborough
15:00 BST			Connor 4'; Robinson 22'	Stadium: Nene Park; Attendance: 3,382; Referee: Russell Booth

15 January 2005 27	Swansea City	2–2	Wycombe Wanderers	Swansea
15:00 BST	Connor 51'; Trundle 59' (pen.)		Johnson 77'; Guppy 83'	Stadium: Vetch Field; Attendance: 6,793; Referee: Mick Fletcher

22 January 2005 28	Boston United	2–3	Swansea City	Boston
15:00 BST	Kirk 15'; Rusk 72'		Trundle 52', 90' (pen.); Robinson 62'	Stadium: York Street; Attendance: 2,545; Referee: Grant Hegley

29 January 2005 29	Swansea City	3–0	Chester City	Swansea
15:00 BST	Trundle 42', 61'; Connor 50'			Stadium: Vetch Field; Attendance: 8,989; Referee: Iain Williamson

4 February 2005 30	Swansea City	1–1	Southend United	Swansea
19:45 BST	Trundie 55'		Gray 59'	Stadium: Vetch Field; Attendance: 10,190; Referee: Mark Warren

8 February 2005 31	Mansfield Town	1–0	Swansea City	Mansfield
19:45 BST	Barker 45'			Stadium: Field Mill; Attendance: 3,829; Referee: Paul Taylor

12 February 2005 32	Leyton Orient	3–1	Swansea City	London
15:00 BST	Scott 15'; McMahon 34'; Lockwood 52' (pen.)		Thorpe 81'	Stadium: Matchroom Stadium; Attendance: 4,050; Referee: Fred Graham

19 February 2005 33	Swansea City	0–0	Grimsby Town	Swansea
15:00 BST				Stadium: Vetch Field; Attendance: 7,760; Referee: Scott Mathieson

22 February 2005 34	Darlington	2–1	Swansea City	Swansea
19:30 BST	Clarke 34'; Wainwright 84'		Forbes 37'	Stadium: Williamson Motors Stadium; Attendance: 2,709; Referee: Colin Webster

26 February 2005 35	Swansea City	2–1	Scunthorpe United	Swansea
15:00 BST	Trundle 25', 60' (pen.)		Butler 33'	Stadium: Vetch Field; Attendance: 7,249; Referee: Joe Ross

5 March 2005 36	Notts County	1–0	Swansea City	Nottingham
15:00 BST	Stallard 50'			Stadium: Meadow Lane; Attendance: 4,644; Referee: Paul Robinson

12 March 2005 37	Swansea City	2–2	Rochdale	Swansea
15:00 BST	Gurney 46'; Holt 52' (o.g.)		Holt 31'; Lambert 90+1'	Stadium: Vetch Field; Attendance: 6,804; Referee: Trevor Parkes

19 March 2005 38	Northampton Town	2–2	Swansea City	Northampton
15:00 BST	Smith 35'; Kirk 40'		Connor 30'; Trundle 70'	Stadium: Sixfields Stadium; Attendance: 5,799; Referee: Keith Stroud

25 March 2005 39	Swansea City	2–0	Macclesfield Town	Swansea
19:45 BST	Thorpe 24'; Connor 32'			Stadium: Vetch Field; Attendance: 9,809; Referee: Andre Marriner

28 March 2005 40	Cheltenham Town	1–2	Swansea City	Cheltenham
15:00 BST	Devaney 26'		Thorpe 3'; Britton 82'	Stadium: Whaddon Road; Attendance: 4,669; Referee: Steve Tanner

2 April 2005 41	Swansea City	3–0	Cambridge United	Swansea
15:00 BST	Robinson 65'; Trundle 83', 88'			Stadium: Vetch Field; Attendance: 8,664; Referee: Lee Probert

9 April 2005 42	Lincoln City	1–0	Swansea City	Lincoln
15:00 BST	Monk 90+2' (o.g.)			Stadium: Sincil Bank; Attendance: 5,207; Referee: Richard Beeby

15 April 2005 43	Swansea City	1–0	Oxford United	Swansea
19:45 BST	O'Leary 44'			Stadium: Vetch Field; Attendance: 10,602; Referee: Kevin Friend

23 April 2005 44	Bristol Rovers	2–0	Swansea City	Bristol
15:00 BST	Walker 14'; Agogo 26'			Stadium: Memorial Stadium; Attendance: 7,433; Referee: Mark Cowburn

30 April 2005 45	Swansea City	1–0	Shrewsbury Town	Swansea
15:00 BST	Forbes 8'			Stadium: Vetch Field; Attendance: 11,469; Referee: Ray Olivier

7 May 2005 46	Bury	0–1	Swansea City	Bury
15:00 BST			Forbes 1'	Stadium: Gigg Lane; Attendance: 7,575; Referee: Colin Webster

=== FA Cup ===
14 November 2004 First round proper	Cheltenham Town	1–3	Swansea City	Cheltenham
14:00 BST	Spencer 71'		O'Leary 19'; Trundle 46'; Connor 90'	Stadium: Whaddon Road; Attendance: 4,551; Referee: Iain Williamson

4 December 2004 Second round proper, 1st leg	Stockport County	0–0	Swansea City	Stockport
15:00 BST				Stadium: Edgeley Park; Attendance: 2,680; Referee: Mike Pike

14 December 2004 Second round proper, 2nd leg	Swansea City	2–1	Stockport County	Swansea
19:45 BST	Connor 47'; Goodfellow 88'		Griffin 72'	Stadium: Vetch Field; Attendance: 5,572; Referee: Steve Tanner

8 January 2005 Third round proper, 1st leg	Reading	1–1	Swansea City	Reading
15:00 BST	Ingimarsson 88'		Connor 32'	Stadium: Madejski Stadium; Attendance: 13,642; Referee: Clive Penton

17 January 2005 Third round proper, 2nd leg	Swansea City	0–1 (a.e.t.)	Reading	Swansea
19:45 BST			Forster 95'	Stadium: Vetch Field; Attendance: 7,354; Referee: Clive Penton

=== League Cup ===
24 August 2004 First round	Queens Park Rangers	3–0	Swansea City	London
19:45 BST	Cureton 39'; Rowlands 77'; Gallen 90'			Stadium: Loftus Road; Attendance: 4,882; Referee: Steve Tanner

=== Football League Trophy ===
28 September 2004 First round	Swansea City	2–0	Luton Town	Swansea
19:45 BST	Nugent 90'; Ricketts 90+1'			Stadium: Vetch Field; Attendance: 3,559; Referee: Scott Mathieson

2 November 2004 Second round	Wycombe Wanderers	1–0	Swansea City	High Wycombe
19:45 BST	Birchall 4'			Stadium: Causeway Stadium; Attendance: 1,021; Referee: Keith Stroud
