= 2006–07 Swansea City A.F.C. season =

Swansea City
2006–07 season
- Manager: Kenny Jackett (until 15 February); Kevin Nugent (caretaker; 15 February – 24 February); Roberto Martínez (from 24 February)
- Stadium: Liberty Stadium
- League One: 7th
- FA Cup: Fourth round
- League Cup: First round
- Football League Trophy: Second round

During the 2006–07 English football season, Swansea City Football Club competed in Football League One where they finished in 7th position with 72 points.

== Season summary ==
Manager Kenny Jackett left the club by "mutual agreement" on 15 February 2007, with Kevin Nugent replacing him as a caretaker manager. Roberto Martínez was appointed as manager on 24 February.

== Final league table ==
Pos	Team	Pld	W	D	L	GF	GA	GD	Pts	Promotion, qualification or relegation
5	Yeovil Town	46	23	10	13	55	39	+16	79	Qualification for League One play-offs
6	Oldham Athletic	46	21	12	13	69	47	+22	75	Qualification for League One play-offs
7	Swansea City	46	20	12	14	69	53	+16	72	
8	Carlisle United	46	19	11	16	54	55	−1	68	
9	Tranmere Rovers	46	18	13	15	58	53	+5	67	

Rules for classification: In the Football League goals scored (GF) takes precedence over goal difference (GD).

== Results ==
Swansea City's score comes first

=== Legend ===
Win	Draw	Loss

=== Football League One ===
Match	Date	Opponent	Venue	Result	Attendance	Scorers
1	5 August 2006	Cheltenham Town	H	1–2	15,199	Knight
2	8 August 2006	Scunthorpe United	A	2–2	4,187	Robinson, Fallon
3	12 August 2006	Oldham Athletic	A	0–1	4,708	
4	19 August 2006	Doncaster Rovers	H	2–0	12,218	Trundle (2)
5	26 August 2006	Leyton Orient	A	1–0	4,162	Knight
6	1 September 2006	Yeovil Town	H	1–1	14,513	Trundle
7	9 September 2006	Bradford City	H	1–0	11,418	Robinson
8	12 September 2006	Brentford	A	2–0	5,392	Knight (2)
9	16 September 2006	Gillingham	A	1–3	5,500	Knight
10	23 September 2006	Huddersfield Town	H	1–2	12,202	Knight
11	26 September 2006	Crewe Alexandra	H	2–1	10,031	Knight, Fallon
12	30 September 2006	Nottingham Forest	A	1–3	19,034	Fallon
13	6 October 2006	Tranmere Rovers	H	0–0	12,347	
14	14 October 2006	Chesterfield	A	3–2	3,918	Trundle (2), Britton
15	22 October 2006	Millwall	H	2–0	13,975	Britton, Lawrence
16	28 October 2006	Northampton Town	A	0–1	5,444	
17	3 November 2006	Bournemouth	H	4–2	11,795	Iriekpen, Trundle, Fallon (2)
18	18 November 2006	Port Vale	A	2–0	4,615	Trundle, Butler
19	26 November 2006	Bristol City	H	0–0	15,531	
20	5 December 2006	Brighton & Hove Albion	A	2–3	5,209	Lawrence, Fallon
21	9 December 2006	Blackpool	A	1–1	6,216	Dickinson (o.g.)
22	16 December 2006	Carlisle United	H	5–0	12,550	Lawrence, Fallon (2), Robinson, Pratley
23	23 December 2006	Rotherham United	H	1–1	12,327	Akinfenwa
24	26 December 2006	Crewe Alexandra	A	3–1	6,083	Trundle (2), Lawrence
25	30 December 2006	Huddersfield Town	A	2–3	9,393	Trundle (2), Lawrence
26	1 January 2007	Brentford	H	2–0	12,554	Osborne (o.g.), Akinfenwa
27	13 January 2007	Bradford City	A	2–2	7,347	O'Leary, Akinfenwa
28	20 January 2007	Nottingham Forest	H	0–0	16,849	
29	20 January 2007	Gillingham	H	2–0	9,675	Akinfenwa, Robinson
30	3 February 2007	Cheltenham Town	A	1–2	5,221	Trundle
31	10 February 2007	Oldham Athletic	H	0–1	9,880	
32	17 February 2007	Doncaster Rovers	A	2–2	7,900	Akinfenwa, Trundle
33	20 February 2007	Scunthorpe United	H	0–2	10,746	
34	24 February 2007	Yeovil Town	A	0–1	5,984	
35	27 February 2007	Rotherham United	A	2–1	3,697	Trundle, Abbott
36	3 March 2007	Leyton Orient	H	0–0	12,901	
37	10 March 2007	Tranmere Rovers	A	2–0	7,467	Trundle, Robinson
38	16 March 2007	Chesterfield	H	2–0	11,384	Iriekpen, Robinson
39	24 March 2007	Northampton Town	H	2–1	11,071	Lawrence, Robinson
40	31 March 2007	Millwall	A	0–2	9,249	
41	7 April 2007	Bristol City	A	0–0	14,025	
42	9 April 2007	Port Vale	H	3–0	12,465	Trundle, Duffy
43	14 April 2007	Bournemouth	A	2–2	6,786	Trundle, Tate
44	21 April 2007	Brighton & Hove Albion	H	2–1	11,972	Duffy (2)
45	28 April 2007	Carlisle United	A	2–1	10,578	Trundle, Duffy
46	5 May 2007	Blackpool	H	3–6	18,903	Trundle, Iriekpen (2)

=== FA Cup ===
Round	Date	Opponent	Venue	Result	Attendance	Scorers
R1	11 November 2006	Newport County	A	3–1	4,660	Trundle, Iriekpen, Britton
R2	2 December 2006	Darlington	A	3–1	4,183	Britton, Robinson, Akinfenwa
R3	6 January 2007	Sheffield United	A	3–0	15,896	Britton, Butler (2)
R4	27 January 2007	Ipswich Town	A	0–1	16,635	

=== League Cup ===
Round	Date	Opponent	Venue	Result	Attendance	Scorers
R1	22 August 2006	Wycombe Wanderers	H	2–3	5,892	Pratley, Williamson (o.g.)

=== Football League Trophy ===
Round	Date	Opponent	Venue	Result	Attendance	Scorers
R1	17 October 2006	Walsall	A	1–1 (4–3 pens)	2,557	Tudur-Jones
R2	31 October 2006	Peterborough United	A	0–1	1,432	

== Squad statistics ==
No.	Pos.	Name	League		FA Cup		League Cup		Other		Total	
No.	Pos.	Name	Apps	Goals	Apps	Goals	Apps	Goals	Apps	Goals	Apps	Goals
1	GK	(France) Willy Guéret	42	0	4	0	1	0	1	0	48	0
2	DF	(England) Kevin Amankwaah	23(6)	0	2(1)	0	1	0	2	0	28(7)	0
3	DF	(Trinidad and Tobago) Kevin Austin	26(4)	0	3	0	1	0	2	0	32(4)	0
4	MF	(Wales) Kristian O'Leary	19(4)	1	1(1)	0	1	0	1	0	22(4)	1
5	MF	(England) Alan Tate	36(2)	1	4	0	0	0	2	0	42(2)	1
6	MF	(England) Izzy Iriekpen	31(1)	4	2(1)	1	1	0	0	0	34(2)	5
7	MF	(England) Leon Britton	39(2)	2	4	3	1	0	0	0	44(2)	5
8	MF	(England) Darren Pratley	25(3)	1	2	0	1	1	1	0	29(3)	2
9	FW	(England) Adebayo Akinfenwa	12(13)	5	2(2)	1	0(1)	0	1	0	15(16)	6
10	FW	(England) Lee Trundle	31(3)	19	2(1)	1	1	0	1(1)	0	35(5)	20
11	FW	(Poland) Pawel Abbott	9(9)	1	0(1)	0	0	0	0	0	9(10)	1
11	FW	(New Zealand) Rory Fallon	22(2)	8	2(1)	0	1	0	0	0	25(3)	8
12	DF	(Scotland) Steven Watt	0(1)	0	0	0	0	0	1	0	1(1)	0
14	MF	(Republic of Ireland) Marcos Painter	22(1)	1	0(1)	0	0	0	0	0	22(2)	1
14	MF	(England) Kevin McLeod	2(2)	0	0	0	1	0	0	0	3(2)	0
15	MF	(Cyprus) Tom Williams	17(12)	0	2	0	0(1)	0	0(2)	0	19(15)	0
16	DF	(England) Garry Monk	2	0	0	0	0	0	0	0	2	0
17	MF	(Wales) Owain Tudur-Jones	3	0	0	0	0	0	1(1)	1	4(1)	1
18	MF	(England) Andy Robinson	33(6)	7	3	1	0	0	1	0	37(6)	8
19	MF	(England) Darren Way	4(5)	0	0	0	0	0	0	0	4(5)	0
20	MF	(Wales) Shaun MacDonald	3(5)	0	2	0	0	0	2	0	7(5)	0
22	DF	(Trinidad and Tobago) Dennis Lawrence	37(2)	5	4	0	1	0	2	0	44(2)	5
24	FW	(Scotland) Darryl Duffy	5(3)	5	0	0	0	0	0	0	5(3)	5
24	FW	(England) Leon Knight	10(1)	7	0	0	0	0	0	0	10(1)	7
28	MF	(Republic of Ireland) Thomas Butler	17(13)	1	3(1)	2	0(1)	0	2	0	22(15)	3
29	MF	(England) Ian Craney	24(3)	0	0	0	0	0	0	0	24(3)	0
30	DF	(Wales) Richard Duffy	8(3)	0	1	0	0	0	0	0	9(3)	0
30	DF	(France) Sylvain Meslien	0(1)	0	1	0	0	0	0	0	1(1)	0
32	MF	(Wales) Joe Allen	0(1)	0	0	0	0	0	0	0	0(1)	0
