= Leon Britton =

English footballer and coach (born 1982)

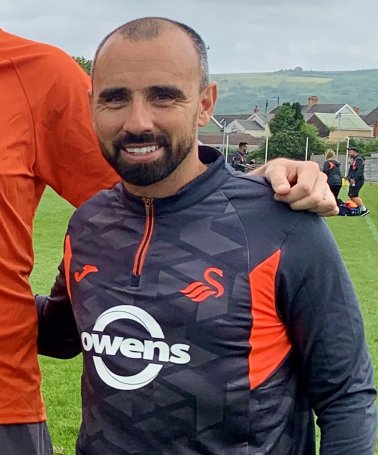
- Britton in 2023

Personal information
- Full name: Leon James Britton
- Date of birth: 16 September 1982 (age 44)
- Place of birth: Merton, England
- Height: 5 ft 4 in (1.63 m)
- Position: Midfielder

Youth career
- 1991–1998: Arsenal
- 1998–1999: West Ham United

Senior career*
Years	Team	Apps	(Gls)
1999–2003	West Ham United	0	(0)
2002–2003	→ Swansea City (loan)	25	(0)
2003–2010	Swansea City	270	(10)
2010–2011	Sheffield United	24	(0)
2011–2018	Swansea City	166	(1)
2019	Llanelli Town	2	(0)
2021	Ammanford	9	(0)
Total		506	(11)

International career
1998–1999	England U16	2	(0)

Managerial career
- 2017: Swansea City (caretaker)
- * Club domestic league appearances and goals as of 13:53, 5 September 2019 (UTC)

Leon James Britton (born 16 September 1982) is an English footballer and coach who last played for Swansea City. A midfielder, he spent most of his career with Swansea City, having joined the club on a permanent transfer in 2003. Britton went on to make 520 appearances for the club. He joined Sheffield United in the summer of 2010, but transferred back to Swansea in January 2011, becoming a central figure in Swansea's successful promotion campaign. He remains one of a small number of players to have represented any club in all four professional divisions of the English footballing pyramid, along with Billy Sharp, Brett Ormerod, and former Swansea teammates Alan Tate and Garry Monk. Britton later played twice for Llanelli Town and signed for Ammanford in February 2021.

== Playing career ==
=== Youth career ===
A member of the England Development School at Lilleshall where he was a year behind Joe Cole, Britton began his career as an Arsenal trainee at the age of nine. When he signed for West Ham United for £400,000 in 1998, he attracted the highest transfer fee ever paid for a 16-year-old at that time.

Loan to Swansea

Unable to break into the first team at West Ham, Britton joined Swansea City on loan in December 2002, helping the club to avoid relegation from the Football League. The move was funded in part by a bucket collection by Swansea supporters in a campaign dubbed "The Battle For Britton". He was named PFA Fans' Player of the Year for the Third Division in the 2002–03 season as well as Swansea City player of the year. Swansea manager Brian Flynn was impressed enough to sign him permanently after he was released by West Ham.

=== Swansea City ===
On 16 September 2005, Britton scored his first goal for the club; the opener in a 3–0 win over Macclesfield. Later that season, he played 90 minutes as Swansea beat Carlisle United in the Johnstone's Paint Trophy Final at the Millennium Stadium. Britton then played 120 minutes in the League One play-off final, in which Swansea lost on penalties to Barnsley. Including his appearances whilst on loan with the club, to the end of the 2005–06 season, Britton had played 137 times for Swansea City in all competitions (with a further 18 appearances as a substitute) and had scored nine goals.

Britton won his second Swansea City player of the season award for the 2006–07 season, as Swansea again pushed for promotion to the Championship. Swansea needed to overcome a 4-goal deficit on the final day of the season at home to fellow promotion-chasers Blackpool. Blackpool won 6–3.

On 9 February 2008, Britton played his 200th match for Swansea City. Britton played 48 games in all competitions as Swansea won League One with 92 points, 10 points clear of second-placed Nottingham Forest. This saw the club promoted to the second tier for the first time since 1984.

Britton continued to be a fixture in the Swansea City team in the second tier, playing 48 games in the 2008–09 season. In January 2010, Swansea rejected an £750,000 offer for Britton from Wigan Athletic but at the end of that season Britton refused the offer of a new contract and became a free agent.

=== Sheffield United ===
Despite interest from the Premier League, Britton signed for Sheffield United in June 2010. He was handed a regular role in the centre of the Blades midfield but failed to really show the form he had displayed at Swansea. A difficult period for the club, Britton played under four managers within the space of five months and eventually asked to return to his former employer, stating that his previous transfer had been a "mistake" and that he "should never have left Swansea". The Blades admitted that he had never settled in South Yorkshire and agreed to let him return to Wales after only 26 appearances for the club.

=== Return to Swansea ===
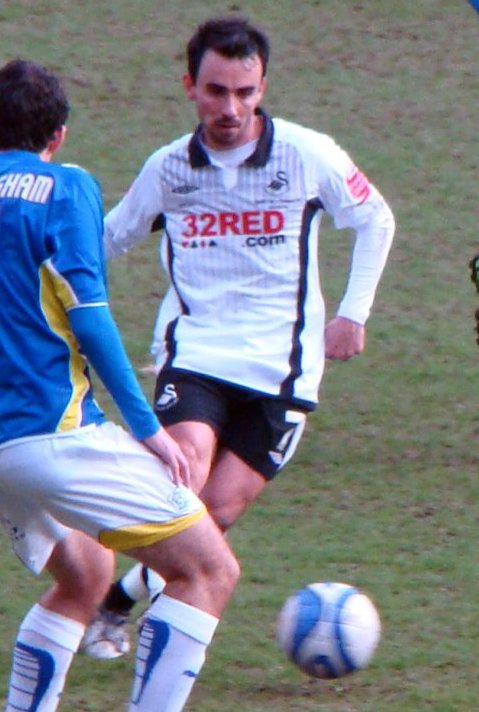
Britton playing for Swansea City in 2011

Britton re-signed for Swansea City for what the Blades described as an "undisclosed fee" during the January transfer window despite the Swans insisting no fee was involved. The fee was clause based and included up to £400,000 depending on appearances and Swansea's promotion to the Premier League.

Britton's second Swansea City debut came in a draw with Barnsley on 20 January 2011. He scored his first goal of the season (his first goal in three and a half years) against his former employers Sheffield United in the final match of the regular season.

The 2010–11 season ended with Swansea City being promoted to the Premier League for the first time in their history following a 4–2 victory over Reading in the Championship Play-off Final at Wembley Stadium. Britton started the match at Wembley and completed 77 minutes before being substituted by Mark Gower.

In 2011, Britton was the world's best passer in 2011 for players with over 1,000 passes with a pass accuracy of 93.3%, beating out the likes of Barcelona player Xavi (who had a pass accuracy of 93%) and Chelsea player John Terry (who had a pass accuracy of 91.6%).

Following Swansea's promotion, Britton made his Premier League debut in a 4–0 loss against Manchester City on 15 August 2011 where he played in central midfield. Britton stated he would like to finish his career with the club and admitted he cannot imagine playing elsewhere.

On 30 March 2012, Britton signed a contract extension at Swansea City, contracting him until the end of the 2015 campaign. On 5 February 2013, Britton signed a one-year contract extension on improved terms with Swansea City, keeping at the club until June 2016. Later that month, Britton played as Swansea beat Bradford City 5–0 in the 2013 League Cup Final at Wembley Stadium.

Britton continued to be a first team regular until the 2014–15 season, in which injuries limited him to only nine appearances. In the 2016–17 season, Britton was named club captain following the departure of Ashley Williams. Despite limited game time, Britton played a vital role in helping Swansea to survive relegation from the Premier League. Britton bought each of his teammates a DVD of Jack to a King, to showcase the history of the club in the run-in to the end of the season. Britton also encouraged his teammates to fully subsidise away tickets to Sunderland, for a game which ultimately out Swansea on the verge of survival. At the end of that season, Swansea Council awarded Britton the Freedom of the city.

In November 2017, Britton was named player-coach following the departure of Claude Makélélé. In doing so, he was replaced as captain by Àngel Rangel. In December, Britton was named interim head coach following Paul Clement's sacking. On 11 May 2018, it was announced that Britton would retire from professional football after the end of the 2017–18 season. He opted to become a club ambassador following Swansea City's relegation to the Championship.

=== Llanelli Town ===
In January 2019, Britton returned to football, joining Welsh Premier League side Llanelli Town. He made his debut for the club in a 2–1 win over Llandudno. On 2 February 2019, in a 0–0 draw away at Cefn Druids in his second league game for the club, Britton suffered a broken foot.

== Coaching and backroom roles ==
In November 2017, Swansea manager Paul Clement appointed Britton as an assistant coach, after the departure of Claude Makélélé from the coaching staff. Britton remained available for selection as a player, but relinquished his captaincy following his coaching appointment.

Britton was named caretaker manager at Swansea on 21 December 2017, after the dismissal of Clement the previous day. In his first game in charge, on 23 December, Swansea drew 1–1 at home to Crystal Palace, a result which left them at the bottom of the league. Britton remained in charge for Swansea's Boxing Day match against Liverpool at Anfield, where the Swans were comprehensively beaten 5–0. This was his last match as caretaker manager as the Swans appointed former Sheffield Wednesday coach Carlos Carvalhal as their new manager. Britton then chose to relinquish his coaching duties to concentrate on playing.

Britton was appointed football advisor to the board of directors at Swansea City on 21 May 2019. Along with chairman Trevor Birch and club president Alan Curtis, Britton helped choose Steve Cooper as Swansea's new manager following the departure of Graham Potter in 2019. Britton was appointed Swansea's first Sporting Director on 4 September 2019, but relinquished his duties in June 2020.

In November 2025, Britton and former midfield partner Joe Allen were appointed interim coaches under Vítor Matos while the club awaited work permits for Matos' team. In December, it was announced that the club would be keeping the pair on as coaches.

== Personal life ==
Britton was born in Merton, Greater London and played a young Ryan Giggs in a road safety advertisement in the 1990s. Britton also appeared in a Walkers Crisps advert with former England international Gary Lineker.

== Career statistics ==
Appearances and goals by club, season and competition
Club	Season	League			FA Cup		League Cup		Europe		Other		Total	
Club	Season	Division	Apps	Goals	Apps	Goals	Apps	Goals	Apps	Goals	Apps	Goals	Apps	Goals
Swansea City (loan)	2002–03	League Two	25	0	—		—		—		—		25	0
Swansea City	2003–04	League Two	42	3	5	0	1	0	—		0	0	48	3
Swansea City	2004–05	League Two	30	1	3	0	1	0	—		1 (Note: Appearance in Football League Trophy.)	0	35	1
Swansea City	2005–06	League One	38	4	1	0	1	0	—		7 (Note: Four appearances and one goal in Football League Trophy, three appearances in Football League play-offs.)	1	47	5
Swansea City	2006–07	League One	41	2	4	3	1	0	—		1	0	47	5
Swansea City	2007–08	League One	40	0	5	1	2	0	—		1	0	48	1
Swansea City	2008–09	Championship	43	0	4	0	1	0	—		—		48	0
Swansea City	2009–10	Championship	36	0	0	0	2	0	—		—		38	0
Swansea City	Total		295	10	22	4	9	0	—		10	1	336	15
Sheffield United	2010–11	Championship	24	0	1	0	1	0	—		—		26	0
Swansea City	2010–11	Championship	17	1	—		—		—		3 (Note: Appearances in Football League play-offs.)	1	20	2
Swansea City	2011–12	Premier League	36	0	1	0	—		—		—		37	0
Swansea City	2012–13	Premier League	33	0	2	0	6	0	—		—		41	0
Swansea City	2013–14	Premier League	25	0	2	0	1	0	6 (Note: Appearances in UEFA Europa League.)	0	—		34	0
Swansea City	2014–15	Premier League	9	0	0	0	0	0	—		—		9	0
Swansea City	2015–16	Premier League	25	0	0	0	2	0	—		—		27	0
Swansea City	2016–17	Premier League	8	0	0	0	2	0	—		—		10	0
Swansea City	2017–18	Premier League	5	0	1	0	0	0	—		—		6	0
Swansea City	Total		453	11	28	4	20	0	6	0	13	2	520	17
Career total			477	11	29	4	21	0	6	0	13	2	546	17

== Managerial statistics ==
As of 28 December 2017

Managerial record by team and tenure
Team	From	To	Record					Ref
Team	From	To	P	W	D	L	Win %	Ref
Swansea City (caretaker)	21 December 2017	28 December 2017	2	0	1	1	0.0	
Total			2	0	1	1	0.0	—

== Honours ==
Swansea City

- Football League Championship play-offs: 2011
- Football League One: 2007–08
- Football League Two third-place promotion: 2004–05
- Football League Cup: 2012–13
- Football League Trophy: 2005–06
- FAW Premier Cup: 2004–05, 2005–06

Individual

- PFA Fans' Player of the Year: 2002–03 Third Division
- Swansea City Player of the Year: 2002–03, 2006–07
