= 2008–09 Leeds United F.C. season =

2008–09 season of Leeds United

Leeds United
2008–09 season
- Chairman: Ken Bates
- Manager: Gary McAllister (until 21 December); Simon Grayson (from 23 December)
- Stadium: Elland Road
- League One: 4th (qualified for play-offs)
- Play-offs: Semi-finals
- FA Cup: Second round
- League Cup: Fourth round
- League Trophy: Second round northern
- Top goalscorer: League: Jermaine Beckford (27); All: Jermaine Beckford (34)
- Highest home attendance: 37,036 vs Millwall (14 May 2009, Play-offs)
- Lowest home attendance: 9,531 vs Northampton Town (7 November 2008, FA Cup)
- Average home league attendance: 22,849
Home colours	Away colours	Third colours

The 2008–09 season saw Leeds United competing in League One (known as the Coca-Cola Football League for sponsorship reasons) for a second successive season.

== Pre-season and friendlies ==
Leeds United announced pre-season friendlies against York City, Galway United, Bray Wanderers, Shelbourne, Barnet, Darlington and FCV Dender.

Win Draw Loss Fixtures

11 July 2008	York City	1–1	Leeds United	York
19:30 BST	Sodje 43'	Report	Beckford 25'	Stadium: Bootham Crescent; Attendance: 4,405; Referee: Jon Moss

16 July 2008	Galway United	0–2	Leeds United	Galway
19:30 BST		Report	Beckford 25', 46'	Stadium: Terryland Park; Attendance: 2,749; Referee: Padraigh Sutton

20 July 2008	Bray Wanderers	2–3	Leeds United	Bray
15:00 BST	Robson 9'; Rowe 32'	Report	Marques 55'; Haber 68'; Howson 83'	Stadium: Carlisle Grounds; Attendance: 5,500; Referee: Tomás Connolly

23 July 2008	Shelbourne	1–1	Leeds United	Drumcondra
19:30 BST	Flood 23'	Report	Huntington 45'	Stadium: Tolka Park; Attendance: 3,127; Referee: Ian Stokes

26 July 2008	Barnet	0–2	Leeds United	Barnet
15:00 BST		Report	Robinson 36'; Howson 49'	Stadium: Underhill; Attendance: 2,644; Referee: Mick Russell

29 July 2008	Darlington	0–0	Leeds United	Darlington
19.30 BST		Report		Stadium: The Darlington Arena; Attendance: 3,441; Referee: Eddie Ilderton

2 August 2008	Leeds United	4–1	FCV Dender	Leeds
15.00 BST	Huntington 24', 86'; Marques 28'; Beckford 34'	Report	Van Den Eede 55'	Stadium: Elland Road; Attendance: 7,041; Referee: Uriah Rennie

== Competitions ==
=== League One ===
==== League table ====
Pos	Team	Pld	W	D	L	GF	GA	GD	Pts	Promotion or relegation
2	Peterborough United (P)	46	26	11	9	78	54	+24	89	Promotion to Football League Championship
3	Milton Keynes Dons	46	26	9	11	83	47	+36	87	Qualification for League One play-offs
4	Leeds United	46	26	6	14	77	49	+28	84	Qualification for League One play-offs
5	Millwall	46	25	7	14	63	53	+10	82	Qualification for League One play-offs
6	Scunthorpe United (O, P)	46	22	10	14	82	63	+19	76	Qualification for League One play-offs

Updated to match(es) played on 2 May 2009. Source: The Football League
Rules for classification: 1) points; 2) goal difference; 3) number of goals scored.
(O) Play-off winners; (P) Promoted

==== Results summary ====
Overall								Home						Away					
Pld	W	D	L	GF	GA	GD	Pts	W	D	L	GF	GA	GD	W	D	L	GF	GA	GD
46	26	6	14	77	49	+28	84	17	2	4	49	20	+29	9	4	10	28	29	−1

Source: Statto

==== Results by round ====
Round	1	2	3	4	5	6	7	8	9	10	11	12	13	14	15	16	17	18	19	20	21	22	23	24	25	26	27	28	29	30	31	32	33	34	35	36	37	38	39	40	41	42	43	44	45	46
Ground	A	H	A	H	H	A	A	H	A	H	A	H	H	A	A	H	H	A	A	H	A	H	A	H	A	H	H	A	H	A	A	H	H	A	A	H	H	A	H	A	A	H	A	H	A	H
Result	W	L	D	D	W	W	W	W	L	W	L	W	W	L	W	L	W	L	L	L	L	D	W	L	W	W	W	L	W	L	L	W	W	D	D	W	W	W	W	W	D	W	L	W	W	W
Position	8	13	12	14	6	4	3	3	4	3	5	4	2	3	2	6	6	7	7	8	9	9	9	10	9	7	7	7	7	7	8	8	6	5	7	5	5	5	5	5	5	5	5	5	5	4

Source: Statto.com
A = Away; H = Home; W = Win; D = Draw; L = Loss

==== Matches ====
9 August 2008 1	Scunthorpe United	1–2	Leeds United	Scunthorpe
12:00 BST	Hooper 57'	Report	Showunmi 61'; Beckford 80'	Stadium: Glanford Park; Attendance: 8,315; Referee: Lee Probert

16 August 2008 2	Leeds United	0–2	Oldham Athletic	Leeds
15:00 BST		Report	Taylor 51', 65'	Stadium: Elland Road; Attendance: 24,631; Referee: Mike Russell

23 August 2008 3	Yeovil Town	1–1	Leeds United	Yeovil
13:00 BST	Owusu 62' (pen.)	Report	Becchio 1'	Stadium: Huish Park; Attendance: 6,580; Referee: Dean Whitestone

30 August 2008 4	Leeds United	2–2	Bristol Rovers	Leeds
15:00 BST	Beckford 5', 77'	Report	Lambert 32'; Duffy 37'	Stadium: Elland Road; Attendance: 21,024; Referee: Kevin Wright

6 September 2008 5	Leeds United	5–2	Crewe Alexandra	Leeds
15:00 BST	Delph 26'; Sheehan 36'; Douglas 48'; Beckford 66'; Robinson 81'	Report	Bopp 90+3'; Zola 90+4'	Stadium: Elland Road; Attendance: 20,075; Referee: Trevor Kettle

13 September 2008 6	Swindon Town	1–3	Leeds United	Swindon
15:00 BST	Cox 45'	Report	Beckford 22', 84'; Kilkenny 50'	Stadium: County Ground; Attendance: 13,001; Referee: Darren Deadman

20 September 2008 7	Carlisle United	0–2	Leeds United	Carlisle
12:15 BST		Report	Becchio 32'; Beckford 86'	Stadium: Brunton Park; Attendance: 12,138; Referee: Peter Walton

27 September 2008 8	Leeds United	1–0	Hereford United	Leeds
15:00 BST	Robinson 72'	Report		Stadium: Elland Road; Attendance: 25,676; Referee: Graham Laws

4 October 2008 9	Peterborough United	2–0	Leeds United	Peterborough
12:00 BST	Boyd 47'; Mackail-Smith 90+1'	Report		Stadium: London Road Stadium; Attendance: 13,191; Referee: Lee Probert

11 October 2008 10	Leeds United	3–1	Brighton & Hove Albion	Leeds
15:00 BST	Becchio 44'; Beckford 45+1', 90'	Report	Murray 90+3'	Stadium: Elland Road; Attendance: 22,726; Referee: Carl Boyeson

18 October 2008 11	Millwall	3–1	Leeds United	Bermondsey
15:00 BST	Martin 37'; Harris 59', 88'	Report	Becchio 31'	Stadium: The Den; Attendance: 13,041; Referee: Andre Marriner

21 October 2008 12	Leeds United	2–1	Leyton Orient	Leeds
19:45 BST	Purches 39' (o.g.); Becchio 45'	Report	Morgan 36'	Stadium: Elland Road; Attendance: 18,990; Referee: Colin Webster

25 October 2008 13	Leeds United	3–0	Walsall	Leeds
15:00 BST	Becchio 46'; Delph 65', 86'	Report		Stadium: Elland Road; Attendance: 26,422; Referee: Grant Hegley

28 October 2008 14	Southend United	1–0	Leeds United	Southend
19:45 BST	Harding 18'	Report		Stadium: Roots Hall; Attendance: 10,132; Referee: Pat Miller

1 November 2008 15	Cheltenham Town	0–1	Leeds United	Cheltenham
15:00 BST		Report	Becchio 7'	Stadium: Whaddon Road; Attendance: 5,726; Referee: Fred Graham

15 November 2008 16	Leeds United	1–2	Huddersfield Town	Leeds
12:15 GMT	Snodgrass 3'	Report	Skarz 46'; Collins 90+2'	Stadium: Elland Road; Attendance: 32,028; Referee: Mark Halsey

22 November 2008 17	Leeds United	4–1	Hartlepool United	Leeds
15:00 GMT	Beckford 14', 90+1'; Delph 50'; Becchio 64'	Report	Porter 24'	Stadium: Elland Road; Attendance: 21,182; Referee: Graham Salisbury

25 November 2008 18	Northampton Town	2–1	Leeds United	Northampton
19:45 GMT	Davis 27'; Bignall 87'	Report	Beckford 68'	Stadium: Sixfields Stadium; Attendance: 6,008; Referee: Chris Foy

6 December 2008 19	Tranmere Rovers	2–1	Leeds United	Tranmere
15:00 GMT	Kay 17'; Moore 46'	Report	Showunmi 10'	Stadium: Prenton Park; Attendance: 8,700; Referee: Rob Shoebridge

13 December 2008 20	Leeds United	1–2	Colchester United	Leeds
15:00 GMT	Snodgrass 14'	Report	Hammond 45+2'; Yeates 66'	Stadium: Elland Road; Attendance: 19,625; Referee: Nigel Miller

20 December 2008 21	Milton Keynes Dons	3–1	Leeds United	Milton Keynes
15:00 GMT	O'Hanlon 11'; Wilbraham 17', 55'	Report	Snodgrass 49'	Stadium: Stadium MK; Attendance: 17,073; Referee: Tony Bates

26 December 2008 22	Leeds United	1–1	Leicester City	Leeds
15:00 GMT	Snodgrass 90'	Report	Oakley 24'	Stadium: Elland Road; Attendance: 33,580; Referee: Mark Halsey

28 December 2008 23	Stockport County	1–3	Leeds United	Stockport
12:00 GMT	Mullins 2'	Report	Becchio 19'; Delph 73'; Christie 87'	Stadium: Edgeley Park; Attendance: 10,273; Referee: Richard Beeby

10 January 2009 24	Leeds United	0–2	Carlisle United	Leeds
15:00 GMT		Report	Graham 27'; Bridges 35'	Stadium: Elland Road; Attendance: 22,411; Referee: Kevin Friend

17 January 2009 25	Brighton & Hove Albion	0–2	Leeds United	Brighton
15:00 GMT		Report	Trundle 61'; Delph 82'	Stadium: Withdean Stadium; Attendance: 7,096; Referee: Pat Miller

24 January 2009 26	Leeds United	3–1	Peterborough United	Leeds
15:00 GMT	Beckford 62', 71'; Howson 90+1'	Report	Mackail-Smith 80'	Stadium: Elland Road; Attendance: 22,766; Referee: Anthony Taylor

27 January 2009 27	Leeds United	2–0	Southend United	Leeds
19:45 GMT	Marques 6'; Naylor 11'	Report		Stadium: Elland Road; Attendance: 20,392; Referee: David Foster

31 January 2009 28	Walsall	1–0	Leeds United	Walsall
15:00 GMT	Deeney 7'	Report		Stadium: Bescot Stadium; Attendance: 8,920; Referee: Kevin Wright

9 February 2009 29	Leeds United	2–0	Millwall	Leeds
15:00 GMT	Beckford 32', 90+2'	Report		Stadium: Elland Road; Attendance: 19,314; Referee: Alan Wiley

14 February 2009 30	Huddersfield Town	1–0	Leeds United	Huddersfield
12:00 GMT	Clarke 16'	Report		Stadium: Galpharm Stadium; Attendance: 20,928; Referee: Paul Taylor

17 February 2009 31	Hereford United	2–0	Leeds United	Hereford
19:45 GMT	Myrie-Williams 39'; Brandy 63'	Report		Stadium: Edgar Street; Attendance: 6,120; Referee: Graham Horwood

21 February 2009 32	Leeds United	2–0	Cheltenham Town	Leeds
15:00 GMT	Howson 54', 66'	Report		Stadium: Elland Road; Attendance: 20,131; Referee: Peter Walton

28 February 2009 33	Leeds United	3–2	Scunthorpe United	Leeds
15:00 GMT	Beckford 33', 67'; Johnson 38'	Report	Hooper 42', 51'	Stadium: Elland Road; Attendance: 24,921; Referee: Iain Williamson

2 March 2009 34	Oldham Athletic	1–1	Leeds United	Oldham
19:45 GMT	Hughes 51'	Report	Becchio 52'	Stadium: Boundary Park; Attendance: 7,835; Referee: Russell Booth

7 March 2009 35	Bristol Rovers	2–2	Leeds United	Bristol
15:00 GMT	Hughes 14'; Kuffour 90'	Report	Becchio 27'; Snodgrass 58'	Stadium: Memorial Stadium; Attendance: 10,293; Referee: Andre Marriner

10 March 2009 36	Leeds United	4–0	Yeovil Town	Leeds
19:45 GMT	Beckford 26', 51', 58'; Kilkenny 43'	Report		Stadium: Elland Road; Attendance: 18,847; Referee: Andy Haines

14 March 2009 37	Leeds United	1–0	Swindon Town	Leeds
15:00 GMT	Beckford 87'	Report		Stadium: Elland Road; Attendance: 21,765; Referee: Keith Stroud

21 March 2009 38	Crewe Alexandra	2–3	Leeds United	Crewe
15:00 GMT	Pope 60', 73'	Report	Kilkenny 27'; Becchio 30'; Snodgrass 33'	Stadium: Alexandra Stadium; Attendance: 7,138; Referee: Scott Mathieson

28 March 2009 39	Leeds United	2–0	Milton Keynes Dons	Leeds
15:00 GMT	Beckford 37', 54'	Report		Stadium: Elland Road; Attendance: 27,649; Referee: Neil Swarbrick

4 April 2009 40	Colchester United	0–1	Leeds United	Colchester
15:00 BST		Report	Becchio 28'	Stadium: Colchester Community Stadium; Attendance: 9,559; Referee: Andy Woolmer

7 April 2009 41	Leyton Orient	2–2	Leeds United	Leyton
19:45 BST	Thornton 65'; Church 85'	Report	Snodgrass 19', 60' (pen.)	Stadium: Brisbane Road; Attendance: 6,943; Referee: Trevor Kettle

11 April 2009 42	Leeds United	1–0	Stockport County	Leeds
15:00 BST	Howson 9'	Report		Stadium: Elland Road; Attendance: 24,967; Referee: Phil Crossley

13 April 2009 43	Leicester City	1–0	Leeds United	Leicester
15:00 BST	Howard 90+2'	Report		Stadium: Walkers Stadium; Attendance: 27,507; Referee: Lee Mason

18 April 2009 44	Leeds United	3–1	Tranmere Rovers	Leeds
15:00 BST	Beckford 15'; Kilkenny 26'; Becchio 56'	Report	Sodje 27' (o.g.)	Stadium: Elland Road; Attendance: 24,360; Referee: Michael Oliver

25 April 2009 45	Hartlepool United	0–1	Leeds United	Hartlepool
15:00 BST		Report	Beckford 59'	Stadium: Victoria Park; Attendance: 6,402; Referee: Colin Webster

2 May 2009 46	Leeds United	3–0	Northampton Town	Leeds
15:00 BST	Becchio 44'; Beckford 59'; Snodgrass 90'	Report		Stadium: Elland Road; Attendance: 34,214; Referee: Andy Penn

==== Play-offs ====
9 May 2009 First-Leg	Millwall	1–0	Leeds United	Bermondsey
12:45 BST	Harris 71'	Report		Stadium: The Den; Attendance: 13,228; Referee: Clive Oliver

14 May 2009 Second-Leg	Leeds United	1–1 (1–2 agg.)	Millwall	Leeds
19:45 BST	Becchio 53'	Report	Abdou 74'	Stadium: Elland Road; Attendance: 37,036; Referee: Mark Halsey

=== FA Cup ===
7 November 2008 1	Leeds United	1–1	Northampton Town	Leeds
19:45 BST	Robinson 37' (pen.)	Report	McGleish 9'	Stadium: Elland Road; Attendance: 9,531; Referee: Michael Oliver

17 November 2008 Replay	Northampton Town	2–5	Leeds United	Northampton
19:45 GMT	Crowe 44', 89'	Report	Beckford 13', 45+2', 54'; Howson 28'; Parker 41'	Stadium: Sixfields Stadium; Attendance: 3,960; Referee: Phil Crossley

30 November 2008 2	Histon	1–0	Leeds United	Impington
12:15 GMT	Langston 38'	Report		Stadium: Bridge Road; Attendance: 4,301; Referee: Neil Swarbrick

=== League Cup ===
12 August 2008 1	Chester City	2–5	Leeds United	Chester
19:45 BST	Lowe 15', 75'	Report	Beckford 3', 25', 35'; Snodgrass 10'; Robinson 31'	Stadium: Deva Stadium; Attendance: 3,644; Referee: Graham Salisbury

26 August 2008 2	Leeds United	4–0	Crystal Palace	Leeds
19:45 BST	Douglas 11'; Beckford 32'; Becchio 52'; Showunmi 76'	Report		Stadium: Elland Road; Attendance: 10,765; Referee: Kevin Friend

23 September 2008 3	Leeds United	3–2	Hartlepool United	Leeds
19:45 BST	Snodgrass 14'; Showunmi 58'; Robinson 90+1'	Report	Monkhouse 2'; Porter 33'	Stadium: Elland Road; Attendance: 14,599; Referee: Andy Penn

11 November 2008 4	Derby County	2–1	Leeds United	Derby
19:45 GMT	Villa 6'; Ellington 18'	Report	Becchio 40'	Stadium: Pride Park Stadium; Attendance: 18,540; Referee: Graham Laws

=== League Trophy ===
2 September 2008 1	Leeds United	2–1	Bradford City	Leeds
19:45 BST	Robinson 7' (pen.); Becchio 50'	Report	Conlon 71'	Stadium: Elland Road; Attendance: 20,128; Referee: Anthony Taylor

8 October 2008 2	Rotherham United	4–2	Leeds United	Sheffield
19:45 BST	Sharps 17'; Hudson 44' (pen.); Broughton 48'; Fenton 53'	Report	Howson 31'; Showunmi 56'	Stadium: Don Valley Stadium; Attendance: 4,658; Referee: Scott Mathieson

== Statistics ==
No.	Pos.	Name	League		Play-offs		FA Cup		League Cup		League Trophy		Total		Discipline	
No.	Pos.	Name	Apps	Goals	Apps	Goals	Apps	Goals	Apps	Goals	Apps	Goals	Apps	Goals	Yellow card	Red card
1	GK	(Denmark) Casper Ankergren	33	0	2	0	1	0	3	0	0	0	39	0	2	0
2	DF	(England) Frazer Richardson	21+2	0	0	0	2	0	3	0	1	0	27+2	0	2	0
3	DF	(England) Paul Huntington	4	0	0	0	0	0	2	0	1	0	7	0	1	0
4	MF	(Republic of Ireland) Jonathan Douglas	42+1	1	2	0	3	0	2+1	1	0	0	49+2	2	4	0
5	DF	(Angola) Rui Marques	32	1	0	0	1	0	1	0	2	0	36	1	4	0
6	DF	(Slovakia) Ľubomír Michalík	15+4	0	0	0	3	0	3	0	1	0	22+4	0	4	1
7	MF	(England) David Prutton	8+8	0	0	0	1	0	1	0	2	0	12+8	0	3	1
8	MF	(Australia) Neil Kilkenny	27+3	4	2	0	1	0	3	0	2	0	35+3	4	4	0
9	FW	(England) Jermaine Beckford	32+2	26	2	0	1	3	2+2	4	0+1	0	37+5	33	6	1
10	FW	(Argentina) Luciano Becchio	40+5	15	2	1	2+1	0	3+1	2	0+2	0	47+9	19	7	0
11	DF	(Republic of Ireland) Alan Sheehan	11	1	0	0	1	0	1	0	0+1	0	13+1	1	1	1
12	GK	(England) David Lucas	13	0	0	0	1	0	1	0	2	0	18	0	0	0
13	FW	(United States) Mike Grella	0+11	0	0	0	0	0	0	0	0	0	0+12	0	0	0
14	MF	(England) Jonny Howson	26+14	4	2	0	2+1	0	2+2	0	2	1	34+17	5	1	1
15	MF	(England) Fabian Delph	40+2	6	2	0	2	0	3+1	0	0+1	0	47+4	6	13	0
16	MF	(England) Bradley Johnson	7+8	1	0+2	0	0	0	1+1	0	0+1	0	8+12	1	3	0
18	MF	(England) Andy Robinson	20+12	2	0+2	0	2	1	3	2	2	1	27+14	6	6	0
19	DF	(England) Ben Parker	23+1	0	2	0	2	1	2	0	1	0	30+1	1	1	0
21	FW	(Nigeria) Enoch Showunmi	3+5	2	0	0	0+3	0	1+2	2	2	1	6+10	5	0	0
22	MF	(England) Andy Hughes	18+9	0	0	0	2	0	2	0	1	0	23+9	0	0	0
23	MF	(Scotland) Robert Snodgrass	25+17	9	2	0	2	0	3	2	2	0	34+17	11	5	0
26	DF	(Nigeria) Sam Sodje	5	0	2	0	0	0	0	0	0	0	7	0	1	0
26	MF	(Scotland) Paul Telfer	14	0	0	0	2	0	2	0	0	0	18	0	1	0
27	DF	(France) Mansour Assoumani	1	0	0	0	0	0	0	0	0	0	1	0	0	0
27	FW	(England) Liam Dickinson	4+4	0	0	0	0	0	0	0	0	0	4+4	0	0	0
28	FW	(England) Malcolm Christie	1+3	1	0	0	1	0	0	0	0	0	2+3	1	0	0
31	DF	(England) Jonny Webb	0	0	0	0	0+1	0	0	0	0	0	0+1	0	0	0
32	DF	(England) Aidy White	5	0	0	0	0+1	0	1+1	0	1	0	7+2	0	1	0
35	FW	(England) Lee Trundle	7+3	1	0	0	0	0	0	0	0	0	7+3	1	0	0
36	DF	(England) Richard Naylor	22	1	2	0	0	0	0	0	0	0	24	1	3	0
38	DF	(England) Carl Dickinson	7	0	0	0	0	0	0	0	0	0	7	0	0	0

== Transfers ==
=== In ===
Date	Pos.	Name	From	Fee	Ref.
1 July 2008	FW	(England) Andrew Robinson	(Wales) Swansea City	Free	
1 July 2008	DF	(Republic of Ireland) Alan Sheehan	(England) Leicester City	Undisclosed	
8 July 2008	FW	(Nigeria) Enoch Showunmi	(England) Bristol City	Free	
25 July 2008	MF	(Scotland) Robert Snodgrass	(Scotland) Livingston	Undisclosed	
1 August 2008	FW	(Argentina) Luciano Becchio	(Spain) Mérida	£300,000	
8 August 2008	DF	(Scotland) Paul Telfer	(England) Bournemouth	Free	
18 December 2008	DF	(France) Mansour Assoumani	(Germany) Sportfreunde Siegen	Free	
2 February 2009	FW	(United States) Mike Grella	(United States) Clary Clarets	Free	
2 February 2009	DF	(England) Richard Naylor	(England) Ipswich Town	Free	

=== Out ===
Date	Pos.	Name	To	Fee	Ref.
28 May 2008	MF	(England) Alan Thompson	Retired		
1 July 2008	DF	(England) Darren Kenton	Unattached	Released	
2 July 2008	FW	(England) Leon Constantine	(England) Northampton Town	Free	
22 July 2008	FW	(England) Tomi Ameobi	(England) Doncaster Rovers	£30,000	
24 July 2008	FW	(England) Anthony Elding	(England) Crewe Alexandra	£160,000	
11 August 2008	MF	(Finland) Sebastian Sorsa	(Scotland) Hamilton Academical	Free	
26 August 2008	MF	(Republic of Ireland) Robert Bayly	Unattached	Released	
28 August 2008	MF	(England) Curtis Weston	(England) Gillingham	Free	
1 September 2008	MF	(France) Sébastien Carole	Unattached	Released	
17 January 2009	DF	(France) Mansour Assoumani	(Wales) Wrexham	Free	
24 January 2009	MF	(England) Ian Westlake	(England) Cheltenham Town	Free	
30 January 2009	DF	(England) Scott Gardner	(England) Mansfield Town	Free	
31 January 2009	FW	(England) Malcolm Christie	Unattached	Released	
2 February 2009	DF	(Scotland) Paul Telfer	Unattached	Released	

=== Loan in ===
Date from	Date to	Pos.	Name	From	Ref.
9 January 2009	11 March 2009	FW	(England) Lee Trundle	(England) Bristol City	
14 January 2009	2 February 2009	DF	(England) Richard Naylor	(England) Ipswich Town	
15 January 2009	18 February 2009	FW	(England) Carl Dickinson	(England) Stoke City	
13 March 2009	14 May 2009	FW	(England) Liam Dickinson	(England) Derby County	
26 March 2009	14 May 2009	DF	(Nigeria) Sam Sodje	(England) Reading	
26 March 2009	14 May 2009	GK	(England) Darryl Flahavan	(England) Crystal Palace	

=== Loan out ===
Date from	Date to	Pos.	Name	To	Ref.
1 August 2008	27 August 2008	MF	(England) Curtis Weston	(England) Gillingham	
7 August 2008	28 January 2009	FW	(Democratic Republic of the Congo) Trésor Kandol	(England) Millwall	
19 September 2008	21 October 2008	DF	(England) Scott Gardner	(England) Farsley Celtic	
24 September 2008	2 May 2009	GK	(Scotland) Alan Martin	(England) Barrow	
24 October 2008	24 January 2009	MF	(England) Ian Westlake	(England) Cheltenham Town	
28 October 2008	3 January 2009	MF	(England) Bradley Johnson	(England) Brighton & Hove Albion	
27 January 2009	26 February 2009	FW	(England) Tom Elliott	(England) Macclesfield Town	
30 January 2009	3 May 2009	FW	(Democratic Republic of the Congo) Trésor Kandol	(England) Charlton Athletic	
27 February 2009	2 May 2009	DF	(England) Jonathan Webb	(England) Newcastle Blue Star	
20 March 2009	2 May 2009	MF	(Scotland) Peter Sweeney	(England) Grimsby Town	
23 March 2009	2 May 2009	DF	(Republic of Ireland) Alan Sheehan	(England) Crewe Alexandra	
