= Owain Tudur Jones =

Welsh footballer (born 1984)

Personal information
- Date of birth: 15 October 1984 (age 42)
- Place of birth: Bangor, Wales
- Position: Defensive midfielder

Team information
- Current team: Wales C (assistant manager)

Senior career*
Years	Team	Apps	(Gls)
2000–2001	Porthmadog	10	(0)
2001–2005	Bangor City	96	(24)
2005–2009	Swansea City	44	(3)
2009	→ Swindon Town (loan)	11	(1)
2009–2011	Norwich City	5	(1)
2010	→ Yeovil Town (loan)	6	(1)
2010	→ Yeovil Town (loan)	14	(1)
2011	→ Brentford (loan)	6	(0)
2011–2013	Inverness Caledonian Thistle	48	(2)
2013–2014	Hibernian	14	(0)
2014	Falkirk	4	(0)
Total		258	(33)

International career
2005–2006	Wales U21	3	(0)
2008–2013	Wales	7	(0)
- * Club domestic league appearances and goals

Owain Tudur Jones (born 15 October 1984) is a Welsh former footballer who played as a defensive midfielder. He represented the Wales national football team and during his club career he played for Porthmadog, Bangor City, Swansea City, Swindon Town, Norwich City, Yeovil Town, Brentford, Inverness Caledonian Thistle, Hibernian and Falkirk.

Jones is currently the assistant manager of Wales C. He is also a presenter for the Welsh football show Sgorio and Welsh magazine show Heno, and also commentates for TNT Sports.

== Club career ==
Born in Bangor, Gwynedd, Jones joined Bangor City from Cymru Alliance club Porthmadog during the summer of 2001. In four seasons, Jones was in the Citizens' team that lost the 2002 Welsh Cup Final to Barry Town at Park Avenue, Aberystwyth. He also played in the UEFA Cup against Sartid Smederevo of Serbia in 2002 and in the UEFA Intertoto Cup in June 2003 against Romanian side Gloria Bistriţa.

=== Swansea City ===
Jones signed for Swansea City from Bangor City for a fee of £5,000 prior to the 2005–06 season after a successful trial period. He was offered a new two-year contract with Swansea in October, which he signed in November. During his first full season as a professional he made 21 league appearances, scoring three goals. He also made his debut for the Welsh Under-21 side and at the end of the season also received a call up to the full international squad. On 19 December 2006 it was announced that Jones would travel to the United States to see surgeon Dr. Richard Steadman for a second opinion on his ongoing knee problem.

After spending the second half of the 2008–09 season on loan at Swindon Town, he joined League One team Norwich City on a three-year contract on 16 June 2009. Due to Swansea City having a one-year option on Jones' contract, the fee of £250,000 was agreed between the two clubs – said to include add-ons dependent upon both the club's and Jones' future success.

=== Norwich City ===
Jones signed for Norwich City in 2009 for a fee of £250,000, he made his debut in the 7–1 defeat to Colchester on the opening day of the season. He scored his first goal for Norwich in a defeat at Brentford on 18 August 2009. He joined Yeovil Town on a month's loan on 27 January 2010.

Once his loan at Yeovil Town had expired, Jones began training with Plymouth Argyle from 1 August 2010. The following day he made his debut against amateur side Saltash United. Jones scored the third goal for Argyle in their 8–0 thrashing. However, it was later announced that completion of the loan signing had stalled.

Jones agreed a second loan deal with Yeovil Town on 27 August 2010. His loan spell was extended by a month on 22 October 2010. After returning from his three-month loan spell at Yeovil, Jones made a return to the Norwich City bench in the 2–1 away win over Derby County, even making a late substitute appearance coming on for Henri Lansbury. On 21 January 2011, Jones joined Brentford on a month's loan.

=== Inverness Caledonian Thistle ===
On 28 July 2011, Jones signed for Inverness Caledonian Thistle on a one-year deal. Inverness manager Terry Butcher was excited about the midfield presence the Welsh international could bring to the team. He made his debut in a 1–0 home loss to Hibs. Soon afterwards he suffered a knee cartilage injury, requiring surgery. He missed six months of the 2011–12 Scottish Premier League season due to the injury, but agreed a new contract with Inverness in June 2012.

=== Hibernian ===
On 31 May 2013, Jones agreed a two-year deal to join Hibernian. On 1 September 2014, he was released by Hibernian.

=== Falkirk ===
Three days after leaving Hibernian, Jones signed a two-year contract with Falkirk.

After only making a handful of appearances, Jones once again injured the knee which had been causing him problems throughout his career. On 6 March 2015, via Twitter, Jones announced that he had retired from playing professional football after choosing to take up medical advice he had been given.

== International career ==
Jones represented Wales four times at Under-19 level and made three appearances at Under-21 level. He made his international debut for Wales in a 2–0 win against Luxembourg on 26 March 2008. Jones was recalled to the Wales squad in October 2013, after 10 players withdrew due to injury.

== Coaching career ==
Jones is currently assistant manager of Wales C.

== Career statistics ==
=== Club ===
Appearances and goals by club, season and competition
Club	Season	League			National Cup		League Cup		Other		Total	
Club	Season	Division	Apps	Goals	Apps	Goals	Apps	Goals	Apps	Goals	Apps	Goals
Swansea City	2005–06	League One	24	3	1	0	1	0	3 (Note: Appearances in Football League Trophy)	0	29	3
Swansea City	2006–07	League One	3	0	0	0	0	0	2	1	5	1
Swansea City	2007–08	League One	8	0	0	0	0	0	0	0	8	0
Swansea City	2008–09	Championship	9	0	2	0	3	0	—		14	0
Swansea City	Total		44	3	3	0	4	0	5	1	56	4
Swindon Town (loan)	2008–09	League One	11	1	0	0	0	0	0	0	11	1
Norwich City	2009–10	League One	3	1	1	0	1	0	1	0	6	1
Norwich City	2010–11	Championship	2	0	0	0	0	0	—		2	0
Norwich City	Total		5	1	1	0	1	0	1	0	8	1
Yeovil Town (loan)	2009–10	League One	6	1	0	0	0	0	0	0	6	1
Yeovil Town (loan)	2010–11	League One	14	1	1	0	0	0	1	0	16	1
Yeovil Town (loan)	Total		20	1	1	0	0	0	1	0	22	1
Brentford (loan)	2010–11	League One	6	0	0	0	0	0	0	0	6	0
Inverness Caledonian Thistle	2011–12	SPL	15	0	0	0	0	0	—		15	0
Inverness Caledonian Thistle	2012–13	SPL	33	3	3	0	3	0	—		39	3
Inverness Caledonian Thistle	Total		48	3	3	0	3	0	—		54	3
Hibernian	2013–14	Scottish Premiership	14	0	1	0	0	0	3 (Note: Appearances in UEFA Europa League)	0	18	0
Hibernian	2014–15	Scottish Championship	0	0	0	0	0	0	1 (Note: Appearances in Scottish Challenge Cup)	0	1	0
Hibernian	Total		14	0	1	0	0	0	4	0	19	0
Falkirk	2014–15	Scottish Championship	4	0	0	0	1	0	0	0	5	0
Career total			152	8	9	0	9	0	11	1	181	10

=== International ===
Appearances and goals by national team and year
National team	Year	Apps	Goals
Wales	2008	3	0
Wales	2009	1	0
Wales	2011	2	0
Wales	2013	1	0
Total		7	0

== Honours ==
Swansea City

- Football League Trophy: 2005–06

Individual

- Welsh Premier League Team of the Year: 2004–05
