= Andrew Smart =

English footballer

Personal information
- Full name: Andrew James Smart
- Date of birth: 17 March 1986 (age 40)
- Place of birth: Wythenshawe, Manchester, England
- Positions: Defender; midfielder

Youth career
- 2003–2005: Macclesfield Town

Senior career*
Years	Team	Apps	(Gls)
2005–2007	Macclesfield Town	9	(0)
2007	→ Northwich Victoria (loan)	18	(1)
2007–2010	Stalybridge Celtic	90	(15)
2010–2011	Hyde	36	(7)
2011–2012	Trafford	?	(?)
2012	Altrincham	7	(0)
2012–2014	Trafford	?	(?)
2014	Salford City	3	(0)
2014–2015	Trafford	?	(?)
2015	Glossop North End	13	(0)
2016	Ramsbottom United	?	(?)
- * Club domestic league appearances and goals as of 13 February 2016

Andrew James Smart (born 17 March 1986) is an English footballer who last played for Ramsbottom United. He has previously played for Macclesfield Town in the Football League.

== Career ==
=== Macclesfield Town ===
Born in Wythenshawe, Manchester, Smart came from the youth system at Macclesfield Town and in 2005 he made it into the first team squad. He stayed there for two-years making only nine appearances and not scoring. In 2007, he went out on loan to Northwich Victoria making 18 appearances scoring 1 goal. He was released on his return to Macclesfield.

=== Stalybridge Celtic ===
After his release from Macclesfield Town he joined Conference North side Stalybridge Celtic and he stayed there for two-years where he was more of a first team regular making almost 100 league appearances for them before his move to Hyde.

=== Hyde ===
On 2 July 2010, Smart completed his move to Hyde. He made his debut on 17 July 2010, in a 2–0 pre-season defeat to Manchester City Reserves. He scored his first goal for Hyde on 21 August 2010, in a 5–1 defeat to Alfreton Town. He made it two Hyde goals four days later when he converted penalty in the 3–1 defeat to local rivals Droylsden. In April 2011, he was awarded with the Jack Harrop trophy for leading scorer, after he finished as Hyde's top goalscorer for the 2010–11 season.

He left Hyde during the summer of 2011 as part of a mass clear out at the club. He joined Trafford.FC, before signing for Altrincham in March 2012. He rejoined Trafford for the start of the 2012–2013 season.

In the summer of 2014 he moved to Salford City. He made his club debut in the opening league match of the season on 16 August as Salford beat Scarborough Athletic 4–1. In September 2014 he rejoined Trafford.

He joined Ramsbottom United in 2016 from Glossop North End.
