= 2005–06 Football League Trophy =

LDV Vans Trophy

Tournament details
- Country: England; Wales
- Teams: 60

Final positions
- Champions: Swansea City
- Runners-up: Carlisle United

Tournament statistics
- Matches played: 61
- Goals scored: 197 (3.23 per match)
- Top goal scorer(s): Adebayo Akinfenwa; Andy Robinson (5 goals)

The 2005–06 Football League Trophy, known as the LDV Vans Trophy for sponsorship reasons, was the 25th season in the history of the competition. A straight knockout competition for English football clubs in the third and fourth tiers of the English football league system.

In all, 60 clubs entered the competition. It was split into two sections, Northern and Southern, with the winners of each section contesting the final at the Millennium Stadium, Cardiff. The competition began on 18 October 2005 and concluded on 2 April 2006.

The 2006 final was branded simply as the Football League Trophy after the new owners of LDV withdrew sponsorship of the competition in March 2006 due to the company entering administration, also meaning no prize money was awarded to the winners.

Wrexham were the defending champions, but lost to Blackpool in the first round.

The winners were Swansea City, who defeated Carlisle United 2–1.

== First round ==
The First Round ties took place on 18 and 19 October 2005. Four clubs received a bye into the Second Round. Bradford City and Port Vale in the Northern section, and Colchester United and Walsall in the Southern section.

=== Northern section ===
Tie no.	Home team	Score	Away team	Attendance
1	Barnsley	2–5	Doncaster Rovers	4,095
2	Blackpool	4–3	Wrexham	3,239
3	Cambridge United	3–0	Chester City	1,224
4	Grimsby Town	1–1	Morecambe	1,131
Morecambe won 4–3 on penalties
5	Halifax Town	6–1	Bury	1,191
6	Kidderminster Harriers	2–1	Darlington	696
7	Macclesfield Town	2–0	Chesterfield	796
8	Mansfield Town	0–1	Hereford United	1,393
9	Oldham Athletic	1–1	Carlisle United	2,226
Carlisle United won 6–5 on penalties
10	Rochdale	3–1	Stockport County	1,683
11	Rotherham United	3–3	Accrington Stanley	1,888
Rotherham United won 3–2 on penalties
12	Scunthorpe United	1–0	Hartlepool United	2,028
13	Tranmere Rovers	2–1	Lincoln City	3,210
14	Boston United	2–1	Huddersfield Town	1,593

=== Southern section ===
Tie no.	Home team	Score	Away team	Attendance
1	Barnet	3–2	Bristol City	1,031
2	Bournemouth	4–1	Aldershot Town	2,657
3	Brentford	1–1	Oxford United	1,785
Oxford United won 4–3 on penalties
4	Gillingham	2–0	Crawley Town	1,988
5	Leyton Orient	2–0	Yeovil Town	958
6	MK Dons	3–2	Exeter City	2,745
7	Northampton Town	5–2	Notts County	2,041
8	Peterborough United	2–1	Bristol Rovers	1,477
9	Rushden & Diamonds	1–0	Southend United	1,300
10	Shrewsbury Town	0–2	Cheltenham Town	2,146
11	Swindon Town	2–0	Stevenage Borough	1,771
12	Torquay United	1–3	Swansea City	1,025
13	Woking	3–2	Nottingham Forest	3,127
14	Wycombe Wanderers	2–1	Dagenham & Redbridge	1,094

== Second round ==
The Second Round ties took place on 22 and 23 November 2005. The Woking vs. Cheltenham Town match was abandoned with the scores at 2–1 to Cheltenham due to heavy fog after 50 minutes. The game was eventually played on 28 November 2005, with Cheltenham triumphing 5–1 in extra time. The Halifax vs. Scunthorpe United game was additionally postponed until 13 December 2005 due to bad weather conditions.

=== Northern section ===
Tie no.	Home team	Score	Away team	Attendance
1	Cambridge United	3–2	Doncaster Rovers	1,435
2	Carlisle United	2–1	Blackpool	2,987
3	Hereford United	2–1	Port Vale	1,355
4	Morecambe	0–1	Bradford City	1,649
5	Rotherham United	1–2	Macclesfield Town	1,646
6	Tranmere Rovers	3–2	Rochdale	2,867
7	Boston United	0–3	Kidderminster Harriers	1,131
8	Halifax Town	1–3	Scunthorpe United	1,124

=== Southern section ===
Tie no.	Home team	Score	Away team	Attendance
1	Barnet	0–3	MK Dons	991
2	Gillingham	2–2	Wycombe Wanderers	2,111
Wycombe Wanderers won 3–1 on penalties
3	Peterborough United	2–1	Swindon Town	959
4	Swansea City	4–0	Rushden & Diamonds	5,321
5	Walsall	1–0	Bournemouth	2,031
6	Colchester United	3–2	Northampton Town	1,719
7	Oxford United	1–0	Leyton Orient	1,521
8	Woking	1–5	Cheltenham Town	883

== Quarter finals ==
The Quarter final ties took place on 13 and 20 December 2005.

=== Northern section ===
Tie no.	Home team	Score	Away team	Attendance
1	Macclesfield Town	4–2	Cambridge United	860
2	Hereford United	2–0	Scunthorpe United	1,452
3	Kidderminster Harriers	2–1	Bradford City	1,276
4	Tranmere Rovers	0–0	Carlisle United	3,054
Carlisle United won 11–10 on penalties

=== Southern section ===
Tie no.	Home team	Score	Away team	Attendance
1	Swansea City	3–1	Peterborough United	5,474
2	Cheltenham Town	2–1	Oxford United	1,825
3	MK Dons	1–2	Colchester United	2,649
4	Walsall	3–2	Wycombe Wanderers	2,571

== Semi finals ==
The Semi final ties took place on 24 January 2006.

=== Northern section ===
Tie no.	Home team	Score	Away team	Attendance
1	Carlisle United	1–0	Kidderminster Harriers	4,432
2	Macclesfield Town	2–0	Hereford United	1,315

=== Southern section ===
Tie no.	Home team	Score	Away team	Attendance
1	Cheltenham Town	0–1	Colchester United	2,243
2	Swansea City	2–2	Walsall	6,670
Swansea City won 6–5 on penalties

== Area Finals ==
=== Northern section ===
21 February 2006
19:45
First leg

Carlisle United	2–1	Macclesfield Town
Hawley 20'; Murphy 90'	Report	Smart 9'

Brunton Park, Carlisle
Attendance: 5,706
Referee: N. Miller

7 March 2006
19:45
Second leg

Macclesfield Town	3–2 (a.e.t.)	Carlisle United
Teague 4'; McNeil 28'; Townson 120'	Report	Hawley 42'; Grand 109'

Moss Rose, Macclesfield
Attendance: 3,598
Referee: M. Thorpe

=== Southern Section ===
2006-03-07
19:45
First leg

Swansea City	1 – 0	Colchester United
Akinfenwa 40'	Report

Liberty Stadium, Swansea
Attendance: 7,285
Referee: P. Taylor

2006-03-14
19:45
Second leg

Colchester United	1 – 2	Swansea City
Danns 46'	Report	Britton 52'; Knight 56'

Layer Road, Colchester
Attendance: 3,236
Referee: P. Crossley

== Final ==
2006-04-02
13:00

Carlisle United	1 – 2	Swansea City
A. Murray 40'	Report	Trundle 3'; Akinfenwa 81'

Millennium Stadium, Cardiff
Attendance: 42,028
Referee: A. Leake
