= Lee Trundle =

British footballer

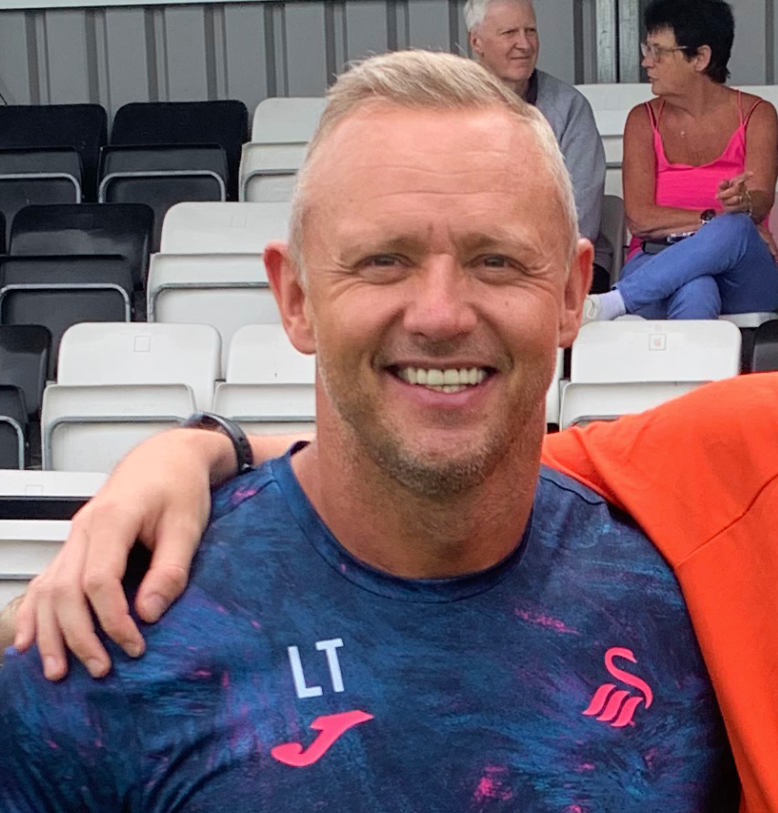
- Trundle in 2023

Personal information
- Full name: Lee Christopher Trundle
- Date of birth: 10 October 1976 (age 50)
- Place of birth: Liverpool, England
- Position: Forward

Team information
- Current team: Cwmbrân Town

Senior career*
Years	Team	Apps	(Gls)
1995	Burscough	10	(5)
1995–1997	Chorley	66	(21)
1997–1998	Stalybridge Celtic	37	(10)
1998–2000	Southport	38	(8)
1999	→ Bamber Bridge (loan)	10	(11)
2000–2001	Rhyl	18	(15)
2001–2003	Wrexham	94	(27)
2003–2007	Swansea City	146	(78)
2007–2010	Bristol City	53	(7)
2009	→ Leeds United (loan)	10	(1)
2009–2010	→ Swansea City (loan)	20	(5)
2010–2012	Neath	59	(26)
2012–2013	Preston North End	1	(0)
2013	Chester	3	(0)
2013	Marine	3	(1)
2016–2018	Llanelli Town	45	(68)
2018	Haverfordwest County	18	(12)
2019	Trefelin BGC	12	(14)
2019–2023	Ammanford	63	(29)
2023–2024	Mumbles Rangers	8	(3)
2024–2025	Trefelin BGC	27	(19)
2025–2026	Pure Swansea	10	(2)
2026–	Cwmbrân Town	4	(1)
- * Club domestic league appearances and goals as of 10:54, 16 November 2026 (UTC)

Lee Christopher Trundle (born 10 October 1976) is an English footballer who plays as a striker for Cwmbrân Town. He also works as the club ambassador and youth team coach for Championship side Swansea City.

Trundle's career began in the English non-league system, where he played for Burscough, Chorley, Stalybridge Celtic, Southport and Bamber Bridge, before signing for Welsh Premier League side Rhyl. He managed to net 15 goals in 18 matches for Rhyl, and his performances earned him a move to Football League side Wrexham in 2001. Trundle made a name for himself in professional football during a four-year spell for Swansea City, where he scored 78 goals in 146 appearances between 2003 and 2007. In July 2007, he left Swansea and signed with Bristol City, though he only scored eight times in three seasons and was loaned out to both Leeds United and back to Swansea.

In 2010, following his release from Bristol City, Trundle returned to the top tier of Welsh football and signed for Neath. He spent two years with the club, scoring 26 goals in 59 matches, but found himself a free agent once more when Neath were liquidated in 2012. In a surprise move, Trundle rejoined the Football League in the summer of 2012 at the age of 35, signing for League One side Preston North End. However, a lengthy injury saw him lose out on a first team position, and he left Preston in February 2013 through a mutual termination of his contract. Stints with non-league clubs Chester and Marine followed before Trundle retired from football at the age of 36. However, in August 2016, he came out of retirement to sign for Welsh Division Two club Llanelli Town, scoring 86 goals in 59 appearances during back-to-back promotions. In May 2018, Trundle signed for Welsh Division One side Haverfordwest County on a week-by-week basis.

== Early life ==
Born in Liverpool, Trundle attended St Edmund of Canterbury Catholic High School in Huyton.

== Playing career ==
=== Early career ===
Trundle was a late entrant into professional and league football, playing for non-league teams Burscough, Stalybridge Celtic, Southport, Bamber Bridge and Chorley before joining Welsh Premier League club Rhyl in 2000.

=== Wrexham ===
Within six months, he had been snapped up by Brian Flynn to play for Wrexham where he played 78 matches (plus a further 24 as substitute) in all competitions and scored 30 goals in a little over two years. A goalscoring account which was started by a bicycle kick to start a second half comeback from 2–0 which culminated in a 3–2 victory for Wrexham against Walsall on 24 February 2001.

=== Swansea City ===
In the summer of 2003, Trundle received a free transfer and moved south to link up with Flynn who had now become manager of Swansea City. Brian Horton had attempted to sign him for Port Vale, though was unable to after the club were placed under a transfer embargo. He instantly became a North Bank favourite with his goalscoring exploits and extraordinary tricks, scoring on his debut at the Vetch against Bury, and netting his first hat-trick for the club in the following match at Cheltenham, becoming the last of the three Swansea players who scored hat-tricks in three consecutive league matches (after James Thomas and Brad Maylett), the only time this has happened for the club. Trundle scored 78 goals in 146 appearances for Swansea, making it by far the most prolific period of his career.

In his time at Swansea, Trundle became a minor celebrity in the game, with his extrovert displays of skill (or "showboating") bringing him to national attention via the Soccer AM television show on Sky Sports. Tim Lovejoy revealed in his autobiography that Trundle himself regularly contacted the show with footage of himself in action.

In October 2005, he was the subject of a £750,000 transfer bid by Sheffield Wednesday which Swansea rejected. Days later, he signed an image rights contract with his club which offered a portion of revenues from merchandise featuring his image. He was the first player outside the Premier League to do so.

=== Bristol City ===
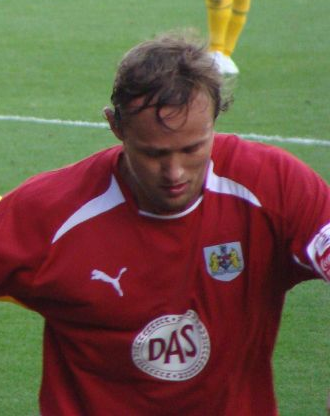
Trundle playing for Bristol City in 2008

Despite the best efforts of Swansea City, Trundle agreed to sign for Bristol City on 27 July 2007, although the deal was not officially completed until 30 July due to an administrative error. He was given permission by Swansea and the Welsh FA to play in Bristol City's pre-season friendly against Yeovil Town before he officially completed the deal, scoring and providing an assist in a 2–2 draw at Ashton Gate. Bristol City made four offers for the striker. Their final offer of £1,000,000 was accepted after Trundle handed in a transfer request. Trundle scored his first goals, a brace, for Bristol City against Scunthorpe on 25 August 2007.

=== Leeds United ===
Trundle joined Leeds United on a one-month loan on 9 January 2009 and was allocated the number 35 shirt. Former Swansea teammate Andy Robinson played a big part in recommending Leeds to Trundle. He made his debut for Leeds as a second-half substitute in the 2–0 loss to Carlisle United at Elland Road. He scored his only goal for the club on his first starting appearance, in a 2–0 win at Brighton on 17 January. Leeds extended Trundle's stay at Elland Road for a further month, but his loan expired on 10 March 2009 and he returned to Bristol City.

=== Return to Swansea ===
On 27 August 2009, Trundle joined his former club Swansea City on loan until 1 January 2010 and this was later extended till the end of the season. Trundle played 20 league games and scored five goals in just two starts. Since Trundle rejoined Swansea, he failed to play a full 90 minutes. Trundle made no secret that he wanted to earn a permanent deal and wanted to end his career at Swansea City. He was not offered a playing contract by the club but was offered a coaching role. Trundle subsequently refused the role.

=== Neath ===
In July 2010, Trundle returned to the Welsh Premier League with Neath, making his debut for the club on the opening day of the 2010–11 season in a 2–1 defeat to Bangor City.

Neath were wound up at the end of the 2011–12 season due to ongoing financial problems, leaving Trundle without a club.

=== Preston North End ===
On 20 July 2012, Trundle signed a one-year deal with Preston North End. Trundle had impressed on trial at Deepdale after being invited to join up with the club for pre-season training. The 35-year-old featured for North End in their pre-season friendlies against Southport and Chorley and scored a superb solo goal in the draw against Chorley. However, shortly after signing for the Lilywhites, it was announced he had suffered a knee injury which manager Graham Westley believed would keep Trundle out for around four months. On 1 December, he appeared on the bench for a Second Round FA Cup tie at home against Gillingham, and he came off the bench in injury time during the 2–0 win for the Lilywhites.

He left Preston on 8 February through a mutual termination of his contract.

=== Chester ===
It was announced on 18 February 2013 that the 36-year-old signed for Conference North side Chester until the end of the 2012–2013 season.

=== Marine ===
On 28 March 2013, Northern Premier League side Marine confirmed that they had completed the signing of Trundle for an undisclosed fee. On 30 March 2013, he scored on his debut on against Nantwich Town. All three games he appeared in were played at home. Trundle left Marine and retired from competitive football at the end of the season.

=== Llanelli Town ===
On 21 August 2016, Trundle came out of retirement to sign for Welsh Football League Division Two club Llanelli Town. On 27 August 2016, he scored a hat-trick on his debut in a 3–2 win against Aberdare Town. This was the first of nine hat-tricks across the season in all competitions for the veteran striker, as Llanelli went on to lift both the Division Two title and the Welsh Football League Challenge Cup. Trundle continued his impressive form in his second season at the club, scoring 33 goals in 28 appearances across all competitions as Llanelli won the Division One title by 15 points. However, the team missed out on a 'double-double' by losing 2–1 to third-tier Trefelin BGC in the final of the Welsh Football League Challenge Cup. Following Llanelli's promotion to the Welsh Premier League, Trundle announced on Twitter that he would be leaving the club as his work commitments as club ambassador for Swansea City would prevent him from travelling to away games further afield.

=== Haverfordwest County ===
On 29 May 2018, Welsh Division One side Haverfordwest County announced that Trundle had agreed to join them for the 2018–19 season. He made his debut for the club on 18 August 2018, scoring four goals in a 10–1 home win over Pontypridd Town. Trundle left the club in December 2018 due to work commitments, having scored 12 goals before his departure.

=== Trefelin BGC ===
In December 2018, Trundle signed for Welsh Division Three side Trefelin BGC. Trundle had previously represented Trefelin's veterans' team. He scored on his debut against Trethomas Bluebirds.

=== Ammanford ===
In June 2019 he joined Ammanford.

=== Mumbles Rangers ===
On 12 June 2023, after playing for Wrexham's side in The Soccer Tournament in the United States, he signed for Mumbles Rangers.

=== Pure Swansea ===
Ahead of the 2025–26 season, after a season playing at Trefelin BGC, Trundle signed for Pure Swansea.

=== Cwmbrân Town ===
In June 2026 it was announced that he had signed for Cwmbrân Town ahead of the 2026–27 season.

== Coaching career ==
On 25 June 2013, it was confirmed that Trundle was to return to Swansea City, to take on the role as the first official club ambassador and a coach for the 9- to 19-year-olds.

== Personal life ==
Trundle has been an Everton fan since he was a child.

Trundle has had issues with domestic violence and the police during a troubled period during his early career. He was arrested at his home following allegations of assault and threats to kill his ex partner.

In March 2007, Trundle moved in with pop singer and Atomic Kitten star Liz McClarnon. The couple split in November 2007.

Trundle also performed 'Let it Snow' for Preston's 2012 Christmas light switch on, before turning on the lights alongside singers, Matt Cardle and Russell Watson.

== Career statistics ==
Appearances and goals by club, season and competition
Club	Season	League			National cup (Note: Includes FA Cup, Welsh Cup.)		League cup (Note: Includes Football League Cup.)		Europe		Other		Total	
Club	Season	Division	Apps	Goals	Apps	Goals	Apps	Goals	Apps	Goals	Apps	Goals	Apps	Goals
Burscough	1995–96	North West Counties Football League First Division	10	5	—		—		—		—		10	5
Chorley	1995–96	Northern Premier League Premier Division	31	8	—		—		—		—		31	8
Chorley	1996–97	Northern Premier League Premier Division	35	13	—		—		—		—		35	13
Chorley	Total		66	21	0	0	0	0	0	0	0	0	66	21
Stalybridge Celtic	1997–98	Conference National	28	10	—		—		—		—		28	10
Stalybridge Celtic	1998–99	Northern Premier League Premier Division	24	15	—		—		—		—		24	15
Stalybridge Celtic	Total		52	25	0	0	0	0	0	0	0	0	52	25
Southport	1998–99	Conference National	29	6	—		—		—		—		29	6
Southport	1999–2000	Conference National	9	2	—		—		—		—		9	2
Southport	Total		38	6	0	0	0	0	0	0	0	0	38	6
Bamber Bridge (loan)	1999–2000	Northern Premier League Premier Division	10	11	—		—		—		—		10	11
Rhyl	2000–01	League of Wales	18	15	—		—		—		—		18	15
Wrexham	2000–01	Second Division	14	8	—		—		—		—		14	8
Wrexham	2001–02	Second Division	36	8	—		—		—		2 (Note: Appearances in Football League Trophy)	2	38	10
Wrexham	2002–03	Third Division	44	11	1	0	2	0	—		3	1	50	12
Wrexham	Total		94	27	1	0	2	0	0	0	5	3	102	30
Swansea City	2003–04	Third Division	31	17	5	5	1	0	—		1	0	38	22
Swansea City	2004–05	League Two	42	22	5	1	1	0	—		1	0	49	23
Swansea City	2005–06	League One	39 (Note: Includes appearances English Football League play-offs)	20	1	0	—		—		6	1	46	21
Swansea City	2006–07	League One	34	19	3	1	1	0	—		2	0	40	20
Swansea City	Total		146	78	14	7	3	0	0	0	10	1	173	86
Bristol City	2007–08	Championship	38	6	1	0	2	0	—		—		41	6
Bristol City	2008–09	Championship	19	2	—		2	0	—		—		21	2
Bristol City	Total		57	8	1	0	4	0	0	0	0	0	62	8
Leeds United (loan)	2008–09	League One	10	1	—		—		—		—		10	1
Swansea City (loan)	2009–10	Championship	20	5	1	0	—		—		—		21	5
Neath	2010–11	Welsh Premier League	29	18	1	0	2	0	—		—		32	18
Neath	2011–12	Welsh Premier League	30	8	—		—		2	1	—		32	9
Neath	Total		59	26	1	0	2	0	2	1	0	0	64	27
Preston North End	2012–13	League One	1	0	1	0	—		—		—		2	0
Marine	2012–13	Northern Premier League Premier Division	—		—		—		—		—		–	
Brunswick United	2013–14	Swansea Senior League	0	0										
Llanelli Town	2016–17	Welsh Football League Division Two	23	45	5	6	—		—		3 (Note: Appearances in Welsh Football League Challenge Cup)	2	31	53
Llanelli Town	2017–18	Welsh Football League Division One	22	23	1	4	—		—		5	6	28	33
Llanelli Town	Total		45	68	6	10	0	0	0	0	8	8	59	86
Haverfordwest County	2018–19	Welsh Football League Division One	4	6	0	0	1	1	—		1	1	6	8
Career total			633	307	24	17	12	1	2	1	25	16	694	339

== Honours ==
Wrexham

- FAW Premier Cup: 2000–01, 2002–03

Swansea City

- Football League Trophy: 2005–06
- FAW Premier Cup: 2004–05, 2005–06

Llanelli Town

- Welsh Football League Division One: 2017–18
- Welsh Football League Division Two: 2016–17
- Welsh Football League Challenge Cup: 2016–17

Trefelin BGC

- Welsh Blood Service League Cup: 2024–25

Individual

- PFA Team of the Year: 2003–04 Third Division, 2004–05 Football League Two, 2005–06 Football League One
