= 2004–05 FAW Premier Cup =

Tournament details
- Country: England; Wales
- Teams: 16

Final positions
- Champions: Swansea City
- Runner-up: Wrexham

Tournament statistics
- Matches played: 15

The 2004–05 FAW Premier Cup was the eighth season of the tournament since its founding in 1997.

== First round ==
Home	Score	Away
Caernarfon Town	1 – 0	Caersws
Connah's Quay Nomads	2 – 1	Merthyr Tydfil
Newtown	0 – 4	Bangor City
Port Talbot Town	3 – 2	Cwmbran Town

== Second round ==
Home	Score	Away
Bangor City	3 – 0	Connah's Quay Nomads
Port Talbot Town	1 – 2	Haverfordwest County
Caernarfon Town	1 – 0	Newport County
Total Network Solutions	2 – 1	AberystwythTown

== Quarter finals ==
Home	Score	Away
Haverfordwest County	1 – 2	Wrexham
Bangor City	1 – 0	Cardiff City
Caernarfon Town	0 – 5	Swansea City
Total Network Solutions	2 – 1	Rhyl

== Semi finals ==
Home	Score	Away
Bangor City	1 – 2	Wrexham
Total Network Solutions	1 – 1	Swansea City

== Final ==
Home	Score	Away
Swansea City	2 – 1	Wrexham
