= Alan Tate =

English footballer (born 1982)

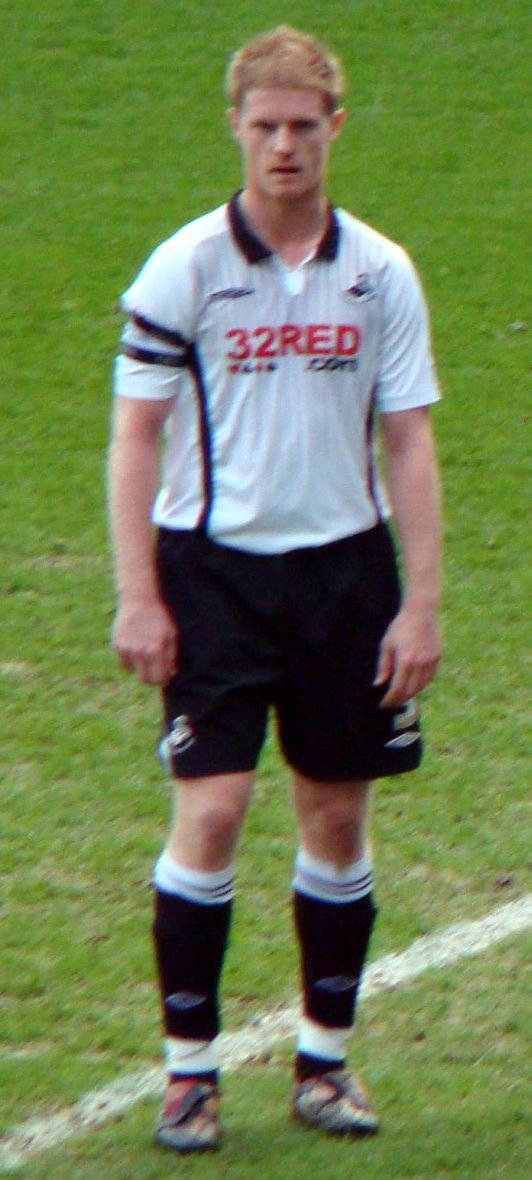
- Tate playing for Swansea City in 2010

Personal information
- Full name: Alan Tate
- Date of birth: 2 September 1982 (age 44)
- Place of birth: Easington, England
- Height: 6 ft 1 in (1.85 m)
- Position: Defender

Senior career*
Years	Team	Apps	(Gls)
2000–2004	Manchester United	0	(0)
2001–2002	→ Royal Antwerp (loan)	7	(0)
2002–2003	→ Swansea City (loan)	27	(0)
2003	→ Swansea City (loan)	9	(0)
2004–2015	Swansea City	257	(5)
2012–2013	→ Leeds United (loan)	10	(0)
2013	→ Yeovil Town (loan)	4	(0)
2014	→ Aberdeen (loan)	7	(0)
2014–2015	→ Crewe Alexandra (loan)	26	(0)
2015–2016	Port Talbot Town	9	(0)
Total		356	(5)

Managerial career
- 2021: Swansea City (caretaker)
- 2021–2023: Nottingham Forest (assistant)
- 2024: Leicester City (assistant)
- 2025–: Brøndby (assistant)
- * Club domestic league appearances and goals

Alan Tate (born 2 September 1982) is an English professional football coach and retired footballer who is the assistant manager of Danish Superliga club Brøndby.

A former defender, Tate spent the majority of his playing career at Swansea City. After retiring from playing, Tate moved into coaching with Swansea, before joining Nottingham Forest in 2021, before leaving with Steve Cooper in December 2023.

== Playing career ==
Born in Easington, County Durham, Tate began his career as a trainee at Manchester United, later earning himself a professional contract. Although he went on to captain United's reserve team, which included such players as Quinton Fortune, Luke Chadwick and Chris Eagles, he failed to break into the first team. Tate went on loan to Royal Antwerp, Manchester United's feeder club, in 2002, making seven appearances in the Belgian First Division. He did not score for Royal Antwerp in the two months he was there, but he did score an own goal against Gent on 17 February 2002, the first goal in a 3–3 draw.

=== Swansea City ===
Tate spent two loan periods at Swansea City. He played a major role in the club's battle against relegation from the Football League in the 2002–03 season, before joining the club on a permanent basis on 6 February 2004.

Initially a centre-back, Tate made a successful transition to the right-back slot. He further showed his versatility by playing several matches in the centre of midfield during an injury crisis at the club during the 2005–06 season, which saw him named as the club's Player of the Year. Tate was in the Swansea City team which won the Football League Trophy final against Carlisle United on 2 April 2006. After the final whistle, he and Lee Trundle were photographed holding a Welsh flag bearing the words "Fuck off Cardiff," which had been handed to them by Swansea supporters. The pair claimed to have been unaware of the message written on the flag. On 24 June 2006, both players were fined a week's wages and warned as to their future conduct by the Football Association of Wales, having already received police cautions for public order offences.

Swansea City reached the League One play-off final against Barnsley on 27 May 2006. The match finished at 2–2 after extra time, and went to a penalty shootout. With Swansea trailing 4–3, Tate saw his penalty saved, sealing Barnsley's promotion.

He continued mainly playing at right-back under Kenny Jackett and occasionally midfield to cover for injuries in the 2006–07 season. When former Swansea captain Roberto Martínez took over as the new manager by the 2007–08 season, Tate had lost his place at right-back to new arrival Àngel Rangel.

During the 2008–09 season, Tate covered all positions in defence, including one appearance as a goalkeeper against Queens Park Rangers. After injuries to Marcos Painter and Federico Bessone, Tate played at left-back for the rest of the 2008–09 season. Tate had a superb 2009–10 season as he played most of his matches in his favourite position at centre-back due to Garry Monk's injury-laden season, as well as captaining the side for most of the season. For the 2010–11 season, under new manager Brendan Rodgers, he resumed his position at left-back, although he has played centre-back ever since Monk got injured in an FA Cup tie against Colchester United on 8 January 2011.

On 28 August 2011, Tate broke his leg in a golf cart accident, managing to lodge his leg between the cart and a tree. The injury was estimated to rule him out for up to six months. Despite this, Tate signed a new contract with Swansea on 14 September 2011, keeping him at the club until June 2015. Tate made his comeback as a late substitute for Swansea in their penultimate match of the 2011–12 season at Old Trafford appearing against his former club, Manchester United.

A testimonial match for Tate against Manchester United was granted by Swansea in the summer of 2013. However, it was postponed because Swansea were scheduled to play Manchester United in their first Premier League fixture of the 2013–14 season. His testimonial was played four years later, on 9 August 2017, with a Swansea legends team facing a Manchester United legends team at the Liberty Stadium.

Tate had made 340 appearances for Swansea, scoring five goals in all competitions, which excludes the FAW Premier Cup, which Swansea competed in from 1997 to 2008.

Tate revealed that he was to exit the club in the summer 2015. This was confirmed by Swansea on 28 May 2015.

On 21 July 2016 it was announced that Tate would take up an Academy U18 coaching role, helping to coach the Swans' Under-18s team alongside Eric Ramsay and Chris Llewellyn as well as taking charge of any U17s matches.

==== Loan spells ====
After a falling out with Swansea manager Michael Laudrup, Tate joined Leeds United on loan on 22 November 2012 until January 2013. Tate represented the first signing by Leeds after the takeover by GFH Capital the previous day. Tate made his debut for Leeds against Crystal Palace on 24 November and was handed the squad number 15. Tate received praise for his performance's against Crystal Palace and Leicester City, helping Leeds earn two wins in his first two matches.

After the takeover of Leeds by GFH Capital on 21 December, new Leeds director Salem Patel revealed Leeds were in negotiations with Swansea City to sign Tate on a permanent deal. On 1 January, Tate extended his loan spell at Leeds until 26 January.

On 23 July 2013, Tate joined Championship side Yeovil Town on loan until 2 January 2014. Upon joining the club, the club made the announcement of the signing by producing a mocked-up picture of an easel outside Huish Park following the arrival of the Duke and Duchess of Cambridge's son the day before. Tate made his Yeovil debut in their 1–0 victory over Millwall on 3 August 2013. Tate made six appearances for Yeovil before returning to Swansea early on 5 September due to a hamstring injury.

On 3 January 2014, Tate joined Scottish Premiership side Aberdeen as an emergency signing to replace recently departed Reading defender Michael Hector, on loan until the end of the 2013–14 season. He made his Aberdeen debut on 10 January in a 1–0 home win against Hibernian.

Tate joined Crewe Alexandra on 24 September 2014 for an emergency 93-day loan, which was extended in January 2015 to the end of the 2014–15 season. Tate made 26 appearances for The Railwaymen, helping them to maintain their League One status.

=== Port Talbot Town ===
On 2 November 2015, it was announced Tate would be joining Welsh Premier League club Port Talbot Town.

== Coaching career ==
Following his retirement as a player, Tate began coaching at Swansea City's academy, where he worked with the under-16s and under-18s. He became an assistant first-team coach to Steve Cooper in September 2019, while continuing his work as a youth coach.

Following the appointment of Russell Martin, Tate stayed at the club to help the appointment process run smoothly. On 17 September 2021, it was confirmed that Tate was no longer a coach at Swansea City. A week later, on 24 September, it was confirmed that Tate had left Swansea to join Steve Cooper at Nottingham Forest. In December 2023 Tate left the club a day after Cooper was dismissed.

In July 2024 Tate was appointed Assistant Manager to Steve Cooper at Premier League club Leicester City. He left the club alongside Cooper in November 2024. He managed 1 game for Leicester against Ipswich (due to Cooper's touchline ban), which ended in a 1–1 draw.

== Career statistics ==
Appearances and goals by club, season and competition
Club	Season	League		FA Cup		League Cup		Europe		Other (Note: Includes FA Community Shield, Football League Trophy and Football League play-offs)		Total	
Club	Season	Apps	Goals	Apps	Goals	Apps	Goals	Apps	Goals	Apps	Goals	Apps	Goals
Manchester United	2000–01	0	0	0	0	0	0	0	0	0	0	0	0
Manchester United	2001–02	0	0	0	0	0	0	0	0	0	0	0	0
Manchester United	2002–03	0	0	0	0	0	0	0	0	–		0	0
Manchester United	2003–04	0	0	0	0	0	0	0	0	0	0	0	0
Manchester United	Total	0	0	0	0	0	0	0	0	0	0	0	0
Royal Antwerp (loan)	2001–02	7	0	–		–		–		–		7	0
Swansea City (loan)	2002–03	27	0	0	0	–		–		–		27	0
Swansea City (loan)	2003–04	9	0	–		–		–		1	0	10	0
Swansea City	2003–04	17	1	1	0	–		–		–		18	1
Swansea City	2004–05	23	0	3	0	1	0	–		1	0	28	0
Swansea City	2005–06	43	0	1	0	1	0	–		8	0	53	0
Swansea City	2006–07	38	1	4	0	0	0	–		2	0	44	1
Swansea City	2007–08	21	1	4	0	1	0	–		3	0	29	1
Swansea City	2008–09	25	1	4	0	2	0	–		–		31	1
Swansea City	2009–10	39	1	1	0	2	0	–		–		42	1
Swansea City	2010–11	40	0	1	0	4	0	–		3	0	48	0
Swansea City	2011–12	5	0	0	0	1	0	–		–		6	0
Swansea City	2012–13	3	0	0	0	1	0	–		–		4	0
Swansea City	Total	293	5	19	0	13	0	–		15	0	340	5
Leeds United (loan)	2012–13	10	0	1	0	–		–		–		11	0
Yeovil Town (loan)	2013–14	4	0	0	0	2	0	–		–		6	0
Aberdeen (loan)	2013–14	7	0	0	0	1	0	–		–		8	0
Crewe Alexandra (loan)	2014–15	15	0	0	0	2	0	–		–		15	0
Total		336	5	20	0	18	0	0	0	15	0	387	5

== Honours ==
Swansea City

- Football League Championship play-offs: 2011
- Football League One: 2007–08
- Football League Trophy: 2005–06
- FAW Premier Cup: 2004–05, 2005–06

Aberdeen

- Scottish League Cup: 2013–14

Individual

- Jimmy Murphy Young Player of the Year: 2000–01
