= Andy Robinson (footballer, born 1979) =

English footballer (born 1979)

Personal information
- Full name: Andrew Mark Robinson.
- Date of birth: 3 November 1979 (age 46)
- Place of birth: Birkenhead, England
- Height: 1.73 m (5 ft 8 in)
- Position: Winger

Youth career
- 2000–2002: Cammell Laird

Senior career*
Years	Team	Apps	(Gls)
2002–2003	Tranmere Rovers	0	(0)
2003–2008	Swansea City	195	(44)
2008–2010	Leeds United	38	(2)
2010	→ Tranmere Rovers (loan)	5	(1)
2011	→ Tranmere Rovers (loan)	15	(0)
2011–2014	Tranmere Rovers	77	(17)
2014–2015	Shrewsbury Town	2	(0)
2015	Stockport County	8	(0)
2019–2021	Ammanford	14	(3)
2021–?	Rock Ferry Social		
- * Club domestic league appearances and goals

Andrew Mark Robinson (born 3 November 1979) is an English former professional footballer who played as a winger.

Robinson's professional career began in 2002 at Tranmere Rovers and concluded in 2015 after a short stint at Shrewsbury Town. In this time, he made 332 league appearances in representing four clubs, scoring 64 goals. During his five years with Swansea City, he won the Football League Trophy in 2006 and the League One title in 2008.

== Career ==
=== Early career ===
Robinson began his football career playing for non-League Merseyside team Cammell Laird before being recruited by Tranmere Rovers on 1 December 2002. Rovers overlooked his potential however and soon released him, allowing Swansea City to snap him up; initially on a three-month trial then on a permanent basis.

=== Swansea City ===
Robinson had a very successful career at Swansea, losing a playoff final, winning promotion on two occasions and winning The Football League Trophy along the way. He played mostly as a winger. His Swansea career ended in them getting promoted to the Championship, with Swansea winning the League One championship, he was a vital part of Roberto Martínez's team playing on either flank with Paul Anderson occupying the other flank. Robinson provided many assists and goals for Swansea in the promotion season. And after turning down a new contract at Swansea, he chose to move to Leeds United.

He was also the scorer of the very last goal at the Vetch Field in the FAW Premier Cup Final against Wrexham in May 2005.

=== Leeds United ===
Robinson chose to accept an offer from Leeds United before their play-off final game against Doncaster Rovers. Leeds lost that game 1–0 and Robinson missed out on his Championship dream for the following season.

Robinson scored his first goal for Leeds against Chester City in the League Cup, which was only his second game for Leeds. Part the way through the 2008–09 season, Robinson was reunited with former Swansea teammate Lee Trundle, although Trundle's spell was short and largely forgettable during his time at Leeds. During his first season at Leeds, Robinson had many injury problems which led to quite a stop start season. He came on as a first-half substitute for Neil Kilkenny in the playoff semi final loss against Millwall, and ended the season with six goals in all competitions.

During the 2009–10 season, Robinson has found himself on the bench, usually coming on in the second half to try influence a game. Robinson scored his first goal of the season for Leeds in the Football League Trophy game against Darlington, scoring a freekick with the help of a deflection. Robinson has struggled to even get a place on the bench for Leeds, with him struggling with fitness issues, and the arrival of on loan wingers Max Gradel and Hogan Ephraim who are all ahead of him in the pecking order, with the likes of Robert Snodgrass, Bradley Johnson and Jonathan Howson all guaranteed starters. After not playing for Leeds' first team for several months, and not even being named in match day squads, Robinson was sent to play with the Leeds youth squad at a tournament in Dubai, in which the Leeds team got to the final in.

Upon his return from Dubai, Robinson joined Tranmere Rovers on loan on 25 March 2010 until the end of the season. He made his debut for the club during a 3–0 defeat to Brighton & Hove Albion on 27 March but was sent-off for foul play. He scored a long range effort against Millwall on 1 May 2010 to help his loan club Tranmere escape relegation and help his parent club, Leeds United win promotion back to the Championship. Tranmere managed to escape relegation to League Two.

On 14 May 2010, after returning from his loan at Tranmere Rovers, Robinson was advised by manager Simon Grayson to search for a new club and placed on the transfer list. He did not play a single game for Leeds' first team during the 2010–11 pre-season friendlies. Robinson initially struggled in his attempts to find a new club. Before Leeds' Championship game with Robinson's former club Swansea City, Robinson hinted that he made a mistake in leaving his previous employers.

Robinson had his contract with Leeds United terminated by mutual consent on 1 December 2010. Robinson revealed that despite having a difficult spell at Leeds he had no regrets about joining them.

=== Tranmere Rovers ===
He joined former club Tranmere, for his third spell with the club on 27 January 2011. The club offered him contract terms for the 2011–12 season.

After playing regularly for the rest of the 2010–11 season, local media reported that he had been offered a new contract for the 2011–12 season. He subsequently signed an additional contract keeping him with the club for the 2012–13 season. Robinson scored his first career hat-trick against Carlisle United in a 3–0 away win in August 2012.

Robinson's 2012–13 season at Tranmere got off to a flying start, with him winning the League One Player of the Month accolade in August, and scoring 7 goals in the process. Andy's presence on the pitch helped Rovers to the summit of League One, with the best start in their history. He was then ruled out for two weeks with injury.

On 13 June 2013 it was announced Robinson had signed a new one-year contract with Tranmere. He scored Tranmere's only goal in the League One opener at Walsall, and another in their second game, a 2–0 victory over Mansfield in the League Cup on 6 August.

He was released by Tranmere on 17 April 2014 after not getting much time on the pitch throughout the current campaign. His contract was cancelled after a mutual agreement.

=== Shrewsbury Town ===
Following a period on trial, Andy Robinson signed for Shrewsbury Town on a one-year deal on 17 July 2014. He made three substitute appearances in all competitions early in the season, but after picking up a serious knee injury was allowed an extended leave of absence to consider his future in December 2014. Robinson was reported to be on trial at Crawley Town in January 2015, although this was subsequently denied by Shrewsbury.

Having not featured at first team level since the previous August, Robinson was released by mutual agreement in March 2015, stating he was hoping to extend his playing career elsewhere, or move into a coaching position.

On 23 March 2015, Robinson announced his retirement because of a knee injury.

=== Stockport County ===
Robinson decided to extend his career by moving into the semi-professional game, joining former Football League club Stockport County, now of the National League North, in June 2015. His contract was terminated by mutual consent on 27 December. He then moved into the amateur game, playing Sunday league football for Rock Ferry Social.

=== Ammanford ===
In August 2019, Robinson signed for Ammanford, who are playing in the Cymru South league, the second tier of Welsh football. Robinson will be reunited with his former Swansea teammate, Lee Trundle, who also signed for Ammanford.

== Honours ==
Swansea City

- Football League One: 2007–08
- Football League Trophy: 2005–06
- FAW Premier Cup: 2004–05, 2005–06

Leeds United

- Football League One runner-up: 2009–10

Tranmere Rovers

- Liverpool Senior Cup: 2012

Individual

- Swansea City Player of the Year: 2003–04
- PFA Team of the Year: 2005–06 League One, 2007–08 League One
- FourFourTwo Best 50 Football League Players 2008: 47th
