= 2010–11 Swansea City A.F.C. season =

Swansea City
2010–11 season
- Chairman: Huw Jenkins
- Manager: Brendan Rodgers
- Stadium: Liberty Stadium
- Football League Championship: 3rd (promoted via play-off)
- FA Cup: Fourth round
- League Cup: Fourth round
- Top goalscorer: League: Scott Sinclair (19); All: Scott Sinclair (27)
- Highest home attendance: 19,309 (26 February 2011 vs Leeds United)
- Lowest home attendance: 12,411 (14 September 2010 vs Coventry City)
- Average home league attendance: 15,507
Home colours	Away colours

The 2010–11 season was Swansea City's 82nd season in the Football League. They finished in 3rd place, and won the Championship playoff, to win promotion to the Premier League. It was their first return to top-flight football since 1983.

The season was their third consecutive season in the second tier following a 7th-placed finish in the previous campaign, narrowly missing out on a play-off place.

During pre-season, Paulo Sousa left the club by mutual consent, and then later succeeded Nigel Pearson as the new Leicester City manager on 7 July. Brendan Rodgers was appointed as the new manager of Swansea on 16 July, on a 12-month rolling contract.

== Players ==
=== Squad information ===
N	Pos.	Nat.	Name	Age	EU	Since	App	Goals	Ends	Transfer fee	Notes
1	GK	(Netherlands)	Dorus de Vries	29	EU	2007	178	0	2011	Free	
2	DF	(England) (Wales)	Ashley Williams	26	EU	2008	141	10	2013	£400k	
3	DF	(Wales)	Neil Taylor	21	EU	2010	29	0	2013	Free	
5	DF	(England)	Alan Tate (vc)	27	EU	2004	285	5	2013	Free	
6	MF	(Netherlands)	Ferrie Bodde	28	EU	2007	54	14	2011	£85k	
7	MF	(Wales)	David Cotterill	22	EU	2010	35	4	2013	£600k	
8	MF	(England)	Darren Pratley	25	EU	2006	177	26	2011	£100k	
9	FW	(Scotland)	Craig Beattie	26	EU	2009	45	7	2012	£800k	
10	MF	(Spain)	Andrea Orlandi	26	EU	2007	69	2	2012	Free	
11	MF	(Netherlands)	Cedric van der Gun	31	EU	2009	35	3	2011	Free	
12	MF	(England)	Nathan Dyer	22	EU	2009	103	6	2012	£400k	
13	GK	(Wales)	David Cornell	19	EU	2009	0	0	2013	Youth system	
14	FW	(Scotland)	Stephen Dobbie	27	EU	2009	47	9	2012	Free	
15	FW	(Italy)	Fabio Borini	19	EU	2011	9	6	2011	Loan	
16	DF	(England)	Garry Monk (captain)	31	EU	2004	196	3	2012	Free	
17	DF	(Spain)	Albert Serrán	26	EU	2008	30	0	2011	£80k	
18	FW	(Spain)	Gorka Pintado	32	EU	2008	73	7	2011	£100k	
19	FW	(England)	Luke Moore	24	EU	2011	15	3	2013	Undisclosed fee	
20	MF	(Wales)	Shaun MacDonald	22	EU	2005	24	0	2012	Youth system	
21	MF	(England)	Scott Sinclair	21	EU	2010	43	19	2013	£500k	
22	DF	(Spain)	Àngel Rangel	27	EU	2007	159	5	2011	Undisclosed fee	
23	MF	(England)	Scott Donnelly	22	EU	2010	1	0	2013	Free	
24	MF	(Wales)	Joe Allen	20	EU	2007	91	3	2012	Youth system	
25	GK	(Belgium) (Democratic Republic of the Congo)	Yves Ma-Kalambay	24	EU	2010	0	0	2011	Free	
26	MF	(Netherlands)	Kemy Agustien	24	EU	2010	8	0	2012	Free	
27	MF	(England)	Mark Gower	31	EU	2008	107	3	2011	Free	
28	MF	(Republic of Ireland)	Thomas Butler	29	EU	2006	126	9	2011	Undisclosed fee	
29	MF	(Wales)	Ashley Richards	19	EU	2009	21	0	2012	Youth system	
31	MF	(Wales)	Lee Lucas	18	EU	2010	1	0	2013	Youth system	
33	FW	(Wales)	Kerry Morgan	21	EU	2007	3	0	Undisclosed	Youth system	
34	DF	(Wales)	Joe Walsh	18	EU	2010	0	0	2011	Youth system	
35	DF	(Wales)	Daniel Alfei	18	EU	2010	1	0	2011	Youth system	
36	FW	(Wales)	Casey Thomas	19	EU	2009	1	0	Undisclosed	Youth system	
37	MF	(England)	Leon Britton	27	EU	2011	312	11	2013	Free	
38	DF	(England)	Jamie Grimes	19	EU	2009	0	0	2011	Youth system	
44	MF	(England)	Ryan Harley	25	EU	2011	0	0	2014	Free	

- Last updated: 7 May 2011
- Source: Swansea City A.F.C. (for EU passport, country as international player, contract ending and transfer fee)
- Ordered by the 2010–11 season squad numbers.

=== Transfers in / out ===
==== In ====
No.	Pos.	Nat.	Name	Age	EU	Moving from	Type	Transfer window	Ends	Transfer fee	Source
23	MF	(England)	Donnelly	22	EU	Aldershot Town (England)	Transfer	Summer	2013	Free	
3	DF	(Wales)	Taylor	21	EU	Wrexham	Transfer	Summer	2013	Free	
21	MF	(England)	Sinclair	21	EU	Chelsea	Transfer	Summer	2013	£500k	
25	GK	(Belgium) (Democratic Republic of the Congo)	Ma-Kalambay	24	EU		Transfer	Summer	2011	Free	
26	MF	(Netherlands)	Agustien	24	EU		Transfer	Summer	2012	Free	
19	FW	(England)	Moore	24	EU	West Bromwich Albion	Transfer	Winter	2013	Undisclosed fee	
37	MF	(England)	Britton	28	EU	Sheffield United	Transfer	Winter	2013	Free	
44	MF	(England)	Harley	25	EU	Exeter City	Transfer	Winter	2014	Free	

==== Out ====
No.	Pos.	Nat.	Name	Age	EU	Moving to	Type	Transfer window	Transfer fee	Source
7	MF	(England)	Britton	27	EU	Sheffield United (England)	Contract expired	Summer	Free	
21	DF	(Italy) (Argentina)	Bessone	26	EU	Leeds United (England)	Contract expired	Summer	Free	
30	FW	(Wales)	Bond	23	EU	Neath	Contract expired	Summer	Free	
25	MF	(Wales)	Collins	24	EU	Haverfordwest County	Released	Summer		
15	MF	(Spain)	López	29	EU	Vitesse Arnhem (Netherlands)	Released	Winter		
42	FW	(Finland)	Kuqi	34	EU	Newcastle United (England)	Released	Winter		

Last updated: 13 January

=== Loans in / out ===
==== In ====
No.	Pos.	Name	Country	Age	Loan club	Started	Ended	Start source	End source
19	FW	Nouble	(England)	18	West Ham United	17 September 2010	26 October 2010		
30	FW	Emnes	(Netherlands)	22	Middlesbrough	18 October 2010	14 November 2010		
49	FW	Easter	(Wales)	28	Milton Keynes Dons	25 November 2010	13 January 2011		
15	DF	Edgar	(Canada)	23	Burnley	31 January 2011	17 February 2011		
15	FW	Borini	(Italy)	19	Chelsea	17 March 2011	3 June 2011		
30	FW	Priskin	(Hungary)	24	Ipswich Town	24 March 2011	25 April 2011		

Sources: For loan start source see "Start source". For loan end source see "End source".
EU = if holds or not a European Union passport; Country: when 2 flags, 1st flag = country that plays for internationally, 2nd flag = country of birth; No. = number on jersey; P = Position (for position name, pause mouse pointer on abbreviation); Name = Name on jersey (for more extensive name, pause mouse pointer on name); In/Out = In: The player came in on loan, Out: The player went out on loan; Loan club = the club that the player moved on loan to or the club that the player came from on loan; Started = the date when the player's loan started; Ended = the date when the player's loan ended.

==== Out ====
No.	Pos.	Name	Country	Age	Loan club	Started	Ended	Start source	End source
38	DF	Grimes	(England)	19	Forest Green Rovers	13 August 2010	25 September 2010		
33	MF	Morgan	(Wales)	21	Newport County	20 August 2010	1 January 2011		
20	FW	MacDonald	(Wales)	22	Yeovil Town	28 August 2010	4 January 2011		
42	FW	Kuqi	(Finland)	33	Derby County	13 September 2010	13 December 2010		
23	MF	Donnelly	(England)	22	Wycombe Wanderers	1 January 2011			
13	GK	Cornell	(Wales)	19	Port Talbot Town	6 January 2011			
18	FW	Pintado	(Spain)	32	AEK Larnaca	7 January 2011			
33	MF	Morgan	(Wales)	21	Newport County	13 January 2011			
36	MF	Thomas	(Wales)	19	Port Talbot Town	20 January 2011			
44	MF	Harley	(England)	25	Exeter City	21 January 2011			
7	MF	Cotterill	(Wales)	22	Portsmouth	17 February 2011			
26	MF	Agustien	(Netherlands)	24	Crystal Palace	10 March 2011			
20	FW	MacDonald	(Wales)	22	Yeovil Town	17 March 2011			

Sources: For loan start source see "Start source". For loan end source see "End source".
EU = if holds or not a European Union passport; Country: when 2 flags, 1st flag = country that plays for internationally, 2nd flag = country of birth; No. = number on jersey; P = Position (for position name, pause mouse pointer on abbreviation); Name = Name on jersey (for more extensive name, pause mouse pointer on name); In/Out = In: The player came in on loan, Out: The player went out on loan; Loan club = the club that the player moved on loan to or the club that the player came from on loan; Started = the date when the player's loan started; Ended = the date when the player's loan ended.

=== Squad statistics ===
				Total			League Champ'ship		FA Cup		Football League Cup	
No.	Pos.	Nat.	Name	Sts	App	Gls	App	Gls	App	Gls	App	Gls
1	GK	(Netherlands)	de Vries	48	48		46				2	
2	DF	(Wales) (England)	Williams	50	50	3	46	3	2		2	
3	DF	(Wales)	Taylor	27	31		29				2	
5	DF	(England)	Tate	42	45		40		1		4	
6	MF	(Netherlands)	Bodde									
7	MF	(Wales)	Cotterill	12	16	1	14	1			2	
8	MF	(England)	Pratley	32	39	11	34	9	2	1	3	1
9	FW	(Scotland)	Beattie	11	24	4	23	4			1	
10	MF	(Spain)	Orlandi	16	24		20		1		3	
11	MF	(Netherlands)	van der Gun	7	15	5	9	1	2	2	4	2
12	MF	(England)	Dyer	45	48	2	46	2	1		1	
13	GK	(Wales)	Cornell									
14	FW	(Scotland)	Dobbie	24	45	9	41	9	1		3	
15	FW	(Italy)	Borini	8	9	6	9	6				
16	DF	(England)	Monk	30	33	1	29		1	1	3	
17	DF	(Spain)	Serran	9	16		11		1		4	
18	FW	(Spain)	Pintado		1		1					
19	FW	(England)	Moore	13	17	3	15	3	2			
20	MF	(Wales)	MacDonald									
21	MF	(England)	Sinclair	42	47	24	43	19	2	1	2	4
22	DF	(Spain)	Rangel	38	40	2	38	2	1		1	
23	MF	(England)	Donnelly	1	2		1				1	
24	MF	(Wales)	Allen	34	45	2	40	2	2		3	
25	GK	(Belgium) (Democratic Republic of the Congo)	Ma-Kalambay	4	4				2		2	
26	MF	(Netherlands)	Agustien	5	11		8		2		1	
27	MF	(England)	Gower	37	42	2	39	2	1		2	
28	MF	(Republic of Ireland)	Butler									
29	MF	(Wales)	Richards	8	8		6		1		1	
31	MF	(Wales)	Lucas		1		1					
33	FW	(Wales)	Morgan	1	1						1	
34	DF	(Wales)	Walsh	1	1						1	
35	DF	(Wales)	Alfei	2	3		1		2			
36	MF	(Wales)	Thomas	1	1						1	
37	MF	(England)	Britton	10	17	1	17	1				
38	DF	(England)	Grimes									

Last updated: 7 May 2011
Source: Swans World
Ordered by Squad Numbers
0 shown as blank

==== No longer at the club ====
				Total			League Champ'ship		FA Cup		Football League Cup	
No.	Pos.	Nat.	Name	Sts	App	Gls	App	Gls	App	Gls	App	Gls
15	DF	(Canada)	Edgar									
15	MF	(Spain)	López	3	4		2				2	
19	FW	(England)	Nouble	2	6	1	6	1				
30	FW	(Hungary)	Priskin		4	1	4	1				
30	MF	(Netherlands)	Emnes	4	5	2	4	2			1	
42	FW	(Finland)	Kuqi	2	4	2	2				2	2
49	FW	(Wales)	Easter	2	7	1	6	1	1			

Last updated: 8 May 2011
Source: Swans World
Ordered by Squad Numbers
0 shown as blank

=== Scorers ===
==== All ====
Scorer	Goals
(England) Scott Sinclair	24
(England) Darren Pratley	11
(Scotland) Stephen Dobbie	9
(Italy) Fabio Borini	6
(Netherlands) Cedric van der Gun	5
(Scotland) Craig Beattie	4
(England) Luke Moore	3
(Wales) Ashley Williams	3
(Wales) Joe Allen	2
(England) Nathan Dyer	2
(Netherlands) Marvin Emnes	2
(England) Mark Gower	2
(Finland) Shefki Kuqi	2
(Spain) Àngel Rangel	2
(England) Leon Britton	1
(Wales) David Cotterill	1
(Wales) Jermaine Easter	1
(England) Garry Monk	1
(England) Frank Nouble	1
(Hungary) Tamás Priskin	1

==== League ====
Scorer	Goals
(England) Scott Sinclair	19
(Scotland) Stephen Dobbie	9
(England) Darren Pratley	9
(Italy) Fabio Borini	6
(Scotland) Craig Beattie	4
(England) Luke Moore	3
(Wales) Ashley Williams	3
(Wales) Joe Allen	2
(England) Nathan Dyer	2
(Netherlands) Marvin Emnes	2
(England) Mark Gower	2
(Spain) Àngel Rangel	2
(England) Leon Britton	1
(Wales) David Cotterill	1
(Wales) Jermaine Easter	1
(England) Frank Nouble	1
(Hungary) Tamás Priskin	1
(Netherlands) Cedric van der Gun	1

==== FA Cup ====
Scorer	Goals
(Netherlands) Cedric van der Gun	2
(England) Garry Monk	1
(England) Darren Pratley	1
(England) Scott Sinclair	1

==== League Cup ====
Scorer	Goals
(England) Scott Sinclair	4
(Finland) Shefki Kuqi	2
(Netherlands) Cedric van der Gun	2
(England) Darren Pratley	1

== Championship stats ==
=== League table ===
Pos	Team	Pld	W	D	L	GF	GA	GD	Pts	Promotion, qualification or relegation
1	Queens Park Rangers (C, P)	46	24	16	6	71	32	+39	88	Promotion to the Premier League
2	Norwich City (P)	46	23	15	8	83	58	+25	84	Promotion to the Premier League
3	Swansea City (O, P)	46	24	8	14	69	42	+27	80	Qualification for Championship play-offs
4	Cardiff City	46	23	11	12	76	54	+22	80	Qualification for Championship play-offs
5	Reading	46	20	17	9	77	51	+26	77	Qualification for Championship play-offs

Updated to match(es) played on 7 May 2011. Source: The Football League
Rules for classification: 1) points; 2) goal difference; 3) number of goals scored.
(C) Champions; (O) Play-off winners; (P) Promoted

=== Results summary ===
Overall								Home						Away					
Pld	W	D	L	GF	GA	GD	Pts	W	D	L	GF	GA	GD	W	D	L	GF	GA	GD
46	24	8	14	69	42	+27	80	15	5	3	41	11	+30	9	3	11	28	31	−3

Last updated: 7 May 2011.

=== Results by round ===
Round	1	2	3	4	5	6	7	8	9	10	11	12	13	14	15	16	17	18	19	20	21	22	23	24	25	26	27	28	29	30	31	32	33	34	35	36	37	38	39	40	41	42	43	44	45	46
Ground	A	H	A	H	A	H	H	A	A	H	A	H	H	A	A	H	H	A	H	A	H	A	A	H	H	A	H	A	A	H	A	H	A	H	A	H	A	H	A	H	H	A	A	H	A	H
Result	L	W	L	W	L	W	W	L	W	D	W	D	W	W	W	L	W	D	L	W	D	L	L	W	W	L	W	D	W	L	W	W	W	W	L	D	L	W	L	W	D	L	D	W	W	W
Position	22	9	14	12	14	13	6	9	8	8	4	6	3	3	3	3	3	3	3	3	3	4	4	3	2	4	2	4	3	5	5	3	2	2	2	2	3	3	4	4	4	5	5	4	4	3

A = Away; H = Home; W = Win; D = Draw; L = Loss

== Results ==
=== Pre-season friendlies ===
10 July 2010 Friendly	Port Talbot Town	1–2	Swansea City	Port Talbot
?	Bowen 56'	(Report)	Morgan 27'; N. Kuqi 90+3'	Stadium: Victoria Road; Attendance: ? Referee: ?

13 July 2010 Friendly	Hereford United	2–0	Swansea City	Hereford
?	McQuilkin 21'; Canham 52'	(Report)		Stadium: Edgar Street; Attendance: 1,568; Referee: ?

15 July 2010 Friendly	Neath	0–2	Swansea City	Neath
?		(Report)	Donnelly 1'; S. Kuqi 3'	Stadium: The Gnoll; Attendance: ? Referee: ?

17 July 2010 Friendly	Yeovil Town	0–1	Swansea City	Yeovil
?		(Report)	Cotterill 6'	Stadium: Huish Park; Attendance: 957; Referee: ?

20 July 2010 Friendly	Llanelli	1–5	Swansea City	Llanelli
?	Bowen	(Report)	Thomas 6'; S. Kuqi 18', 24' (pen.); Van der Gun 62'; N. Kuqi 84'	Stadium: Stebonheath Park; Attendance: 802; Referee: ?

24 July 2010 Friendly	Swansea City	1–0	Cheltenham Town	Swansea
?	Dobbie 52'	(Report)		Stadium: Liberty Stadium; Attendance: 5,239; Referee: ?

28 July 2010 Friendly	Haaglandia (Netherlands)	1–4	Swansea City	Rijswijk
?	Van de Hurk	(Report)	Dyer 24'; Cotterill 42'; Pintado 65', 90'	Stadium: Sportpark Prinses Irene; Attendance: ? Referee: ?

31 July 2010 Friendly	Voetbal Club Sparta (Netherlands)	1–9	Swansea City	The Hague
?	Aldogan 78'	(Report)	Pintado 6', 45'; Serrán 22'; Donnelly 50'; Agustien 52'; Pratley 53', 87'; Dyer 65'; S. Kuqi 76'	Stadium: ? Attendance: ? Referee: ?

29 July 2010 Friendly	ADO Den Haag (Netherlands)	1–0	Swansea City	The Hague
?	Immers 17'	(Report)		Stadium: Kyocera Stadion; Attendance: ? Referee: ?

3 August 2010 Friendly	Haverfordwest County	1–1	Swansea City	Haverfordwest
?	Bradford 25'	(Report)	Morgan 16'	Stadium: Bridge Meadow Stadium; Attendance: ? Referee: ?

=== Football League Championship ===
7 August 2010 1	Hull City	2–0	Swansea City	Kingston upon Hull
15:00 BST	Bostock 23'; Ashbee 50'	(Report)		Stadium: KC Stadium; Attendance: 21,478; Referee: M. Russell

14 August 2010 2	Swansea City	4–0	Preston North End	Swansea
15:00 BST	Dobbie 23'; Pratley 40'; Dyer 43'; Cotterill 56' (pen.)	(Report)		Stadium: Liberty Stadium; Attendance: 14,010; Referee: S. Rushton

21 August 2010 3	Norwich City	2–0	Swansea City	Norwich
15:00 BST	Williams 87' (o.g.); Jackson 90+4'	(Report)		Stadium: Carrow Road; Attendance: 23,852; Referee: P. Crossley

28 August 2010 4	Swansea City	1–0	Burnley	Swansea
15:00 BST	Sinclair 8'; Pratley (yellow card) 48' (yellow-red card) 58'	(Report)	Mears (yellow card) 42' (yellow-red card) 60'	Stadium: Liberty Stadium; Attendance: 14,010; Referee: S. Rushton

11 September 2010 5	Leeds United	2–1	Swansea City	Leeds
15:00 BST	Johnson 56'; Becchio 64'	(Report)	Dobbie 13'	Stadium: Elland Road; Attendance: 26,453; Referee: G. Hegley

14 September 2010 6	Swansea City	2–1	Coventry City	Swansea
19:45 BST	Pratley 19'; Sinclair 47'	(Report)	Turner 56'	Stadium: Liberty Stadium; Attendance: 12,441; Referee: G. Sutton

18 September 2010 7	Swansea City	2–0	Scunthorpe United	Swansea
15:00 BST	Sinclair 83'; Dobbie 85'	(Report)		Stadium: Liberty Stadium; Attendance: 13,597; Referee: D. McDermid

25 September 2010 8	Nottingham Forest	3–1	Swansea City	Nottingham
15:00 BST	McGugan 12' (pen.), 60'; Majewski 84'	(Report)	Van der Gun 90'	Stadium: City Ground; Attendance: 19,974; Referee: N. Swarbrick

28 September 2010 9	Watford	2–3	Swansea City	Watford
19:45 BST	Deeney 76'; M. Taylor 85'	(Report)	Sinclair 11'; Dobbie 30'; Nouble 69'	Stadium: Vicarage Road; Attendance: 11,485; Referee: I. Williamson

2 October 2010 10	Swansea City	0–0	Derby County	Swansea
15:00 BST		(Report)		Stadium: Liberty Stadium; Attendance: 15,071; Referee: P. Gibbs

16 October 2010 11	Reading	0–1	Swansea City	Reading
15:00 BST		(Report)	Sinclair 35'	Stadium: Madejski Stadium; Attendance: 18,418; Referee: O. Langford

19 October 2010 12	Swansea City	0–0	Queens Park Rangers	Swansea
19:45 BST		(Report)		Stadium: Liberty Stadium; Attendance: 16,742; Referee: S. Hooper

23 October 2010 13	Swansea City	2–0	Leicester City	Swansea
15:00 BST	Emnes 50'; Sinclair 90+4'	(Report)		Stadium: Liberty Stadium; Attendance: 14,651; Referee: K. Stroud

30 October 2010 14	Crystal Palace	0–3	Swansea City	London
15:00 BST		(Report)	Sinclair 6'; Pratley 71'; Allen 80'	Stadium: Selhurst Park; Attendance: 16,223; Referee: F. Graham

7 November 2010 15	Cardiff City	0–1	Swansea City	Cardiff
13:10 BST		(Report)	Emnes 75'	Stadium: Cardiff City Stadium; Attendance: 26,049; Referee: M. Jones

10 November 2010 16	Swansea City	0–1	Bristol City	Swansea
19:45 BST		(Report)	Stead 6'	Stadium: Liberty Stadium; Attendance: 14,741; Referee: G. Scott

14 November 2010 17	Swansea City	1–0	Middlesbrough	Swansea
15:00 BST	Sinclair 84'	(Report)		Stadium: Liberty Stadium; Attendance: 14,906; Referee: K. Hill

20 November 2010 18	Doncaster Rovers	1–1	Swansea City	Doncaster
15:00 BST	Hayter 16'	(Report)	Rangel 90+3'	Stadium: Keepmoat Stadium; Attendance: 13,614; Referee: D. Deadman

26 November 2010 19	Swansea City	1–2	Portsmouth	Swansea
19:45 BST	Beattie 2'	(Report)	Halford 65'; Nugent 43'	Stadium: Liberty Stadium; Attendance: 17,584; Referee: S. Tanner

4 December 2010 20	Ipswich Town	1–3	Swansea City	Ipswich
12:45 BST	Townsend 51'	(Report)	Beattie 64', 86'; Allen 70'	Stadium: Portman Road; Attendance: 16,978; Referee: A. D'Urso

10 December 2010 21	Swansea City	1–1	Millwall	Swansea
19:45 BST	Rangel 18'	(Report)	Mkandawire 26'	Stadium: Liberty Stadium; Attendance: 13,853; Referee: D. Whitestone

18 December 2010 22	Sheffield United	1–0	Swansea City	Sheffield
15:00 BST	C. Evans 44'	(Report)		Stadium: Bramall Lane; Attendance: 17,496; Referee: M. Russell

26 December 2010 23	Queens Park Rangers	4–0	Swansea City	London
13:00 BST	Mackie 16'; Hill (red card) 19'; Helguson 62' (pen.); Taarabt 70', 80'	(Report)	Tate (red card) 19'	Stadium: Loftus Road; Attendance: 15,963; Referee: P. Crossley

28 December 2010 24	Swansea City	1–0	Barnsley	Swansea
15:00 BST	Easter 27'	(Report)		Stadium: Liberty Stadium; Attendance: 15,093; Referee: G. Ward

1 January 2011 25	Swansea City	1–0	Reading	Swansea
15:00 BST	Pratley 65'	(Report)		Stadium: Liberty Stadium; Attendance: 14,329; Referee: S. Hooper

3 January 2011 26	Leicester City	2–1	Swansea City	Leicester
15:00 BST	Berner 6'; Vassell 43'	(Report)	Sinclair 12'	Stadium: Walkers Stadium; Attendance: 21,656; Referee: D. Deadman

15 January 2011 27	Swansea City	3–0	Crystal Palace	Swansea
12:45 BST	Pratley 43'; Sinclair 56' (pen.), 61' (pen.)	(Report)		Stadium: Liberty Stadium; Attendance: 13,369; Referee: J. Moss

22 January 2011 28	Barnsley	1–1	Swansea City	Barnsley
15:00 BST	Hassell 14'	(Report)	Sinclair 86' (pen.)	Stadium: Oakwell; Attendance: 10,481; Referee: P. Gibbs

1 February 2011 29	Bristol City	0–2	Swansea City	Bristol
19:45 BST		(Report)	Pratley 10', 67'	Stadium: Ashton Gate; Attendance: 14,366; Referee: D. Whitestone

6 February 2011 30	Swansea City	0–1	Cardiff City	Swansea
13:15 BST		(Report)	Bellamy 86'	Stadium: Liberty Stadium; Attendance: 18,280; Referee: M. Halsey

12 February 2011 31	Middlesbrough	3–4	Swansea City	Middlesbrough
15:00 BST	Emnes 8'; Grounds 34'; Lita 53'	(Report)	Dyer 14'; Sinclair 60' (pen.); Williams 68'; Beattie 90+4'	Stadium: Riverside Stadium; Attendance: 14,825; Referee: R. Madley

19 February 2011 32	Swansea City	3–0	Doncaster Rovers	Swansea
15:00 BST	Sinclair 6'; Williams 39'; Moore 78'	(Report)		Stadium: Liberty Stadium; Attendance: 13,309; Referee: P. Miller

22 February 2011 33	Coventry City	0–1	Swansea City	Coventry
19:45 BST		(Report)	Dobbie 76'	Stadium: Ricoh Arena; Attendance: 13,481; Referee: K. Stroud

26 February 2011 34	Swansea City	3–0	Leeds United	Swansea
12:45 BST	Sinclair 13', 55' (pen.); Moore 72'	(Report)		Stadium: Liberty Stadium; Attendance: 19,309; Referee: P. Dowd

5 March 2011 35	Scunthorpe United	1–0	Swansea City	Scunthorpe
15:00 BST	Garner 71' (pen.)	(Report)		Stadium: Glanford Park; Attendance: 4,608; Referee: K. Hill

8 March 2011 36	Swansea City	1–1	Watford	Swansea
19:45 BST	Dobbie 26'	(Report)	Graham 78'	Stadium: Liberty Stadium; Attendance: 14,410; Referee: L. Mason

12 March 2011 37	Derby County	2–1	Swansea City	Derby
15:00 BST	Williams 7' (o.g.); S. Davies 54'	(Report)	Pratley 65'	Stadium: Pride Park Stadium; Attendance: 25,341; Referee: G. Scott

19 March 2011 38	Swansea City	3–2	Nottingham Forest	Swansea
15:00 BST	Sinclair 21'; Borini 26', 56'	(Report)	Boyd 44'; Anderson 90+2'	Stadium: Liberty Stadium; Attendance: 18,371; Referee: S. Mathieson

2 April 2011 39	Preston North End	2–1	Swansea City	Preston
15:00 BST	Hume 3' (pen.), 83'	(Report)	Williams 24'	Stadium: Deepdale; Attendance: 11,791; Referee: D. Foster

9 April 2011 40	Swansea City	3–0	Norwich City	Swansea
17:20 BST	Borini 5'; Gower 29'; Priskin 90+4'	(Report)		Stadium: Liberty Stadium; Attendance: 19,094; Referee: A. Bates

12 April 2011 41	Swansea City	1–1	Hull City	Swansea
19:45 BST	Gower 63'	(Report)	C. Evans 70'	Stadium: Liberty Stadium; Attendance: 14,822; Referee: R. Booth

16 April 2011 42	Burnley	2–1	Swansea City	Burnley
15:00 BST	Williams 57' (o.g.); Eagles 77' (pen.)	(Report)	Borini 53'	Stadium: Turf Moor; Attendance: 13,675; Referee: D. Webb

23 April 2011 43	Portsmouth	0–0	Swansea City	Portsmouth
15:00 BST		(Report)		Stadium: Fratton Park; Attendance: 15,907; Referee: D. Deadman

25 April 2011 44	Swansea City	4–1	Ipswich Town	Swansea
15:00 BST	Borini 9', 30'; Moore 14'; Sinclair 71' (pen.)	(Report)	Healy 20'	Stadium: Liberty Stadium; Attendance: 16,001; Referee: J. Linington

30 April 2011 45	Millwall	0–2	Swansea City	London
15:00 BST		(Report)	Pratley 30'; Dobbie 47'	Stadium: The Den; Attendance: 15,101; Referee: M. Oliver

7 May 2011 46	Swansea City	4–0	Sheffield United	Swansea
12:45 BST	Dobbie 30', 60'; Sinclair 55' (pen.); Britton 90'	(Report)	Lowry (red card) 54'	Stadium: Liberty Stadium; Attendance: 17,584; Referee: E. Ilderton

=== Play-offs ===
==== Semi-finals ====
12 May 2011
19:45

Nottingham Forest	0–0	Swansea City
	Report	(red card) 2' Taylor

City Ground, Nottingham
Attendance: 27,881
Referee: Mike Dean
16 May 2011
19:45

Swansea City	3–1	Nottingham Forest
Britton 28'; Dobbie 33'; Pratley 90+3'	Report	Earnshaw 80'

Liberty Stadium, Swansea
Attendance: 19,816
Referee: Andre Marriner

==== Final ====
30 May 2011
15:00 BST

Reading	2–4	Swansea City
Allen 49' (o.g.); Mills 57'	Report	Sinclair 21' (pen.), 22', 80' (pen.); Dobbie 40'

Wembley Stadium, London
Attendance: 86,581
Referee: Phil Dowd

=== FA Cup ===
8 January 2011 Round 3	Swansea City	4–0	Colchester United	Swansea
15:00 BST	Monk 25'; Pratley (yellow card) 22', (goal) 35'; Van der Gun 68'; Sinclair 82'	(Report)	Izzet (yellow card) 52'; White (yellow card) 75'	Stadium: Liberty Stadium; Attendance: 7,005; Referee: R. Shoebridge

29 January 2011 Round 4	Swansea City	1–2	Leyton Orient	Swansea
12:50 BST	Van der Gun 45'	(Report)	Smith 35'; Chorley (yellow card) 54'; Tate 88' (o.g.)	Stadium: Liberty Stadium; Attendance: 6,281; Referee: S. Attwell

=== League Cup ===
10 August 2010 Round 1	Swansea City	3–0	Barnet	Swansea
19:45 BST	Van der Gun 24'; Pratley 72'; Tate (yellow card) 75'; S. Kuqi (yellow card) 75', (goal) 88'; Monk (yellow card) 80'	(Report)	Hughes (yellow card) 13'; Byrne (yellow card) 50'; Leach (yellow card) 53'	Stadium: Liberty Stadium; Attendance: 6,644; Referee: A. Penn

24 August 2010 Round 2	Tranmere Rovers	1–3	Swansea City	Birkenhead
19:45 BST	Showunmi 22'	(Report)	Serrán (yellow card) 60'; Van der Gun 73'; Sinclair 74'; S. Kuqi 90+5', (yellow card) 90+6'	Stadium: Prenton Park; Attendance: 2,450; Referee: M. Haywood

21 September 2010 Round 3	Peterborough United	1–3	Swansea City	Peterborough
19:45 BST	Mackail-Smith 7'; Tomlin (yellow card) 65'	(Report)	Sinclair 5', 41', 78'; Pratley (yellow card) 66'	Stadium: London Road Stadium; Attendance: 4,164; Referee: N. Miller

26 October 2010 Round 4	Wigan Athletic	2–0	Swansea City	Wigan
20:00 BST	Alcaraz (yellow card) 26'; Boselli 51'; Watson 90+3' (pen.)	(Report)	Tate (yellow card) 29'; Monk (yellow card) 61'; Taylor (yellow card) 70'; Orlandi (yellow card) 90+2'	Stadium: DW Stadium; Attendance: 11,705; Referee: K. Friend

== Footnotes ==
1. Fee could rise to £1M depending on Sinclair's future success at the club.
2. Britton had two spells with the club previously, making 295 appearances and scoring ten goals.
