= 2009–10 Swansea City A.F.C. season =

Swansea City
2009–10 season
- Chairman: Huw Jenkins
- Manager: Paulo Sousa
- Football League Championship: 7th
- FA Cup: Third Round
- League Cup: Second Round
- Top goalscorer: League: Darren Pratley (7); All: Darren Pratley (7)
- Highest home attendance: 18,794 vs Crystal Palace (28 December 2009)
- Lowest home attendance: 12,775 vs Reading (18 August 2009)
- Average home league attendance: 15,407
Home colours	Away colours

The 2009–10 season was Swansea City's 81st season in the Football League. It was their second consecutive season in the second tier following an eighth-placed finish in the previous campaign.

Swansea finished the season in seventh place, one place higher than the previous season, having just missed out on a play-off place to Blackpool.

== Events ==
This is a list of the significant events to occur at the club during the 2009–10 season, presented in chronological order.

=== May ===
- 8 May: Roberto Martínez, assistant manager Graeme Jones and chief scout Kevin Reeves started their scouting trip visiting Scotland, the Netherlands and Spain.
- 22 May: Swansea youngster Joe Allen was called up to the Welsh national squad to play a friendly against Estonia at Parc y Scarlets on 29 May.
- 22 May: Swansea City announce the signing of Queen of the South striker Stephen Dobbie. Dobbie put pen to paper on a free transfer that will keep him at the Liberty Stadium on a long-term performance-related deal.
- 31 May: The details of the pre-season Spanish tour are announced. Swansea will play Espanyol, Girona, and a triangular tournament against Gimnàstic de Tarragona and Sabadell.

=== June ===
- 2 June: Swansea City completed the signing of Southampton winger Nathan Dyer for a fee of £400,000.
- 4 June: Swansea City have given boss Roberto Martínez permission to hold talks with Wigan Athletic following the departure of Steve Bruce to Sunderland. Should the deal go ahead, Wigan will pay a sum close to £2 million in compensation.
- 11 June: Roberto Martínez was set to be unveiled as the new manager of Wigan Athletic at a press conference, but the deal was halted as Martínez failed to mention that he wanted his backroom staff from Swansea too join him. Huw Jenkins had demanded compensation for the backroom staff, and branded Whelan as "unfair and disrespectful."
- 15 June: Swansea and Wigan agree compensation for the loss of Martínez; the club has now confirmed the compensation package with the Premier League outfit for assistant-manager Graeme Jones, chief scout Kevin Reeves, goalkeeping coach Iñaki Bergara and masseur Oscar Brau.
- 16 June: Defender Matthew Collins signed a new contract extending his stay at Swansea until 2011.
- 16 June: Swansea City were handed a home tie against Brighton & Hove Albion in the Football League Cup first round.
- 16 June: Norwich City signed midfielder Owain Tudur Jones on a three-year deal for a sum thought to be in the region of £250,000.
- 17 June: The fixture list for all championship teams were released on 17 June. Swansea City's first match will be away against newly crowned League One champions Leicester City at the Walkers Stadium. Swansea's first home game will be against relegated Premier League side Middlesbrough.
- 18 June: Swansea City announced that they had offered the vacant managerial position to the Portuguese two-time Champions League-winning player Paulo Sousa and had verbally agreed a three-year contract. Swansea chairman Huw Jenkins went on to say, "He's young, bright, enthusiastic and a visionary with extensive knowledge and contacts not only throughout Europe, but world football."
- 23 June: Eredivisie runners-up Twente will be the first team to face Swansea City in pre-season on 18 July, they will then be playing Spanish side Almería on 1 August at the Liberty Stadium.
- 23 June: Paulo Sousa returned from Portugal and was officially unveiled as the new Swansea City manager at a press conference held at the Liberty Stadium at 13:30 GMT. He signed a three-year deal. Sousa said, "Together with the fans we can build a strong club, a strong city to be on the map not only in Wales and England, but everywhere."
- 25 June: Swansea City unveiled the online casino, 32Red, as their shirt sponsors for the 2009–10 season. The home and away kits were modeled by defenders Alan Tate and Marcos Painter.
- 26 June: Midfielder Joe Allen signed a new three-year contract with Swansea that will see him stay until 2012.
- 26 June: Swansea City rejected a £2.5 million bid from Bolton Wanderers for midfielder Ferrie Bodde.

=== July ===
- 2 July: Swansea and Neath Athletic agree to face each other in a pre-season friendly match on 20 July at The Gnoll.
- 9 July: Swansea agreed a fee believed to be £2 million with Wigan Athletic for Jason Scotland after Swansea had initially rejected a £1.25 million bid from Burnley.
- 13 July: Andrea Orlandi extended his stay at Swansea by signing a new one-year deal with the club.
- 17 July: Almería were confirmed to meet Swansea City in a pre-season friendly at the Liberty Stadium on 1 August.
- 18 July: The 2009–10 squad numbers were released. Notable changes were Nathan Dyer being switched from 31 to 12, new striker Stephen Dobbie was given number 14, and Mark Gower loses the "cursed" 11 jersey to number 27.
- 18 July: Jason Scotland completed his move to Wigan for £2 million and signed a two-year deal after receiving the necessary international clearance.
- 20 July: UEFA Cup winner Jordi Lopez signed a two-year deal for Swansea City on a free transfer.
- 25 July: Ipswich Town striker Pablo Couñago turned down the chance to join the Swans, despite both clubs agreeing an undisclosed transfer fee.
- 29 July: Joe Allen, Shaun MacDonald, Casey Thomas and Jazz Richards were named in Brian Flynn's Wales national under-21 football team to face Hungary in an Under-21 Euro 2011 qualifying match.

=== August ===
- 7 August: Ashley Williams was called up to the Welsh national team to face Montenegro in a Friendly.
- 8 August: Swansea football league campaign kicked off against Leicester City at the Walkers Stadium, but ended in a 2–1 defeat. However, midfielder Joe Allen suffered a Hamstring injury after 25 minutes.
- 11 August: Ashley Williams was named in the Championship Team of the Week following his performance against Leicester.
- 12 August: Swansea were drawn against Scunthorpe United at home in the second round of the League Cup following their 3–0 victory over Brighton & Hove Albion.
- 13 August: Swansea City and the Swansea City Council had come to an agreement to develop a Football academy in Landore in an investment worth over £1m.
- 18 August: Swansea City rejected a bid for Ferrie Bodde from previous, and now manager of Wigan Athletic, Roberto Martínez. It was understood that the Wigan had offered £4.5 million. However, Swansea Chairman Huw Jenkins went on to say, "Not only have we rejected the bid, but it's an offer we wouldn't even think twice about considering... In fact, the way it is structured – over such a long period of time and appearance related – it doesn't even constitute an offer."
- 22 August: Austrian front-man Besian Idrizaj signed for Swansea City on a two-year deal.
- 25 August: Swansea City's clash with Scunthorpe ended in controversy as Swansea had captain Garry Monk, Gorka Pintado and Àngel Rangel sent off, whilst striker Stephen Dobbie went off injured. This left Swansea down to just 7 men on the field. Tempers then erupted as debutant Besian Idrizaj was forced to play on despite being injured. The match would have been abandoned according to Football League rules. Football League rules state each side must have at least seven players on the pitch for a game to be played.
- 27 August: Swansea City completed a double swoop and signed club legend Lee Trundle on loan from Bristol City until 1 January 2010 and Craig Beattie joined the Swans from West Bromwich Albion on a three-year deal for a club record deal of £800k.

=== September ===
- 1 September: Swansea sign Trinidad and Tobago centre back Radanfah Abu Bakr on a three-month deal.
- 3 September: Lil Fuccillo became Swansea's new Chief Scout, moving from Newcastle United.
- 10 September: Former Ajax player Cedric van der Gun signed for Swansea on a one-year deal with an option to extend his stay a further 12 months.
- 28 September: Ferrie Bodde was ruled out for the rest of the season after rupturing a cruciate ligament in his left knee for a second time. Bodde lasted just eight minutes in the 2–1 victory against Sheffield United.

=== October ===
- 5 October: Dorus de Vries was named in the Championship Team of the Week.
- 7 October: Ashley Williams signed a new four-year contract that will keep him at the club until 2013.
- 15 October: Casey Thomas and Kerry Morgan joined Conference South side Newport County.

== Players ==
=== Squad stats ===
				Total			League Champ'ship		FA Cup		League Cup	
No.	Pos.	Nat.	Name	Sts	App	Gls	App	Gls	App	Gls	App	Gls
1	GK	(Netherlands)	De Vries	47	48		46		1		1	
2	DF	(Wales) (England)	Williams	44	45	5	45	5				
3	DF	(Republic of Ireland) (England)	Painter	6	6		4		1		1	
4	DF	(Wales)	O'Leary									
5	DF	(England)	Tate	41	41	1	38	1	1		2	
6	MF	(Netherlands)	Bodde	2	4		4					
7	MF	(England)	Britton	36	37		35				2	
8	MF	(Jamaica) (England)	Pratley	33	36	7	35	7	1			
9	FW	(Scotland)	Beattie	11	21	3	21	3				
10	MF	(Spain)	Orlandi	23	30	1	29	1			1	
11	MF	(Netherlands)	Van der Gun	20	24	2	23	2	1			
12	MF	(England)	Dyer	38	41	2	39	2			2	
14	FW	(Scotland)	Dobbie	5	9	3	6		1		2	3
15	MF	(Spain)	López	9	14		11		1		2	
16	DF	(England)	Monk	23	25	1	22		1		2	1
17	GK	(Wales)	Cornell	1	1						1	
18	FW	(Spain)	Pintado	18	33	2	31	2	1		1	
19	FW	(England)	Trundle	2	18	5	17	5	1			
20	MF	(Wales)	MacDonald	2	3		3					
21	DF	(Italy) (Argentina)	Bessone	22	22	1	21	1			1	
22	DF	(Spain)	Rangel	36	38		37				1	
23	FW	(Spain)	Bauzà	3	7		6				1	
24	MF	(Wales)	Allen	14	22		21		1			
25	DF	(Wales)	Collins	2	2		1				1	
26	DF	(Spain)	Serran	4	7		6		1			
27	MF	(England)	Gower	25	33	1	30	1	1		2	
28	MF	(Republic of Ireland)	Butler	9	24	1	24	1				
29	MF	(Wales)	Richards	10	15		15					
31	MF	(Wales)	Howard									
30	FW	(Wales)	Bond	2	2		1				1	
33	FW	(Wales)	Morgan	2	5		3				2	
34	DF	(Wales)	Walsh									
35	DF	(Wales)	Sheehan									
36	MF	(Wales)	Thomas		1		1					
37	MF	(Wales)	Lucas									
38	DF	(England)	Grimes									
39	DF	(England)	Burgin									
40	FW	(Austria)	Idrizaj	1	4		3				1	
42	FW	(Finland)	Kuqi	15	19	5	19	5				
43	DF	(Canada)	Edgar	5	5	1	5	1				
49	MF	(Wales)	Cotterill	15	21	4	20	3	1	1		

Last updated: 2 May 2010
Source: Swans World
Ordered by Squad Numbers
0 shown as blank

=== Disciplinary record ===
N	Pos.	Nat.	Name	Yellow card	Second yellow card	Red card	Notes
22	DF	(Spain)	Rangel	6		2	
18	FW	(Spain)	Pintado	2	1	1	
16	DF	(England)	Monk	4		1	
26	DF	(Spain)	Serran			1	
12	MF	(England)	Dyer	5	1		
15	MF	(Spain)	López		1		
7	MF	(England)	Britton	7			
10	MF	(Spain)	Orlandi	7			
5	DF	(England)	Tate	7			
8	MF	(Jamaica)	Pratley	6			
2	DF	(Wales)	Williams	5			
27	MF	(England)	Gower	4			
42	FW	(Finland)	Kuqi	3			
3	DF	(Republic of Ireland)	Painter	3			
24	MF	(Wales)	Allen	2			
1	GK	(Netherlands)	De Vries	2			
29	MF	(Wales)	Richards	2			
14	FW	(Scotland)	Dobbie	1			
11	FW	(Netherlands)	Van der Gun	1			
23	MF	(Spain)	Bauzà	1			
49	MF	(Wales)	Cotterill	1			

Only competitive matches
(yellow card) = Number of bookings; (second yellow card) = Number of sending offs after a second yellow card; (red card) = Number of sending offs by a direct red card.

== Awards ==
=== PFA Team of the Year ===
(Wales) Ashley Williams

=== Championship Team of the Week ===
The following Swansea players have been selected in the official Championship team of the week.

- 11 August: Ashley Williams
- 24 August: Alan Tate
- 31 August: Alan Tate
- 5 October: Dorus de Vries
- 2 November: Garry Monk
- 9 November: Darren Pratley
- 7 December: Lee Trundle
- 21 December: Àngel Rangel, Alan Tate, Darren Pratley, Andrea Orlandi
- 25 January: Dorus de Vries, Garry Monk, Gorka Pintado
- 22 February: Alan Tate
- 1 March: Dorus de Vries
- 19 April: Albert Serran

== Transfers ==
=== In ===
No.	Pos.	Nat.	Name	Age	EU	Moving from	Type	Transfer window	Ends	Transfer fee	Source
14	FW	(Scotland)	Dobbie	26	EU	Queen of the South (Scotland)	Free Agent	Summer	2012	Free	BBC Sport
12	MF	(England)	Dyer	21	EU	Southampton	Transferred	Summer	2012	£400,000	BBC Sport
15	MF	(Spain)	López	28	EU	Queens Park Rangers	Transferred	Summer	2011	Free	BBC Sport
40	FW	(Austria)	Idrizaj	21	EU		Free Agent	Summer	2011	Free	Swansea Official Website
9	FW	(Scotland)	Beattie	25	EU	West Bromwich Albion	Transferred	Summer	2012	£800,000	BBC Sport
11	MF	(Netherlands)	van der Gun	30	EU		Free Agent	Summer	2010	Free	BBC Sport
49	MF	(Wales)	Cotterill	22	EU	Sheffield United	Transferred	Winter	2013	£600,000	BBC Sport
42	FW	(Finland)	Kuqi	33	EU	TuS Koblenz (Germany)	Transferred	Winter	2011	Free	BBC Sport

=== Out ===
No.	Pos.	Name	Country	Age	Type	Moving to	Transfer window	Transfer fee	Apps	Goals	Source
15	DF	Lawrence	(Trinidad and Tobago)	34	Released	San Juan Jabloteh	Summer	n/a	79	7	BBC Sport
17	MF	Tudur Jones	(Wales)	24	Transferred	Norwich City	Summer	£250k	41	3	BBC Sport
19	FW	Jones	(Wales)	19	Released	Grimsby Town	Summer	n/a	7	0	Swansea Official Website
9	FW	Scotland	(Trinidad and Tobago)	30	Transferred	Wigan Athletic	Summer	£2mil	102	53	BBC Sport
4	DF	O'Leary	(Wales)	32	Released		Winter	n/a	281	10	BBC Sport

EU = if holds or not a European Union passport; Country: when 2 flags, 1st flag = country that plays for internationally, 2nd flag = country of birth; N = number on jersey; P = Position (for position name, pause mouse pointer on abbreviation); Name = Name on jersey (for more extensive name, pause mouse pointer on name); Age = age on the day of the signing; Moving from = only indicate the club the player was playing before start playing for this club in this season, for the type of the moving see Status column; Moving to = only indicates the club the player is going to play next, for the type of the moving see Status column; Ends = when the player's current contract ends; n/a = Not applicable; Apps = Total number of competitive appearances (including substitute appearances) at the club prior to departure; Goals = Total number of competitive goals scored at the club prior to departure.

== Loans ==
=== In ===
No.	Pos.	Name	Country	Age	Loan club	Started	Ended	Start source	End source
19	FW	Trundle	(England)	49	Bristol City	27 August 2009	2 May 2010	BBC Sport	
37	DF	Abu Bakr	(Trinidad and Tobago)	39	Caledonia AIA	1 September 2009	1 January 2010	BBC Sport	thisissouthwales.co.uk
49	MF	Cotterill	(Wales)	38	Sheffield United	26 November 2009	1 January 2010	BBC Sport	BBC Sport
43	DF	Edgar	(Canada)	39	Burnley	23 March 2010	2 May 2010	BBC Sport	

Sources: For loan start source see "Start source". For loan end source see "End source".
EU = if holds or not a European Union passport; Country: when 2 flags, 1st flag = country that plays for internationally, 2nd flag = country of birth; No. = number on jersey; P = Position (for position name, pause mouse pointer on abbreviation); Name = Name on jersey (for more extensive name, pause mouse pointer on name); In/Out = In: The player came in on loan, Out: The player went out on loan; Loan club = the club that the player moved on loan to or the club that the player came from on loan; Started = the date when the player's loan started; Ended = the date when the player's loan ended.

=== Out ===
No.	Pos.	Name	Country	Age	Loan club	Started	Ended	Start source	End source
38	DF	Grimes	(England)	35	Haverfordwest County	24 July 2009	April 2010	Swansea Official website	
4	MF	O'Leary	(Wales)	48	Leyton Orient	30 August 2009	30 September 2009	Swansea Official website	Orient Official website
20	MF	MacDonald	(Wales)	37	Yeovil Town	22 September 2009	26 April 2010	BBC Sport	Swansea Official website
32	FW	Morgan	(Wales)	37	Newport County	15 October 2009	24 April 2010	Swansea Official website	
36	MF	Thomas	(Wales)	35	Newport County	15 October 2009	24 April 2010	Swansea Official website	
3	DF	Painter	(Republic of Ireland)	39	Brighton & Hove Albion	13 January 2010	8 May 2010	BBC Sport	
14	FW	Dobbie	(Scotland)	43	Blackpool	1 February 2010	22 May 2010	BBC Sport	

Sources: For loan start source see "Start source". For loan end source see "End source".
EU = if holds or not a European Union passport; Country: when 2 flags, 1st flag = country that plays for internationally, 2nd flag = country of birth; No. = number on jersey; P = Position (for position name, pause mouse pointer on abbreviation); Name = Name on jersey (for more extensive name, pause mouse pointer on name); In/Out = In: The player came in on loan, Out: The player went out on loan; Loan club = the club that the player moved on loan to or the club that the player came from on loan; Started = the date when the player's loan started; Ended = the date when the player's loan ended.

=== New contracts ===
No.	Pos.	Nat.	Name	Age	Status	Contract length	Expiry date	Source
25	DF	(Wales)	Collins	40	Signed	2 years	June 2011	
24	MF	(Wales)	Allen	36	Signed	3 years	June 2012	
19	FW	(Wales)	Jones	36	Rejected	n/a	July 2009	
10	MF	(Spain)	Orlandi	41	Signed	1 Year	July 2010	
5	DF	(England)	Tate	43	Signed	4 Years	August 2013	
2	DF	(Wales)	Williams	41	Signed	4 Years	October 2013	
16	DF	(England)	Monk	47	Signed	3 Years	November 2012	
17	GK	(Wales)	Cornell	35	Signed	3.5 Years	July 2013	

== Championship Stats ==
=== Results summary ===
Overall								Home						Away					
Pld	W	D	L	GF	GA	GD	Pts	W	D	L	GF	GA	GD	W	D	L	GF	GA	GD
46	17	18	11	40	37	+3	69	10	10	3	21	12	+9	7	8	8	19	25	−6

Last updated: 2 May 2010.

=== Results by round ===
Round	1	2	3	4	5	6	7	8	9	10	11	12	13	14	15	16	17	18	19	20	21	22	23	24	25	26	27	28	29	30	31	32	33	34	35	36	37	38	39	40	41	42	43	44	45	46
Ground	A	H	H	A	H	A	H	A	H	A	H	A	A	H	A	H	H	A	A	H	H	A	A	H	H	A	H	H	A	H	A	A	H	A	A	H	H	A	A	H	A	H	A	H	A	H
Result	L	L	D	W	D	L	D	D	W	D	W	D	W	D	W	W	W	L	D	W	L	W	D	D	W	D	D	W	W	D	D	W	W	L	W	D	L	D	L	D	L	W	L	W	L	D
Position	23	24	23	15	19	20	19	19	17	16	15	16	11	12	11	9	4	7	7	5	6	5	6	6	4	4	5	5	5	4	4	4	4	4	4	4	5	5	5	5	5	5	6	6	7	7

A = Away; H = Home; W = Win; D = Draw; L = Loss

=== Championship table ===
Pos	Team	Pld	W	D	L	GF	GA	GD	Pts	Promotion, qualification or relegation
5	Leicester City	46	21	13	12	61	45	+16	76	Qualification for Championship play-offs
6	Blackpool (O, P)	46	19	13	14	74	58	+16	70	Qualification for Championship play-offs
7	Swansea City	46	17	18	11	40	37	+3	69	
8	Sheffield United	46	17	14	15	62	55	+7	65	
9	Reading	46	17	12	17	68	63	+5	63	

Source: The Football League
Rules for classification: 1) points; 2) goal difference; 3) number of goals scored.
(O) Play-off winners; (P) Promoted

== Results ==
=== Pre-season Friendlies ===
11 July 2009 Friendly	Trofense (Portugal)	0–1	Swansea City	Estádio do Fão
		Report	Pintado ?'	Attendance: ?
Note: The match was split into three 30-minute periods.

18 July 2009 Friendly	Swansea City	3–1	(Netherlands) FC Twente	Liberty Stadium
	Pintado 57' 90' (pen.); Thomas 78'	Report	Rukavytsya 61'	Attendance: 7,304; Referee: Huw Jones

20 July 2009 Friendly	Neath Athletic (Wales)	1–6	Swansea City	The Gnoll
	Davey ?'	Report	Dobbie 10' ?'; Orlandi 13'; Bond ?'; Bauzà ?'; Collins ?'	Attendance: ? Referee: ?

24 July 2009 Friendly	RCD Espanyol B (Spain)	2–0	Swansea City	Nou Estadi
	Williams 58' (o.g.); Pedraza 74'	Report		Attendance: ? Referee: ?

26 July 2009 Friendly	Palamós CF (Spain)	0–2	Swansea City	Nou Estadi
		Report	Bauzà ?' (pen.); Gower 89'	Attendance: ? Referee: ?

27 July 2009 Friendly	Gimnàstic Tarragona (Spain)	0–0 (5–4 p)	Swansea City	Nova Creu Alta
		Report		Attendance: ? Referee: ?
Note: 45 minutes were played for each match.

27 July 2009 Friendly	Sabadell (Spain)	1–2	Swansea City	Nova Creu Alta
	Roberto ?'	Report	Dobbie ?' ?'
Note: 45 minutes were played for each match.

1 August 2009 Friendly	Swansea City	4–1	(Scotland) Kilmarnock	Liberty Stadium
	Gower 38' (pen.), 48', 54'; Bond 81'	Report	Sammon 74'	Attendance: 5,193; Referee: ?

2 August 2009 Friendly	Port Talbot Town (Wales)	0–1	Swansea City	GenQuip Stadium
		Report	López 27'	Attendance: ~1,200; Referee: Ryan Thomas

=== Football League Championship ===
8 August 2009 FLC	Leicester City	2–1	Swansea City	Walkers Stadium
	Waghorn 69'; N'Guessan 72'	Report	Williams 17'	Attendance: 26,171; Referee: G. Hegley

15 August 2009 FLC	Swansea City	0–3	Middlesbrough	Liberty Stadium
		Report	Johnson 32'; Emnes 52'; Tuncay 82'	Attendance: 16,201; Referee: P. Taylor

18 August 2009 FLC	Swansea City	0–0	Reading	Liberty Stadium
		Report		Attendance: 12,775; Referee: Hooper

22 August 2009 FLC	Coventry City	0–1	Swansea City	Ricoh Arena
		Report	Williams 69'	Attendance: 16,307; Referee: P. Crossley

29 August 2009 FLC	Swansea City	1–1	Watford	Liberty Stadium
	Tate 90+3'	Report	Graham 66'	Attendance: 14,172; Referee: A. Taylor

12 September 2009 FLC	Preston North End	2–0	Swansea City	Deepdale
	Mellor 27'; Elliot 89'	Report		Attendance: 12,854; Referee: E. Ilderton

15 September 2009 FLC	Swansea City	0–0	Bristol City	Liberty Stadium
		Report		Attendance: 12,859; Referee: D. Whitestone

19 September 2009 FLC	Barnsley	0–0	Swansea City	Oakwell
		Report		Attendance: 11,596; Referee: R. Shoebridge

26 September 2009 FLC	Swansea City	2–1	Sheffield United	Liberty Stadium
	Trundle 52' (pen.); Butler 82'	Report	Quinn 73'	Attendance: 14,324; Referee: D. Deadman

29 September 2009 FLC	Doncaster Rovers	0–0	Swansea City	Keepmoat Stadium
		Report		Attendance: 8,833; Referee: A. Haines

3 October 2009 FLC	Swansea City	2–0	Queens Park Rangers	Liberty Stadium
	Gower 74'; Trundle 85'	Report		Attendance: 14,444; Referee: K. Hill

17 October 2009 FLC	Ipswich Town	1–1	Swansea City	Portman Road
	Couñago 15'	Report	Beattie 7'	Attendance: 19,667; Referee: K. Wright

20 October 2009 FLC	West Bromwich Albion	0–1	Swansea City	The Hawthorns
		Report	Beattie 50'	Attendance: 21,022; Referee: A. D'Urso

24 October 2009 FLC	Swansea City	0–0	Blackpool	Liberty Stadium
		Report		Attendance: 14,724; Referee: A. Hall

31 October 2009 FLC	Scunthorpe United	0–2	Swansea City	Glanford Park
		Report	Beattie 32'; Van der Gun 67'	Attendance: 5,201; Referee: K. Evans

7 November 2009 FLC	Swansea City	3–2	Cardiff City	Liberty Stadium
	Dyer 9'; Pratley 16', 61'	Report	Bothroyd 32'; Hudson 35'	Attendance: 18,209; Referee: L. Probert

20 November 2009 FLC	Swansea City	1–0	Derby County	Liberty Stadium
	Bessone 81'	Report		Attendance: 17,804; Referee: R. East

28 November 2009 FLC	Newcastle United	3–0	Swansea City	St James' Park
	Harewood 8', 28'; Løvenkrands 21'	Report		Attendance: 42,616; Referee: M. Haywood

5 December 2009 FLC	Peterborough United	2–2	Swansea City	London Road Stadium
	Whelpdale 55'; McLean 90+5'	Report	Trundle 84', 90+2'	Attendance: 7,312; Referee: R. Booth

8 December 2009 FLC	Swansea City	1–0	Plymouth Argyle	Liberty Stadium
	Trundle 52'	Report		Attendance: 14,004; Referee: S. Tanner

12 December 2009 FLC	Swansea City	0–1	Nottingham Forest	Liberty Stadium
		Report	McGoldrick 35'	Attendance: 16,690; Referee: S. Hooper

19 December 2009 FLC	Sheffield Wednesday	0–2	Swansea City	Hillsborough
		Report	Pratley 5', 36'	Attendance: 18,329; Referee: O. Langford

26 December 2009 FLC	Reading	1–1	Swansea City	Madejski Stadium
	Sigurðsson 45+3'	Report	Pratley 36'	Attendance: 19,608; Referee: M. Russell

28 December 2009 FLC	Swansea City	0–0	Crystal Palace	Liberty Stadium
		Report		Attendance: 18,794; Referee: A. Taylor

16 January 2010 FLC	Swansea City	1–0	Leicester City	Liberty Stadium
	Pintado 32'	Report		Attendance: 15,037; Referee: F. Graham

23 January 2010 FLC	Middlesbrough	1–1	Swansea City	Riverside Stadium
	Flood 58'	Report	Pintado 47'	Attendance: 16,847; Referee: A. Penn

26 January 2010 FLC	Swansea City	0–0	Coventry City	Liberty Stadium
		Report		Attendance: 13,868; Referee: D. McDermid

6 February 2010 FLC	Swansea City	2–0	Preston North End	Liberty Stadium
	Cotterill 35'; Williams 48'	Report		Attendance: 14,659; Referee: P. Gibbs

9 February 2010 FLC	Crystal Palace	0–1	Swansea City	Selhurst Park
		Report	Kuqi 14'	Attendance: 12,328; Referee: G. Scott

13 February 2010 FLC	Swansea City	1–1	Newcastle United	Liberty Stadium
	Cotterill 56'	Report	Carroll 87'	Attendance: 15,188; Referee: A. Woolmer

16 February 2010 FLC	Plymouth Argyle	1–1	Swansea City	Home Park
	Johnson 87'	Report	Pratley 46'	Attendance: 9,184; Referee: K. Hill

20 February 2010 FLC	Derby County	0–1	Swansea City	Pride Park
		Report	Kuqi 66'	Attendance: 31,024; Referee: S. Tanner

27 February 2010 FLC	Swansea City	1–0	Peterborough United	Liberty Stadium
	Cotterill 19' (pen.)	Report		Attendance: 16,175; Referee: G. Ward

6 March 2010 FLC	Nottingham Forest	1–0	Swansea City	City Ground
	Chambers 90+1'	Report		Attendance: 25,012; Referee: C. Webster

9 March 2010 FLC	Watford	0–1	Swansea City	Vicarage Road
		Report	Kuqi 18'	Attendance: 12,907; Referee: T. Kettle

13 March 2010 FLC	Swansea City	0–0	Sheffield Wednesday	Liberty Stadium
		Report		Attendance: 14,167; Referee: R. Booth

16 March 2010 FLC	Swansea City	0–2	West Bromwich Albion	Liberty Stadium
		Report	Dorrans 79' (pen.); Miller 89'	Attendance: 17,774; Referee: R. East

20 March 2010 FLC	Queens Park Rangers	1–1	Swansea City	Loftus Road
	German 76'	Report	Dyer 57'	Attendance: 15,502; Referee: C. Boyeson

23 March 2010 FLC	Blackpool	5–1	Swansea City	Bloomfield Road
	Ormerod 13', 68'; Evatt 45+1'; Burgess 50'; Taylor-Fletcher 82'	Report	Van der Gun 84'	Attendance: 9,149; Referee: N. Miller

27 March 2010 FLC	Swansea City	0–0	Ipswich Town	Liberty Stadium
		Report		Attendance: 14,902; Referee: C. Pawson

3 April 2010 FLC	Cardiff City	2–1	Swansea City	Cardiff City Stadium
	Chopra 42', 90+2'	Report	Orlandi 28'	Attendance: 25,130; Referee: P. Dowd

5 April 2010 FLC	Swansea City	3–0	Scunthorpe United	Liberty Stadium
	Edgar 27'; Williams 51'; Kuqi 80'	Report		Attendance: 14,830; Referee: D. Whitestone

10 April 2010 FLC	Bristol City	1–0	Swansea City	Ashton Gate
	Maynard 84'	Report		Attendance: 14,719; Referee: M. Dean

17 April 2010 FLC	Swansea City	3–1	Barnsley	Liberty Stadium
	Williams 23'; Kuqi 28'; Pratley 72'	Report	Moore 35'	Attendance: 15,139; Referee: D. Phillips

24 April 2010 FLC	Sheffield United	2–0	Swansea City	Bramall Lane
	Cresswell 62'; De Vries 90' (o.g.)	Report		Attendance: 25,966; Referee: S. Mathieson

2 May 2010 FLC	Swansea City	0–0	Doncaster Rovers	Liberty Stadium
		Report		Attendance: 17,630; Referee: G. Hegley

=== League Cup ===
11 August 2009 Round 1	Swansea City	3–0	Brighton & Hove Albion	Liberty Stadium
	Monk 17'; Dobbie 60', 90+3'	Report		Attendance: 6,400; Referee: Scott

25 August 2009 Round 2	Swansea City	1–2 (a.e.t.)	Scunthorpe United	Liberty Stadium
	Dobbie 79'	Report	Canavan 13'; Hooper 111' (pen.)	Attendance: 7,321; Referee: J.Linington

=== FA Cup ===
2 January 2010 Round 3	Leicester City	2–1	Swansea City	Walkers Stadium
	King 39'; N'Guessan 89'	Report	Cotterill 10'	Attendance: 12,307; Referee: Taylor
