= Craig Beattie =

Scottish footballer (born 1984)

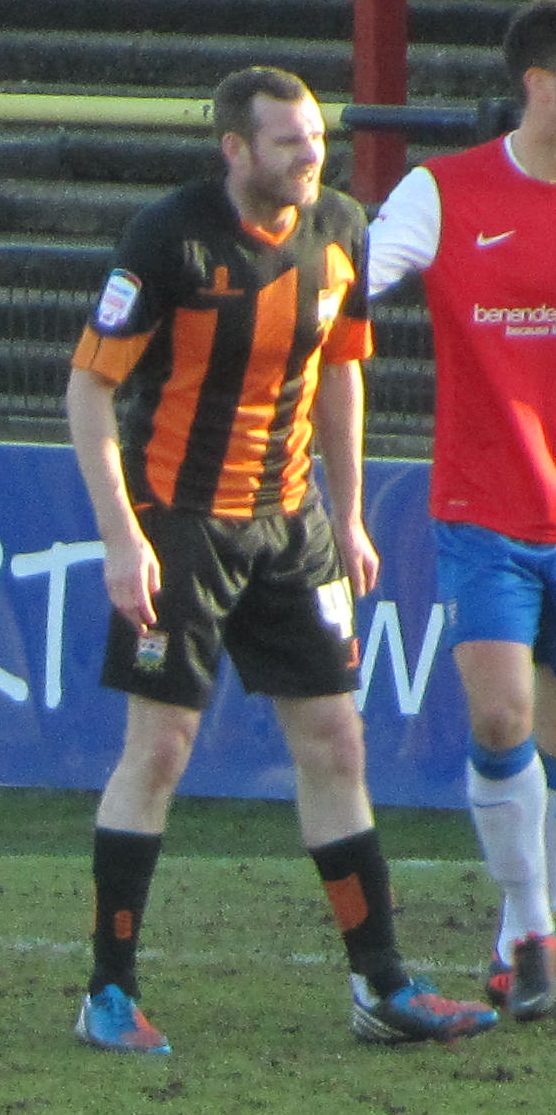
- Beattie in 2013

Personal information
- Full name: Craig Beattie
- Date of birth: 16 January 1984 (age 42)
- Place of birth: Glasgow, Scotland
- Height: 6 ft 0 in (1.83 m)
- Position: Striker

Youth career
- Heart of Midlothian
- 1999–2001: Rangers
- 2001–2003: Celtic

Senior career*
Years	Team	Apps	(Gls)
2003–2007	Celtic	50	(13)
2007–2009	West Bromwich Albion	31	(4)
2008	→ Preston North End (loan)	2	(0)
2008	→ Crystal Palace (loan)	15	(5)
2009	→ Sheffield United (loan)	13	(1)
2009–2012	Swansea City	45	(7)
2011	→ Watford (loan)	4	(1)
2012	Heart of Midlothian	5	(1)
2012–2013	St Johnstone	2	(0)
2013	Barnet	5	(0)
2013–2014	Dundee	18	(5)
2014	Żebbuġ Rangers	1	(0)
2014–2015	Ayr United	28	(6)
2015–2016	Stirling Albion	18	(3)
2016–2018	Edinburgh City	47	(8)
2018–2019	Elgin City	15	(0)
Total		299	(54)

International career
	Scotland U19	4	(6)
2004–2006	Scotland U21	7	(4)
2005–2007	Scotland B	2	(1)
2005–2007	Scotland	7	(1)
- * Club domestic league appearances and goals

Craig Beattie (born 16 January 1984) is a Scottish former professional footballer who played as a striker.

He started his career with Celtic before moving on to West Bromwich Albion and Swansea City, where he had loan spells with several Football League clubs. He then had mostly short spells with Heart of Midlothian, St Johnstone, Barnet, Dundee, Ayr United, Stirling Albion, Edinburgh City and Elgin City.

He gained seven caps for the Scotland national football team scoring once, and also represented the nation at U19, U21 and B levels.

== Club career ==
=== Youth career ===
Beattie trained with Heart of Midlothian at under-12 level before starting his career as a schoolboy with Rangers. After being released by manager Dick Advocaat, he joined Celtic.

=== Celtic ===
During a Celtic under-19 pre-season friendly against prominent Irish side Derry City, Beattie scored all six goals in a 6–0 win. He went on to make his senior debut aged 19 on 6 August 2003, as a substitute in a UEFA Champions League qualifying round 1–0 victory against FBK Kaunas. He made his league debut on 16 August against Dundee United. In his debut season he made 17 appearances, including starting in the UEFA Cup match against Barcelona.

After scoring four goals near the end of the 2004–05 season he was awarded a new three-year contract in July 2005. He started the 2005–06 season by becoming the first Scot since Gerry Creaney to score in three consecutive games for Celtic. He netted seven goals in the first three months of the season.

He appeared as substitute in 43 games and had 22 starts which limited his Celtic career goal tally to 16. His last appearance for Celtic came in the Scottish Cup final against Dunfermline on 26 May 2007 in a 1–0 win. His last Celtic goal came some months earlier against Aberdeen on 17 February 2007 in a 2–1 win.

=== West Bromwich Albion ===
On 3 July 2007 Beattie signed a three-year contract with Championship side West Bromwich Albion for an initial fee of £1.25 million with an added £500,000 depending on performance-related add-ons. He scored his first hat-trick for the team on 4 August 2007 in a friendly against Dutch side SC Heerenveen. Beattie made his competitive Albion debut in a 2–1 defeat away at Burnley on 11 August, the opening day of the 2007–08 season. Three days later he scored his first competitive goal for the club, as Albion beat AFC Bournemouth 1–0 in the League Cup. In his debut season he made 26 appearances scoring four times, before going on loan to Preston in March 2008.

On his return to West Brom he made his Premier League debut on 16 August 2008 against Arsenal as a substitute. West Brom manager Tony Mowbray stated that he would not stand in Beattie's way should he seek a move away from the Hawthorns and after just three appearances he was sent out on loan to Crystal Palace. On his return Beattie scored his first Premier League goal on 28 December 2008, against Tottenham Hotspur. His return was brief and he was sent on loan to Sheffield United.

His final game for West Brom came on 26 August 2009 in the League Cup scoring twice in their 4–3 win over Rotherham. In all he made 41 appearances scoring 7 times.

==== Loan deals ====
Beattie moved to Preston North End on 4 March 2008, on loan until the end of the season. He made his Preston debut later that day in a 1–0 win away at Leicester City, but was substituted after 38 minutes due to a muscle injury, later revealed to be a double hamstring tear. Beattie returned to West Brom early in order to receive treatment for the injury and was expected to miss the rest of the season. He made a rapid recovery however, and returned to Preston for the final two games of the loan spell, making one further appearance as a substitute.

In September 2008, Beattie joined Crystal Palace on a month-long loan, making his debut on 27 September against Ipswich. He scored on his second appearance to give them a victory over Charlton Athletic in the South London derby. The loan was later extended until 28 December 2008, however due to an injury to Ishmael Miller and some goal-scoring success at Palace, Beattie was recalled by West Bromwnich Albion on 10 December. In all he made 15 appearances scoring five times.

Beattie joined Sheffield United on a three-month loan in February 2009, making his debut a day later, appearing as a second-half substitute in a 2–2 draw away at Plymouth Argyle. Beattie made 16 appearances for United that season, all but three of them from the bench. He scored one goal in the process, netting the fourth in a 4–2 home win over Derby County in March. He played in all three of the team's play-off games at the end of the season, including the Final at Wembley Stadium, but with the club failing to clinch promotion he subsequently returned to his parent club.

=== Swansea City ===
On 27 August 2009, Beattie joined Swansea City as a replacement for departed striker Jason Scotland signing a three-year contract for a £800,000 fee. He scored his first goal on 17 October 2009 against Ipswich Town. He scored in his next game for Swansea against previous club West Bromwich Albion on 20 October. he scored his third goal of the season with a free-kick against Scunthorpe United on 31 October.

A year and a half after signing, Beattie scored his first goal at the Liberty Stadium in a 2–1 defeat at the hands of Portsmouth on 26 November 2010. On 4 December 2010, he scored two goals against Ipswich Town. Beattie scored his fourth goal of the season with the winner against Middlesbrough after Swansea came back from 3–1 down to beat 'Boro 4–3.

In October 2011 he was sent on loan to Watford to gain match time after recovering from an ankle injury. After his return Swansea announced on 20 January 2012 that Beattie had been released from his contract by mutual consent.

=== Watford (loan) ===
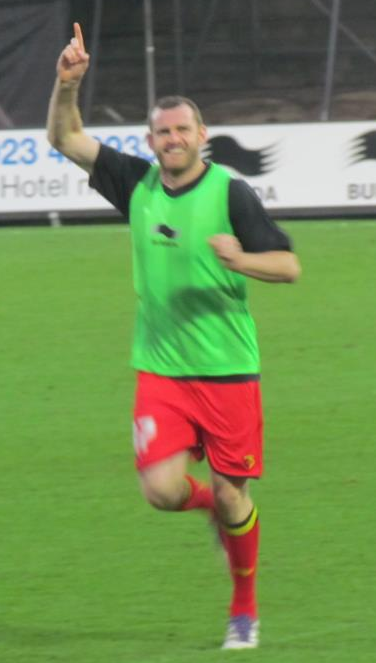
Beattie training with Watford in 2012

On 24 October 2011 Beattie joined Championship side Watford on loan until 8 January 2012. He made his debut on 5 November as a substitute against Middlesbrough. After an injury hit start at Watford, Beattie started only one game which was a 2–2 draw against Bristol City. He scored Watford's second goal of the game heading in from close range past David James. In all he made four appearances for Watford scoring once and struggled to break into the side with Troy Deeney, Chris Iwelumo, Marvin Sordell and Joe Garner restricting his first team opportunities.

=== Return to Scotland ===
Despite interest from other SPL sides and being poised to sign for Kilmarnock on 23 February 2012 he signed for Hearts until the end of the season. He chose the number 4 which is unusual for a striker. The vacant numbers were 4, 14, 16 and 37 which he wore at Celtic but he chose 4. Having not played a competitive game in two months he missed the game against Dundee United on 25 February as was not match fit. After scoring twice in a bounce game, he made his debut as a substitute on 3 March against Rangers in a 2–1 win at Ibrox. He scored his first goal for Hearts in a 2–2 draw with St Mirren in the Scottish Cup 6th round at Tynecaste on 10 March. He had a second goal in the same match wrongfully ruled out for offside. In just his second league appearance for the club he scored his first league goal against local rivals Hibernian in a 2–0 win. This goal made it 2 goals in 3 games for Beattie. On 15 April 2012, he set up the first goal and scored the winning penalty in a 2–1 win over Celtic in the Scottish Cup Semi Final. After the goal Beattie got booked for taking his shirt off and his impromptu lap of honour. He went on to appear as a substitute as Hearts beat Hibernian 5–1 in the final. In his short spell he quickly became a fans favourite. The club offered him a new deal on lesser terms however he turned this down and on 6 July 2012, the club confirmed his departure. In all he made nine appearances, scoring three times.

Upon leaving Hearts, Beattie had trial spells at South African side Bidvest Wits and Scottish Third Division side Rangers, who offered Beattie a contract however the deal fell through.

On 10 August 2012, he signed a one-year contract with St Johnstone. On 29 September 2012, Beattie made his debut, coming on as a substitute, in a 3–1 win over Dundee. However, Beattie first team well down the pecking order at St Johnstone, with strikers like Grégory Tadé, Nigel Hasselbaink, Rowan Vine and Steve MacLean took his spot. In the January transfer window, Beattie was linked with a move to League One side Notts County going on trial but returned to St Johnstone after Keith Curle said his lack of fitness was the reason he could not offer a loan deal. On 24 January 2013, after only four appearances he left the club by mutual consent.

=== Barnet ===
On 10 February 2013, Beattie signed for Football League Two side Barnet. He made his debut on 16 February when he started in a 2–1 away win at York City. After five appearances and no goals, he was released at the end of the 2012–13 season. In the 2013–14 pre-season he went on trial with Alloa Athletic, and later with Scunthorpe United, scoring in a friendly against Frickley Athletic, but was not offered a contract. He also went on trial with Scottish Premiership side Partick Thistle in August.

=== Dundee ===
Beattie signed for Scottish Championship side Dundee on 11 September 2013. Three days after signing for the club, Beattie made his debut for the club, in a 0–0 draw against Hamilton Academical. Beattie scored his first goal of the season, on 28 September 2013, in a 3–1 win over Greenock Morton. After making a good start, scoring three goals, Beattie, however, sustained a knee injury After an operation, it was announced that Beattie would be out for three months.

After Beattie returned to action, new manager Paul Hartley said he thought Beattie would have a big role to play. He made his first appearance since his injury, coming on as a substitute, in a 1–0 win over Dumbarton. Beattie scored in his first start, a 3–0 win over Alloa on 26 April 2014. After helping the club gain promotion to the Scottish Premiership, Beattie expressed concerns over his future at Dundee. It was confirmed by the club in May 2014 that his contract would not be renewed.

=== Malta and return to Scotland ===
Beattie signed for Maltese Premier League side Żebbuġ Rangers on 18 August 2014, on a one-year deal, with the option of a further year.

In the beginning of September, after less than two weeks with Żebbuġ Rangers, Beattie signed for Scottish League One club, Ayr United. At the end of the 2014–15 season, Beattie was released by The Honest Men. In what was described as a "shock move", Beattie subsequently signed for recently relegated Scottish League Two club Stirling Albion, however, Beattie departed at the end of the 2015–16 season, after 23 appearances and scoring six goals.

In July 2016, Beattie became the highest profile summer signing for newly promoted Scottish League Two club Edinburgh City. Beattie spent two seasons with the Citizens before departing in May 2018. Shortly after leaving Edinburgh, he signed for Elgin City on a one-year deal. Beattie left the club in January 2019.

== International career ==
Beattie made his full Scotland international debut as a 76th-minute substitute in a draw against Italy on 3 September 2005. He went on to score his first goal in a 2–1 victory against Georgia. In all he made seven appearances between 2005 and 2007, scoring once.

== Personal life ==
Beattie was born in Glasgow and attended Chryston High School. In April 2014, he was declared bankrupt after finding himself with debts of £70,000. His actions on his money problem resulted him being praised by his accountant.

As of 2021 he had taken on an administrative role as 'Members Services Officer' at the footballers' union PFA Scotland.

== Career statistics ==
=== Club ===
As of match played 5 October 2020

Appearances and goals by club, season and competition
Club	Season	League			National Cup		League Cup		Other		Total	
Club	Season	Division	Apps	Goals	Apps	Goals	Apps	Goals	Apps	Goals	Apps	Goals
Celtic	2003–04	Scottish Premier League	10	1	3	0	2	1	2 (Note: One appearance in the Champions League and one in the UEFA Cup)	0	17	2
Celtic	2004–05	Scottish Premier League	11	4	0	0	1	0	1 (Note: Appearances in the Champions League)	0	13	4
Celtic	2005–06	Scottish Premier League	13	6	0	0	1	0	1	1	15	7
Celtic	2006–07	Scottish Premier League	16	2	1	0	1	1	2	0	20	3
Celtic	Total		50	13	4	0	5	2	6	1	65	16
West Bromwich Albion	2007–08	Championship	21	3	2	0	3	1	0	0	26	4
West Bromwich Albion	2008–09	Premier League	7	1	2	0	1	0	0	0	10	1
West Bromwich Albion	2009–10	Championship	3	0	0	0	2	2	0	0	5	2
West Bromwich Albion	Total		31	4	4	0	6	3	0	0	41	7
Preston North End (loan)	2007–08	Championship	2	0	0	0	0	0	0	0	2	0
Crystal Palace (loan)	2008–09	Championship	15	5	0	0	0	0	0	0	15	5
Sheffield United (loan)	2008–09	Championship	13	1	0	0	0	0	3 (Note: Appearances in the Championship play-offs)	0	16	1
Swansea City	2009–10	Championship	23	3	0	0	0	0	0	0	23	3
Swansea City	2010–11	Championship	22	4	0	0	1	0	0	0	23	4
Swansea City	2011–12	Premier League	0	0	0	0	0	0	0	0	0	0
Swansea City	Total		45	7	0	0	1	0	0	0	46	7
Watford (loan)	2011–12	Championship	4	1	0	0	0	0	0	0	4	1
Heart of Midlothian	2011–12	Scottish Premier League	5	1	4	2	0	0	0	0	9	3
St Johnstone	2012–13	Scottish Premier League	2	0	1	0	1	0	0	0	4	0
Barnet	2012–13	League Two	5	0	0	0	0	0	0	0	5	0
Dundee	2013–14	Scottish Championship	18	5	1	0	1	0	0	0	20	5
Żebbuġ Rangers	2014–15	Maltese Premier League	1	0	0	0	—		—		1	0
Ayr United	2014–15	Scottish League One	28	6	2	0	0	0	0	0	30	6
Stirling Albion	2015–16	Scottish League Two	18	3	3	2	1	0	1 (Note: Appearance in the Scottish Challenge Cup)	1	23	6
Edinburgh City	2016–17	Scottish League Two	23	4	1	0	1	0	0	0	25	4
Edinburgh City	2017–18	Scottish League Two	24	4	1	0	3	0	0	0	28	4
Edinburgh City	Total		47	8	2	0	4	0	0	0	53	8
Elgin City	2018–19	Scottish League Two	15	0	2	0	0	0	0	0	17	0
Career total			299	54	23	4	19	5	10	2	352	65

=== International ===
Scores and results list Scotland's goal tally first, score column indicates score after Beattie goal.

International goal scored by Craig Beattie
No.	Date	Venue	Opponent	Score	Result	Competition	Ref.
1	24 March 2007	Glasgow, Scotland	Georgia	2–1	2–1	UEFA Euro 2008 qualifying	

== Honours ==
Celtic

- Scottish Premier League: 2003–04, 2005–06, 2006–07
- Scottish Cup: 2003–04, 2006–07

West Bromwich Albion

- Football League Championship: 2007–08

Swansea City

- Football League Championship play-offs: 2011

Hearts

- Scottish Cup: 2011–12

Dundee

- Scottish Championship: 2013–14

Scotland Youth

- Victory Shield: 1998–99
