= Shefki Kuqi =

Finnish footballer (born 1976)

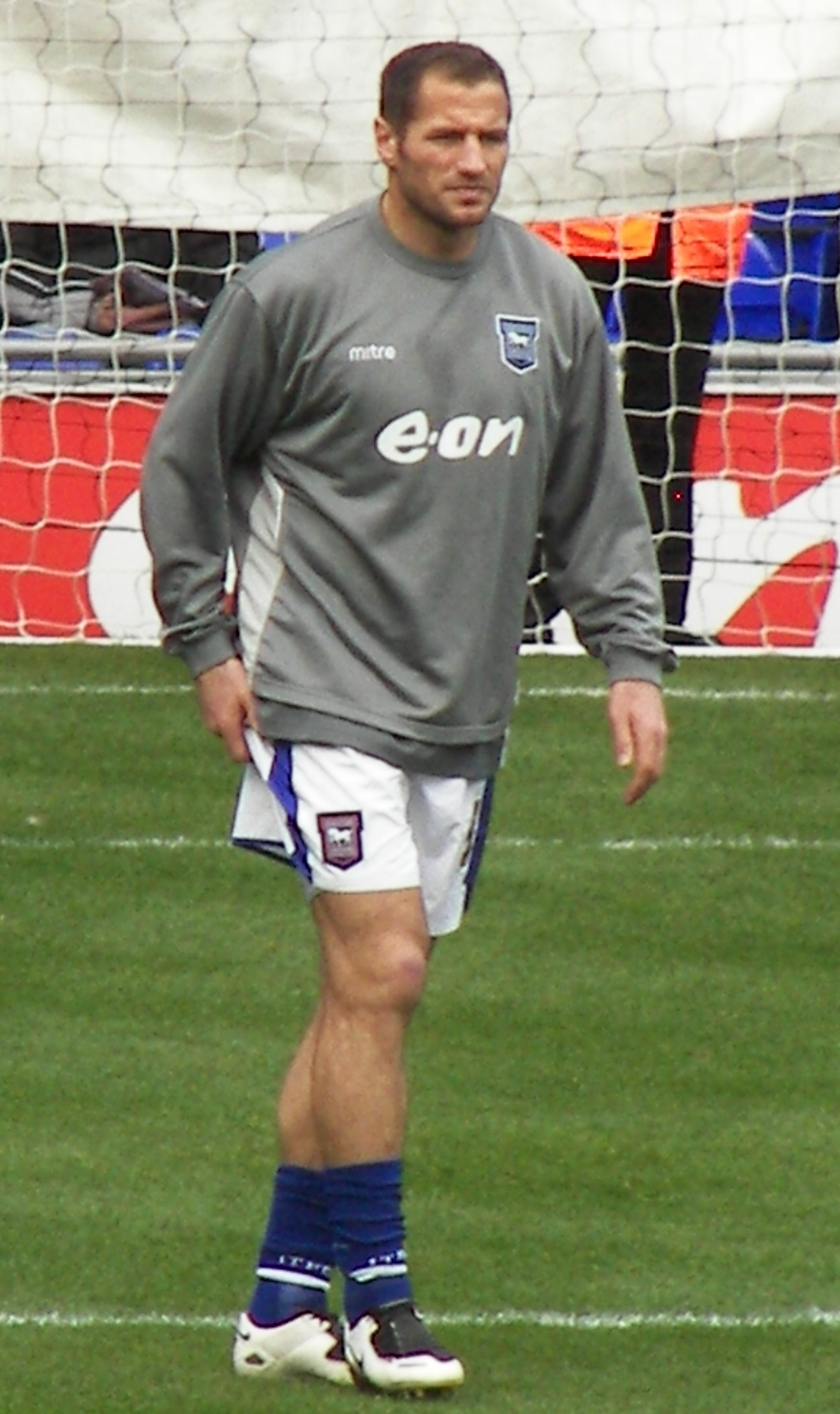
- Kuqi warming up for Ipswich Town in 2008

Personal information
- Full name: Shefki Kuqi
- Date of birth: 10 November 1976 (age 50)
- Place of birth: Vučitrn, SFR Yugoslavia
- Height: 1.88 m (6 ft 2 in)
- Position: Striker

Youth career
- –1989: Trepca
- 1990–1993: KaPa-51
- 1994: MiKi

Senior career*
| Years | Team | Apps | (Gls) |
| 1995–1996 | MP | 50 | (10) |
| 1997–1999 | HJK | 72 | (18) |
| 2000 | FC Jokerit | 33 | (19) |
| 2001–2002 | Stockport County | 35 | (11) |
| 2002–2003 | Sheffield Wednesday | 64 | (19) |
| 2003 | → Ipswich Town (loan) | 11 | (4) |
| 2003–2005 | Ipswich Town | 68 | (26) |
| 2005–2006 | Blackburn Rovers | 34 | (7) |
| 2006–2009 | Crystal Palace | 78 | (17) |
| 2007–2008 | → Fulham (loan) | 10 | (0) |
| 2008 | → Ipswich Town (loan) | 4 | (0) |
| 2009–2010 | TuS Koblenz | 17 | (7) |
| 2010–2011 | Swansea City | 22 | (5) |
| 2010 | → Derby County (loan) | 12 | (2) |
| 2011 | Newcastle United | 6 | (0) |
| 2011–2012 | Oldham Athletic | 40 | (11) |
| 2012–2013 | Hibernian | 13 | (0) |
| 2016 | Lohjan Pallo | 1 | (0) |
| Total | | 570 | (156) |

International career
| 1999–2010 | Finland | 62 | (8) |

Managerial career
- 2014: Honka
- 2015–2016: PK-35 Vantaa
- 2016–2017: Inter Turku
- 2024: Feronikeli
- 2025–2026: Chania
- * Club domestic league appearances and goals

Shefki Kuqi^{[a]} (Albanian pronunciation: [ˈʃɛfki ˈkuci]; born 10 November 1976) is a Kosovan-born Finnish professional football manager and former player who played predominantly as a striker.

He spent most of his career in the English football league system, for clubs including Newcastle United, Sheffield Wednesday, Ipswich Town, Blackburn Rovers, Crystal Palace, Fulham, Swansea City and Oldham Athletic. He made over 500 career league appearances, scoring over 150 goals.

Despite being born in Yugoslavia to Kosovan Albanian parents, Kuqi grew up in Finland and holds Finnish citizenship which allowed him to represent the Finland national team at international level, for which he scored eight goals in 62 appearances between 1999 and 2010. His trademark goal celebration of swallow-diving onto the ground has led to his nickname of the "Flying Finn".

== Early life ==
Kuqi started his youth career at Trepça, and he played several games for the youth team, but he and his family later moved to Finland as Kosovar Albanian immigrants.

== Club career ==
Kuqi started his playing career with Kangasniemen Palloseura. He later played for Mikkelin Kissat, Mikkelin Palloilijat, HJK and FC Jokerit in Finland's Veikkausliiga. Kuqi played in the UEFA Champions League in the autumn of 1998 with HJK. Kuqi was the league top scorer in the 2000 season, representing FC Jokerit. Having played for three clubs in Finland's Veikkausliiga, Kuqi became more well known, leading to his transfer to Stockport County.

=== Stockport County ===
Kuqi joined Stockport County in January 2001. Kuqi made his debut for the club in a 1–1 draw against Tranmere Rovers on 3 February 2001. Regarded by many as the saviour of County's 2000–01 season as he impressed with his speed and strength, he went on to score six goals in eighteen games to help County retain their division one status. Kuqi is still the club's second most internationally capped player. However, under player-manager Carlton Palmer, after he succeeded Andy Kilner as manager, Kuqi was used less frequently. His good performances led him being linked with his future club Blackburn. Kuqi was on the verge of joining Blackburn worth about a £1.2 million fee, but the move broke down and he accused Palmer of threatening him to be sacked for being injured Palmer was responsible for pressuring Graeme Souness for Kuqi not joining the club. Kuqi still maintains his accusations towards Palmer, claiming his management is 'clueless' and feels the club made a mistake having Palmer as manager. Kuqi joined Blackburn Rovers four years later.

=== Sheffield Wednesday ===
Kuqi joined Sheffield Wednesday and signed a three-year deal for an undisclosed sum, rumoured to be €1.5 million Kuqi made his debut for the club in a 1–0 win over Crewe on 12 January 2002. At Sheffield Wednesday he scored 19 times between January 2002 and September 2003, unfortunately with Wednesday being relegated to Division Two (or League One as it is now known) during his time at Hillsborough. Many Wednesday fans were bemused though at then manager Chris Turner's decision to let Kuqi leave for Ipswich for free after a strained relationship between the two. Whilst in Sheffield, Kuqi also scored a goal against Sheffield United in The Steel City Derby. He scored the second goal in the 81st minute at Hillsborough to ensure a win after Lloyd Owusu had opened the scoring with his very first touch of the ball on his debut.

=== Ipswich Town ===
In September 2003, Kuqi joined Ipswich Town on loan. After making 11 appearances and scoring 4 goals, Kuqi joined Ipswich Town permanently in November despite late interest from Town's rival Norwich City. For the next two seasons at Ipswich Town, Kuqi became a regular in the first team and able to score goals. He scored 20 goals in the Championship for Ipswich in the 2004–05 season, which made him the club's leading top scorer, along with Darren Bent. By the end of the season with his contract at Ipswich Town coming to an end, Kuqi rejected the offer of a new contract with the club.

=== Blackburn Rovers ===
His form with Ipswich earned him a move to the Premier League with Blackburn. Kuqi made his debut in a 3–1 loss against West Ham United on 13 September 2005 and scored his first goal of the Premier League and scored again in a 2–0 win over West Brom on 1 October 2005. After the match, manager Mark Hughes praised Kuqi for his two-goal performance. Kuqi then scored his second brace of the season in a 2–0 win over Middlesbrough on 26 December 2005. During the season, Kuqi struggled to command a first team place and found himself on the bench.

Kuqi scored seven Premier League goals for Blackburn in the 2005–06 season, but couldn't replicate his form from his time at Ipswich Town. During the following season Kuqi struggled to break into the first team and made only one appearance, coming on as a substitute in a 3–0 loss against Portsmouth. Six years later, Kuqi revealed he almost joined Celtic, but the club instead opted to sign Jan Vennegoor of Hesselink.

=== Crystal Palace ===
He joined Crystal Palace for a reported £2.5 million transfer fee at the end of the August transfer window in 2006. On his move, Kuqi admits he was surprised by Blackburn when he was sold to Crystal Palace and made his debut for the club in a 1–1 draw against Luton Town.

Kuqi did not have a prolific first season at Selhurst Park, scoring only seven goals in 38 games, and at the end of August 2007, he signed for Fulham on a four-month loan deal, where he made ten league appearances, scoring no goals.

Kuqi was placed on the transfer list and fined two weeks wages by Neil Warnock after signalling an offensive gesture to Palace fans when they cheered as he was substituted following a particularly poor performance in the 2–0 defeat against Wolverhampton Wanderers on 23 February 2008. Other reasons behind him being transfer listed were due to his weight gain and lack of fitness and Warnock told Kuqi there will be no way back for him

In March 2008, Kuqi returned to Ipswich on loan until the end of the season to fill in for the injured Jonathan Walters but failed to reproduce his form at Ipswich Town. He began the 2008–09 campaign with his first team prospects seemingly irretrievable but Crystal Palace manager Neil Warnock named (and used) him as a substitute for the away draw at Ipswich Town and home victory over Charlton in September and on 4 October he scored the second goal of Palace's 2–0 victory at Nottingham Forest. Kuqi's return to the first team completed a remarkable sequence of events, and he ended his season as the top scorer of his team. Kuqi was offered a new contract on 27 January 2009 which he rejected. By the end of the season, Kuqi was offered a new contract again along with 5 other players but a few months later, Warnock said he was expecting Kuqi to leave.

=== TuS Koblenz ===
After Kuqi's contract ran out at Crystal Palace on 1 July 2009, he signed a two years deal with TuS Koblenz which was his first non-England club since 2001, and the first German club in his career. He also spent half a season playing with his brother, Njazi Kuqi.

=== Swansea City ===
Kuqi signed for Swansea City on a free transfer from TuS Koblenz on 25 January 2010. He made his debut for the club in a 0–0 draw against Coventry City and scored his first goal for Swansea in a 1–0 win at former club Crystal Palace on 9 February 2010.

Despite scoring seven goals in 16 starts, after less than nine months at Swansea, Kuqi joined fellow Championship side Derby County on a three-month emergency loan deal on 13 September 2010. His first Derby goal, in his third appearance, also, came against Crystal Palace in a 5–0 Derby victory at Pride Park. After latching onto a sloppy stray backpass from former-Derby defender Claude Davis to complete the rout with a goal Kuqi joked that the strike was "the worst of the five!" On 26 January 2011 Kuqi's contract with Swansea was terminated by mutual consent after he failed to break through into the first team. After being released by the club, Kuqi was linked with joining Huddersfield Town

=== Newcastle United ===
On 10 February 2011, Kuqi joined Premier League side Newcastle United for the remainder of the season. He was given the number 42 shirt and made his debut against former club Blackburn Rovers on 12 February 2011 coming on in the 90th minute in a goalless draw. On his move, Kuqi admitted he was surprised to join the club but admitted that he was 'one of the happiest footballers in the world'

He was released on 25 May 2011 after making six appearances, all as a substitute, without scoring.

=== Oldham Athletic ===
In August 2011, following his release by Newcastle, Kuqi signed a one-year contract with Oldham Athletic. The signing was considered as something of a coup for the Latics, as Kuqi was playing in the Premier League, the previous season. He scored early in his first game for his new club in a home game against local rivals Huddersfield Town in a 1–1 draw and celebrated with his trademark Flying Finn celebration in front of the away fans. Kuqi made it two goals in two games for Oldham with a headed goal against Stevenage. Kuqi scored his third for Oldham against Leyton Orient in a 3–1 victory; he scored the equalising goal and assisted the other two goals in a 3–1 victory. Kuqi was on target again against the MK Dons in October 2011 taking advantage of a mistake by the MK Dons goalkeeper to help Athletic to a 2–1 victory. Kuqi added another two goals to his tally after scoring twice against Crewe Alexandra in the quarter-finals of the Football League Trophy to help Oldham progress to the semi-final of the tournament with a 3–1 victory, with Luca Scapuzzi also getting on the scoresheet.

Kuqi left the club following the expiry of his contract on 1 July 2012 as the club could not afford to keep him for the 2012–13 campaign.

=== Hibernian ===
In August 2012, Kuqi signed a one-year deal with Scottish Premier League (SPL) team Hibernian, with a further option. On his move, Kuqi said the passion of the fans (Hibernian) convinced him to join the club after he was in the stands to see an Edinburgh derby. On 18 August 2012, Kuqi made his debut, coming on as a substitute in a 2–1 win against St Mirren. Kuqi made only two starting appearances for Hibs during his season with the club and failed to score a goal in 14 total appearances. He was described by BBC Sport as being one of the worst signings in the SPL that season.

== International career ==
Kuqi made his debut for the Finland national team on 18 August 1999 against Belgium, soon after receiving Finnish citizenship. He was a regular member of the Finland squad from 1999 to 2010. Kuqi made 62 appearances for Finland and scored eight goals. He announced his retirement from international football on 24 November 2010.

== Coaching career ==
After his playing career, Kuqi was a manager of Honka, PK-35 Vantaa and Inter Turku in Finland. On 8 January 2024, he was appointed as the head coach of Kosovar club Feronikeli.

== Goal celebration ==
Kuqi has received some media attention – especially from Match of the Day – for his spectacular, and unusual, diving goal celebration known as a Swan Dive. Kuqi jumps forward with both arms out, in what could be described as an attempt to glide like a bird, before crashing to the ground; the movement bears some resemblance to a bellyflop and has been referred to as a "Flying Finn".

== Personal life ==
Kuqi was born in Vushtrri, Kosovo. An older brother of Kuqi was due to begin national service, which prompted his family to emigrate to Finland, where they were granted asylum. He is the older brother of Njazi Kuqi and Albert Kuqi, and the cousin of Daut Kuqi. In an interview in December 2017, Kuqi revealed that he is a supporter of English club Manchester United mostly because of Alex Ferguson.

== Career statistics ==
=== Club ===
Appearances and goals by club, season and competition
| Club | Season | League | | | National cup | | League cup | | Other | | Total | |
| Club | Season | Division | Apps | Goals | Apps | Goals | Apps | Goals | Apps | Goals | Apps | Goals |
|---|---|---|---|---|---|---|---|---|---|---|---|---|
| Mikkelin Palloilijat | 1995 | Veikkausliiga | 24 | 3 | 0 | 0 | – | | – | | 24 | 3 |
| Mikkelin Palloilijat | 1996 | Veikkausliiga | 26 | 7 | 0 | 0 | – | | – | | 26 | 7 |
| Mikkelin Palloilijat | Total | | 50 | 10 | 0 | 0 | 0 | 0 | 0 | 0 | 50 | 10 |
| HJK | 1997 | Veikkausliiga | 25 | 6 | – | | – | | 1 (Note: Includes UEFA Cup Winners' Cup) | 0 | 26 | 6 |
| HJK | 1998 | Veikkausliiga | 22 | 1 | – | | – | | 10 (Note: Includes UEFA Champions League) | 1 | 32 | 1 |
| HJK | 1999 | Veikkausliiga | 25 | 11 | – | | – | | 4 (Note: Includes UEFA Cup) | 0 | 29 | 11 |
| HJK | Total | | 72 | 18 | 0 | 0 | 0 | 0 | 15 | 1 | 87 | 19 |
| FC Jokerit | 2000 | Veikkausliiga | 33 | 19 | – | | – | | 2 | 0 | 35 | 19 |
| Stockport County | 2000–01 | First Division | 17 | 6 | 1 | 0 | 0 | 0 | – | | 18 | 6 |
| Stockport County | 2001–02 | First Division | 18 | 5 | 0 | 0 | 2 | 1 | – | | 20 | 6 |
| Stockport County | Total | | 35 | 11 | 1 | 0 | 2 | 1 | 0 | 0 | 38 | 12 |
| Sheffield Wednesday | 2001–02 | First Division | 17 | 6 | 0 | 0 | 0 | 0 | – | | 17 | 6 |
| Sheffield Wednesday | 2002–03 | First Division | 40 | 8 | 1 | 0 | 2 | 0 | – | | 43 | 8 |
| Sheffield Wednesday | 2003–04 | Second Division | 7 | 5 | 0 | 0 | 1 | 0 | – | | 8 | 5 |
| Sheffield Wednesday | Total | | 64 | 19 | 1 | 0 | 3 | 0 | 0 | 0 | 68 | 19 |
| Ipswich Town | 2003–04 | First Division | 36 | 11 | 2 | 1 | 0 | 0 | 2 (Note: Appearances in First Division play-offs) | 0 | 40 | 12 |
| Ipswich Town | 2004–05 | Championship | 43 | 19 | 1 | 0 | 2 | 0 | 2 (Note: Appearances in Championship play-offs) | 1 | 48 | 20 |
| Ipswich Town | Total | | 79 | 30 | 3 | 1 | 2 | 0 | 4 | 1 | 88 | 32 |
| Blackburn Rovers | 2005–06 | Premier League | 33 | 7 | 2 | 0 | 6 | 1 | – | | 41 | 8 |
| Blackburn Rovers | 2006–07 | Premier League | 1 | 0 | 0 | 0 | 0 | 0 | – | | 1 | 0 |
| Blackburn Rovers | Total | | 34 | 7 | 2 | 0 | 6 | 1 | 0 | 0 | 42 | 8 |
| Crystal Palace | 2006–07 | Championship | 35 | 7 | 2 | 1 | 0 | 0 | – | | 37 | 8 |
| Crystal Palace | 2007–08 | Championship | 8 | 0 | 0 | 0 | 1 | 0 | 0 | 0 | 9 | 0 |
| Crystal Palace | 2008–09 | Championship | 35 | 10 | 2 | 0 | 0 | 0 | – | | 37 | 10 |
| Crystal Palace | Total | | 78 | 17 | 4 | 1 | 1 | 0 | 0 | 0 | 83 | 18 |
| Fulham (loan) | 2007–08 | Premier League | 10 | 0 | 0 | 0 | 0 | 0 | – | | 10 | 0 |
| Ipswich Town (loan) | 2007–08 | Championship | 4 | 0 | 0 | 0 | 0 | 0 | – | | 4 | 0 |
| TuS Koblenz | 2009–10 | 2. Bundesliga | 17 | 7 | 3 | 2 | – | | – | | 20 | 9 |
| Swansea City | 2009–10 | Championship | 20 | 5 | 0 | 0 | 0 | 0 | – | | 20 | 5 |
| Swansea City | 2010–11 | Championship | 2 | 0 | 0 | 0 | 2 | 2 | – | | 4 | 2 |
| Swansea City | Total | | 22 | 5 | 0 | 0 | 2 | 2 | 0 | 0 | 24 | 7 |
| Derby County (loan) | 2010–11 | Championship | 12 | 2 | 0 | 0 | 0 | 0 | – | | 12 | 2 |
| Newcastle United | 2010–11 | Premier League | 6 | 0 | 0 | 0 | 0 | 0 | – | | 6 | 0 |
| Oldham Athletic | 2011–12 | League One | 40 | 11 | 4 | 1 | 0 | 0 | 5 (Note: Appearances in Football League Trophy) | 4 | 49 | 16 |
| Hibernian | 2012–13 | Scottish Premier League | 13 | 0 | 0 | 0 | 1 | 0 | – | | 14 | 0 |
| Career total | | | 569 | 156 | 18 | 5 | 17 | 4 | 26 | 6 | 630 | 171 |

=== International ===
Appearances and goals by national team and year
| National team | Year | Apps | Goals |
|---|---|---|---|
| Finland | 1999 | 2 | 0 |
| Finland | 2000 | 11 | 2 |
| Finland | 2001 | 7 | 1 |
| Finland | 2002 | 7 | 1 |
| Finland | 2003 | 6 | 0 |
| Finland | 2004 | 4 | 2 |
| Finland | 2005 | 5 | 0 |
| Finland | 2006 | 5 | 0 |
| Finland | 2007 | 5 | 1 |
| Finland | 2008 | 0 | 0 |
| Finland | 2009 | 8 | 1 |
| Finland | 2010 | 2 | 0 |
| Total | | 62 | 8 |

Scores and results list Finland's goal tally first, score column indicates score after each Kuqi goal.

List of international goals scored by Shefki Kuqi
| No. | Date | Venue | Opponent | Score | Result | Competition |
|---|---|---|---|---|---|---|
| 1 | 23 February 2000 | Suphachalasai Stadium, Bangkok, Thailand | Estonia | 4–0 | 4–2 | 2000 Kings' Cup |
| 2 | 16 August 2000 | Ullevaal Stadion, Oslo, Norway | Norway | 3–1 | 3–1 | 2000–01 Nordic Football Championship |
| 3 | 1 September 2001 | Qemal Stafa, Tirana, Albania | Albania | 2–0 | 2–0 | 2002 FIFA World Cup qualification |
| 4 | 22 May 2002 | Helsinki Olympic Stadium, Helsinki, Finland | Latvia | 2–1 | 2–1 | Friendly |
| 5 | 9 October 2004 | Ratina Stadion, Tampere, Finland | Armenia | 1–0 | 3–1 | 2006 FIFA World Cup qualification |
| 6 | 9 October 2004 | Ratina Stadion, Tampere, Finland | Armenia | 3–1 | 3–1 | 2006 FIFA World Cup qualification |
| 7 | 17 November 2007 | Helsinki Olympic Stadium, Helsinki, Finland | Azerbaijan | 2–1 | 2–1 | UEFA Euro 2008 qualification |
| 8 | 28 March 2009 | Millennium Stadium, Cardiff, Wales | Wales | 2–0 | 2–0 | 2010 FIFA World Cup qualification |

== Managerial statistics ==
As of match played on 25 October 2025

Managerial record by team and tenure
| Team | Nat | From | To | Record | | | | |
| Team | Nat | From | To | G | W | D | L | Win % |
|---|---|---|---|---|---|---|---|---|
| Honka | (Finland) | 15 February 2014 | 9 January 2015 | 39 | 8 | 14 | 17 | 20.51 |
| PK-35 Vantaa | (Finland) | 9 January 2015 | 28 July 2016 | 61 | 27 | 12 | 22 | 44.26 |
| Inter Turku | (Finland) | 3 August 2016 | 3 August 2017 | 42 | 14 | 15 | 13 | 33.33 |
| Feronikeli | (Kosovo) | 8 January 2024 | 26 August 2024 | 23 | 7 | 5 | 11 | 30.43 |
| Chania | (Greece) | 17 October 2025 | 19 January 2026 | 12 | 3 | 1 | 8 | 25.00 |
| Total | | | | 177 | 59 | 47 | 71 | 33.33 |

== Honours ==
HJK Helsinki

- Veikkausliiga: 1997
- Finnish Cup: 1998
- Finnish League Cup: 1998

Individual

- Veikkausliiga top scorer: 2000
- Ipswich Town Player of the Year: 2004–05

== Notes ==
| a. | The Serbo-Croat spelling of the name is Šefki Kući. |
