= David Cotterill =

Welsh footballer (born 1987)

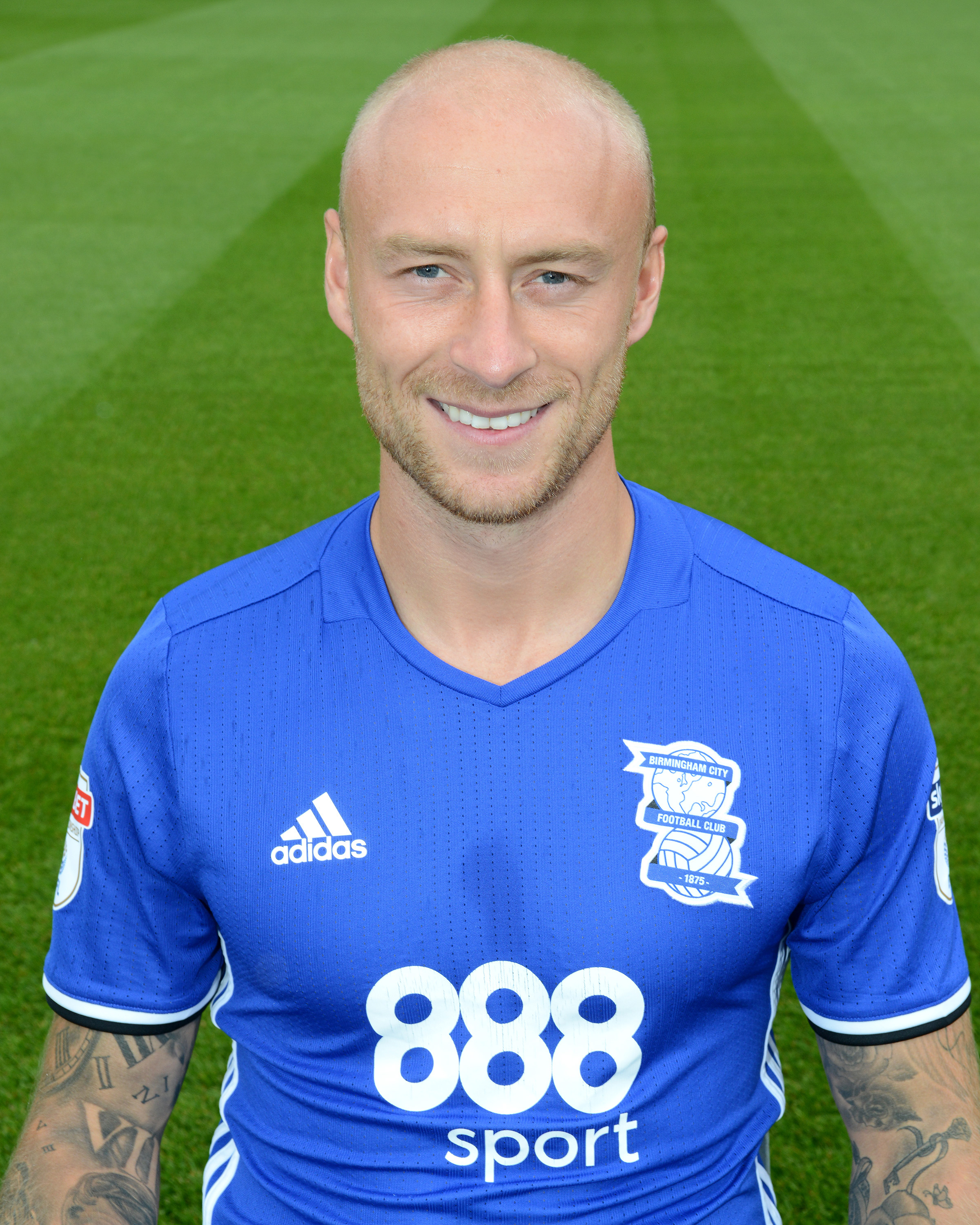
- Cotterill with Birmingham City in 2016

Personal information
- Full name: David Rhys George Best Cotterill
- Date of birth: 4 December 1987 (age 38)
- Place of birth: Cardiff, Wales
- Height: 5 ft 9 in (1.75 m)
- Position: Winger

Youth career
- Bristol City

Senior career*
Years	Team	Apps	(Gls)
2004–2006	Bristol City	62	(8)
2006–2008	Wigan Athletic	18	(1)
2008	→ Sheffield United (loan)	16	(0)
2008–2010	Sheffield United	38	(6)
2009–2010	→ Swansea City (loan)	4	(0)
2010–2012	Swansea City	31	(4)
2011	→ Portsmouth (loan)	15	(1)
2012	Barnsley	11	(1)
2012–2014	Doncaster Rovers	84	(14)
2014–2017	Birmingham City	103	(14)
2017	→ Bristol City (loan)	13	(2)
2018	ATK	3	(0)
2020–2021	Barry Town United	28	(5)
2021	Newtown	8	(0)
Total		434	(56)

International career
2004–2005	Wales U19	3	(1)
2005–2007	Wales U21	9	(4)
2005–2018	Wales	24	(2)
Medal record
Men's football
Representing Wales
UEFA European Championship
Bronze medal – third place	2016 France
- * Club domestic league appearances and goals as of 11:16, 21 July 2021 (UTC)

David Rhys George Best Cotterill (born 4 December 1987) is a Welsh former footballer who played as a winger.

Born in Cardiff, Cotterill began his career at Bristol City before signing for Premier League club Wigan Athletic where he spent two seasons before switching to Sheffield United, initially on loan and then later on a permanent deal. He then transferred to Swansea City in his native Wales, before spending a spell on loan at Portsmouth and then joining Barnsley. He had two seasons at Doncaster Rovers before joining Birmingham City. He spent the second half of the 2016–17 season on loan to Bristol City. Cotterill's contract with Birmingham was cancelled by mutual consent in December 2017, and he joined ATK of the Indian Super League. In January 2020, Cotterill came out of retirement to play in the Cymru Premier for Barry Town United and Newtown.

Cotterill represented Wales at full international level on 24 occasions from 2005 to 2018, scoring twice. He was part of their squad that reached the semi-finals of UEFA Euro 2016.

== Club career ==
=== Bristol City ===
Cotterill started his career at Bristol City, making his debut as a substitute for Michael Bell during a 0–0 draw with Colchester United on 30 October 2004. He played 57 games and scored seven goals for Bristol City during the 2005–06 season and was subsequently voted City's Young Player of the Season.

=== Wigan Athletic ===
Cotterill joined Premier League side Wigan Athletic on a three-year deal for £2 million on 31 August 2006. He scored his first goal for the club with a curling shot against West Ham United in a 2–0 victory at the Boleyn Ground, on 6 December 2006. Despite scoring two goals in 24 games for the Latics, his other goal coming against Sunderland in the FA Cup, Cotterill never fully established himself in the first team and was made available for loan.

=== Sheffield United ===
Seeking first team football to aid his international career, Cotterill joined Championship side Sheffield United on 8 February 2008 on a loan deal to last until the end of the 2007–08 season. He made his debut for the Blades the next day in a 0–0 home draw with Scunthorpe United eventually going on to play sixteen games for the Blades during his loan spell.

Cotterill returned to Bramall Lane later that summer and signed permanently for the Blades in July 2008 for an undisclosed fee. Having made his move permanent, Cotterill found it difficult to find the form that had made his loan spell a success and struggled to hold down a place in the side. It wasn't until the turn of the year that he began to force his way into the Blades first team, and was rewarded in March with his first goal in United colours, slotting home a penalty in a 2–1 home win against Birmingham City, and having taken over spot-kick duties he finished the season with four goals. After the Blades failure to secure promotion, Cotterill once again found form and first team starts hard to come by in the following season and was largely used as a substitute by manager Kevin Blackwell.

=== Swansea City ===
Cotterill moved to Swansea City on loan in November 2009, signing until the following January with a view to making the move permanent. He made his debut in the away fixture against Newcastle United, coming on as a second-half substitute, and scored his first goal for Swansea in a 2–1 FA Cup third round defeat to Leicester City on 2 January 2010. Following the move being made permanent for a then club record fee of £600,000, Cotterill scored three more goals during the 2009–10 season. The arrival of Scott Sinclair at the beginning of the 2010–11 season saw Cotterill employed more as a second striker behind Stephen Dobbie, rather than on the wing. Cotterill started the season off well under new manager Brendan Rodgers, putting in some good performances and converting a penalty in a 4–0 win over Preston North End. However, Cotterill then missed his next two penalties which on both occasions would have put his side in the lead and his confidence on the pitch appeared to drop. Cotterill was eventually sent out on loan to fellow Championship side Portsmouth in February 2011 initially on a one-month loan deal, taking the number 17 shirt vacated by John Utaka. He made his debut two days later in a 1–0 win over Barnsley, and scored his first goal for his new club against Ipswich Town on 26 February. Cotterill later extended his loan with Portsmouth until the end of the 2010–11 season.

During the 2011–12 season, as Swansea gained promotion to the Premier League, Cotterill's first-team appearances were limited and he was reportedly approached by Dutch team ADO Den Haag to sign for the club on loan. Cotterill was ultimately released from his Swansea City contract by mutual consent on 12 January 2012 after making no appearances during that season. A few days later he joined Leicester City on trial with a view to earning a permanent deal.

=== Barnsley ===
Cotterill signed for Barnsley on 16 February 2012, as a free agent. He scored his first, and what turned out to be only goal, for his new club against Peterborough United on 24 March 2012. After making eleven appearances for Barnsley, Cotterill was released at the end of the 2011–12 season when his short-term deal expired.

=== Doncaster Rovers ===
Cotterill joined Doncaster Rovers on 27 June 2012 on a two-year deal as they looked to bounce back to the Championship at the first time of asking. In his league debut for Doncaster at Walsall, he scored with a long-range shot from around 40 yards (37 m) out. Cotterill scored ten goals in 49 appearances during the 2012–13 season, and was named in the PFA Team of the Year for League One.

=== Birmingham City ===
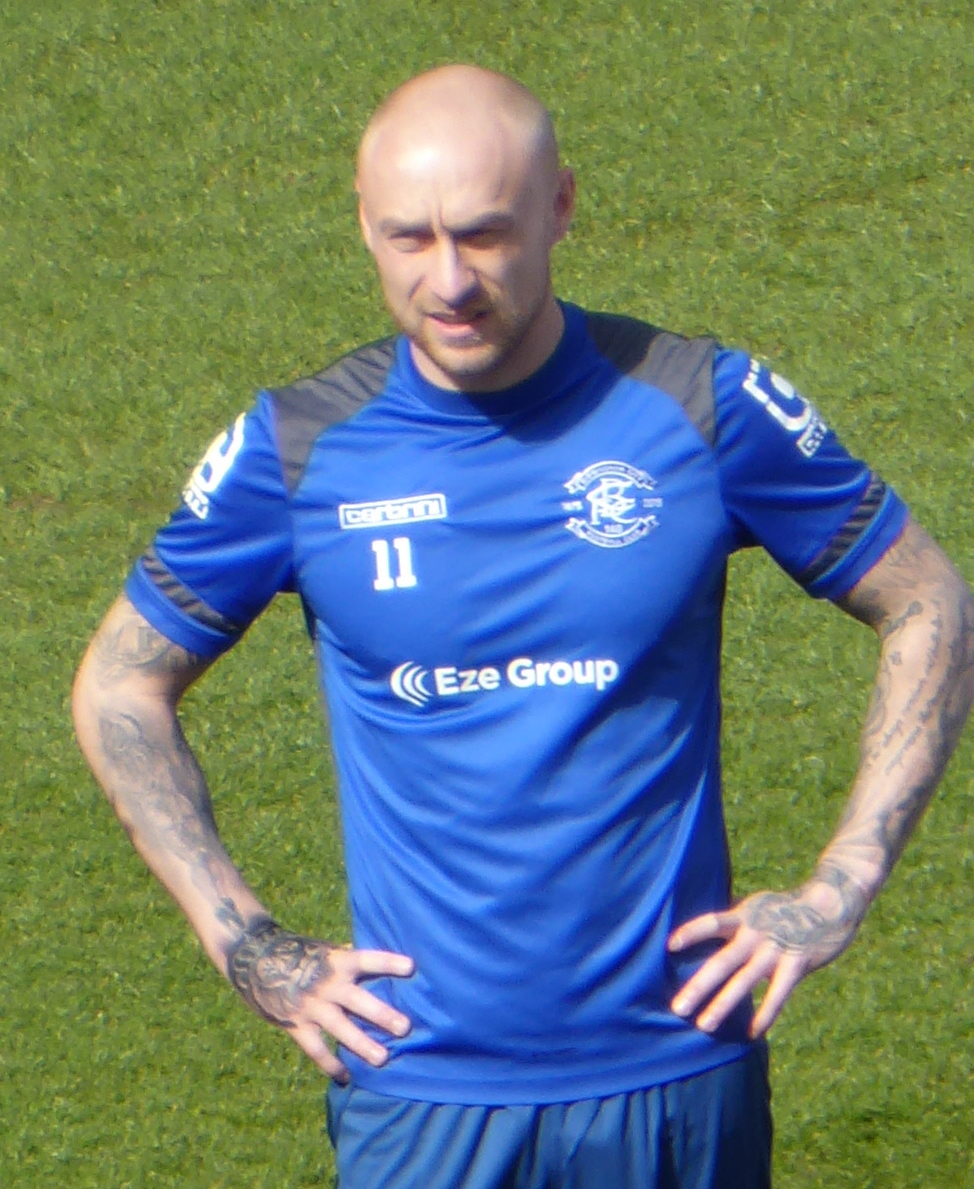
Cotterill with Birmingham City in April 2016

Although Doncaster offered Cotterill a new contract at the end of the 2013–14 season, he opted to move somewhere closer to his family in Wales. He signed a two-year contract with Championship club Birmingham City, and made his debut in the first-round League Cup win against Cambridge United on 12 August. He became a regular selection, and scored his first goal for the club on 27 September in a 2–1 defeat at home to Fulham. After Callum Reilly won the ball in midfield and slid it out to the wing, Cotterill cut inside a defender and curled a 25-yard (23 m) shot into the far top corner. In the next match, away to Millwall, he set up goals for Clayton Donaldson and Wes Thomas as well as scoring himself with a swerving free kick from 25 yards. Cotterill established himself as a regular member of the starting eleven, and finished his first season with 9 goals from 45 appearances in all competitions. Manager Gary Rowett highlighted his rare ability to "play badly and still affect the game in a positive way", such that "even when he is not on song he can still affect the game with a little bit of quality", as indicative of his importance to the team. In the 2015 close season, he signed a two-year extension to his contract.

He continued as a regular in the side until a hamstring injury sustained in early October kept him out for three weeks, and on his next start, in early November at home to Blackburn Rovers, he damaged a knee. Although the knee recovered and he was expected to be available for the visit to Sheffield Wednesday on 26 December, manager Gary Rowett chose not to risk him because of tightness in his hamstring. Cotterill returned to the side for the FA Cup match on 9 January, came off at half-time with a tight hamstring, and did not reappear for another five weeks, as a late substitute in the goalless draw at Rotherham United.

On 31 January 2017, Cotterill moved to Bristol City, the club with which he began his career, on loan until the end of the season. He made 13 appearances and scored twice.

Cotterill's contract with Birmingham was cancelled by mutual consent in December 2017.

=== ATK ===
Cotterill joined Indian Super League club ATK in January 2018. He made three appearances for the club in a spell that lasted around two months, before returning to the UK for the birth of his child.

Cotterill retired from football in October 2018.

=== Cymru Premier ===
In January 2020, Cotterill came out of retirement to play part-time for Cymru Premier side Barry Town United. He left Barry Town in June 2021.

In July 2021, Cotterill signed for fellow Cymru Premier side Newtown.

== International career ==
Cotterill was capped three times, scoring once for the under-19 team, and scored four goals from nine appearances for the under-21s.

Cotterill was a full Welsh international on 24 occasions. He made his debut on 12 October 2005 as a 73rd-minute substitute for goalscorer Ryan Giggs in a 2–0 home win over Azerbaijan in 2006 FIFA World Cup qualification. The following 27 May, he made his first start in Giggs's place in a 2–1 friendly win over Trinidad & Tobago, who were preparing for the tournament. He attracted controversy when he criticised the Wales manager John Toshack in May 2007, for having not been picked in the squad.

On 11 August 2010, Cotterill scored his first international goal to open a 5–1 friendly win over Luxembourg at Parc y Scarlets in Llanelli. His only other goal came on 13 October 2014 in a 2–1 home win over Cyprus in UEFA Euro 2016 qualification, opening the score four minutes after replacing the injured Simon Church in the ninth minute. He was part of the Wales squad that reached the semi-finals of the tournament in France – their first major event since the 1958 FIFA World Cup – but did not play. Birmingham City received €350,609.79 compensation from UEFA for his presence in the qualifiers and finals.

== Career statistics ==
=== Club ===
Appearances and goals by club, season and competition
Club	Season	League			National Cup		League Cup		Other		Total	
Club	Season	Division	Apps	Goals	Apps	Goals	Apps	Goals	Apps	Goals	Apps	Goals
Bristol City	2004–05	League One	12	0	0	0	0	0	1 (Note: Appearances in Football League Trophy)	0	13	0
Bristol City	2005–06	League One	45	7	1	0	0	0	1	0	47	7
Bristol City	2006–07	League One	5	1	—		1	1	0	0	6	2
Bristol City	Total		62	8	1	0	1	1	2	0	66	9
Wigan Athletic	2006–07	Premier League	16	1	1	0	—		—		17	1
Wigan Athletic	2007–08	Premier League	2	0	1	1	1	0	—		4	1
Wigan Athletic	Total		18	1	2	1	1	0	0	0	21	2
Sheffield United (loan)	2007–08	Championship	16	0	—		—		0	0	16	0
Sheffield United	2008–09	Championship	24	4	3	0	3	0	2 (Note: Appearances in the Championship play-offs)	0	32	4
Sheffield United	2009–10	Championship	14	2	—		0	0	0	0	14	2
Sheffield United	Total		54	6	3	0	3	0	2	0	62	6
Swansea City (loan)	2009–10	Championship	4	0	1	1	—		0	0	5	1
Swansea City	2009–10	Championship	17	3	—		—		0	0	17	3
Swansea City	2010–11	Championship	14	1	0	0	2	0	0	0	16	1
Swansea City	2011–12	Premier League	0	0	—		0	0	0	0	0	0
Swansea City	Total		35	4	1	1	2	0	0	0	38	5
Portsmouth (loan)	2010–11	Championship	15	1	—		—		—		15	1
Barnsley	2011–12	Championship	11	1	—		—		—		11	1
Doncaster Rovers	2012–13	League One	44	10	0	0	3	0	2	0	49	10
Doncaster Rovers	2013–14	Championship	40	4	1	0	2	0	0	0	43	4
Doncaster Rovers	Total		84	14	1	0	5	0	2	0	92	14
Birmingham City	2014–15	Championship	42	9	1	0	2	0	—		45	9
Birmingham City	2015–16	Championship	29	4	1	0	0	0	—		30	4
Birmingham City	2016–17	Championship	25	1	1	1	0	0	—		26	2
Birmingham City	2017–18	Championship	7	0	0	0	1	0	—		8	0
Birmingham City	Total		103	14	3	1	3	0	—		109	15
Bristol City (loan)	2016–17	Championship	13	2	—		—		—		13	2
ATK	2017–18	Indian Super League	3	0	—		—		—		3	0
Barry Town United	2019–20	Cymru Premier	28	5	—		—		2	0	29	5
Newtown	2020–21	Cymru Premier	8	0	—		—		2	0	10	0
Career total			432	55	11	3	15	1	8	0	461	60

=== International goals ===
Scores and results list Wales' goal tally first.

#	Date	Venue	Opponent	Score	Result	Competition
1.	11 August 2010	Parc y Scarlets, Llanelli, Wales	Luxembourg	1–0	5–1	Friendly
2.	13 October 2014	Cardiff City Stadium, Cardiff, Wales	Cyprus	1–0	2–1	UEFA Euro 2016 qualifying

== Personal life ==
Cotterill was born in Cardiff, Wales and has two children with former wife Sarah. After signing for Swansea City in 2010, Cotterill revealed that he had received death threats from fans of Cardiff City after scoring a penalty against them whilst at former club Sheffield United.

In September 2018, Cotterill revealed that he has suffered with depression, anxiety and suicidal thoughts throughout his life and career. In April 2019 he also revealed that he was suffering from alcohol problems.

In November 2020, Cotterill was being investigated by South Wales Police for allegedly cheating teammates out of money by convincing them to invest in property schemes. He moved back with his parents due to his financial problems, and began repaying those who had invested; he also took to Twitter to apologise for his actions.

Cotterill is an outspoken critic of the mainstream media and often posts on social media, in particular about vaccines and the COVID-19 pandemic in the United Kingdom. On 25 May 2022, he caused controversy when he posted on Instagram about the Robb Elementary School shooting suggesting that "crisis actors" were used in the shooting that killed 21 people. After the backlash Cotterill received, he deleted his post.

He is the cousin of Swansea City midfielder and Wales youth international Joel Cotterill.

== Honours ==
Doncaster Rovers

- Football League One: 2012–13

Individual

- PFA Team of the Year: 2012–13 League One
