= Dorus de Vries =

Dutch footballer (born 1980)

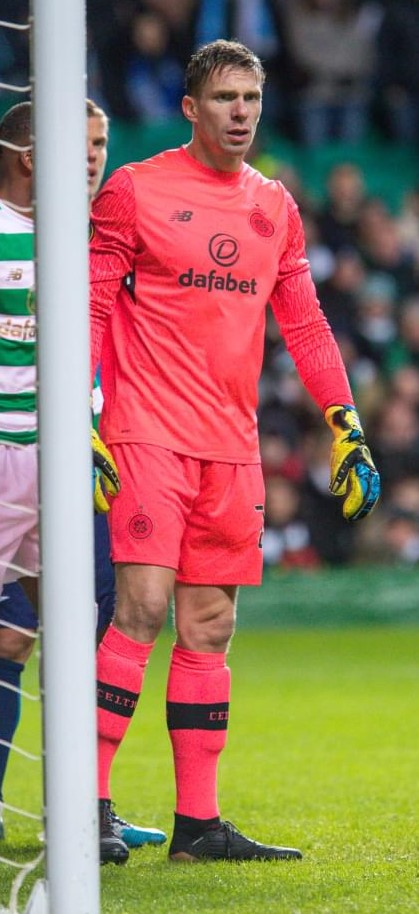
- De Vries with Celtic in 2018

Personal information
- Full name: Dorus de Vries
- Date of birth: 29 December 1980 (age 45)
- Place of birth: Amsterdam, Netherlands
- Height: 1.86 m (6 ft 1 in)
- Position: Goalkeeper

Youth career
- De Kennemers
- Beverwijk

Senior career*
| Years | Team | Apps | (Gls) |
| 1999–2003 | Telstar | 81 | (0) |
| 2003–2006 | ADO Den Haag | 69 | (0) |
| 2006–2007 | Dunfermline Athletic | 23 | (0) |
| 2007–2011 | Swansea City | 181 | (0) |
| 2011–2013 | Wolverhampton Wanderers | 14 | (0) |
| 2013–2016 | Nottingham Forest | 53 | (0) |
| 2016–2019 | Celtic | 10 | (0) |
| Total | | 431 | (0) |
- * Club domestic league appearances and goals

Dorus de Vries (born 29 December 1980) is a Dutch former professional footballer who played as a goalkeeper.

De Vries began his professional career in his native the Netherlands with Telstar, before spending three seasons with ADO Den Haag. He moved to Britain in 2006, when he spent a season at Scottish club Dunfermline Athletic. before moving to Swansea City where he spent four seasons, culminating in promotion to the Premier League in 2011. He rejected a new deal with Swansea to instead join Wolverhampton Wanderers, with whom he spent two seasons largely as back-up. De Vries then signed for Nottingham Forest in July 2013. He retired from football in 2019, after three seasons with Celtic.

== Career ==
=== Early career in Netherlands ===
De Vries began his professional career at Telstar, making his first team debut during the 1999–2000 season. He remained with the club in the second tier of Dutch football until 2003, when he signed for Eredivisie side ADO Den Haag.

After mostly serving as back-up to Roland Jansen, he took over as number one during the 2004–05 campaign. However, this status proved short lived as the loan capture of Jaroslav Drobný during 2006 pushed De Vries aside, and he was told that he would not be offered a new contract.

=== Dunfermline Athletic ===
In the summer of 2006, following a successful trial, he signed a contract with Scottish Premier League club Dunfermline Athletic. He made his debut in a 0–0 draw with Ayr United in the second round of the Scottish League Cup, saving a penalty to take the match to extra time before going on to win in a penalty shoot-out. On 11 May 2007, he palmed a tame free kick into his own net against Inverness Caledonian Thistle to end Dunfermline's seven-year stay in the Scottish Premier League. However, following the match, Dunfermline manager Stephen Kenny refused to blame De Vries for his team's relegation, stating: "We can attach absolutely no blame to him because he has been out of this world this season." His final match for the club came in the 2007 Scottish Cup Final defeat to Celtic.

=== Swansea City ===
After becoming a free agent at the end of his contract, De Vries signed a two-year deal at Swansea City on 6 July 2007. In his first season with the Welsh side he helped the club to the League One title, as the club's first choice goalkeeper.

In the 2009–10 season, De Vries surpassed Roger Freestone's club record of 22 clean sheets in a single season with a shut-out against Scunthorpe United on 5 April 2010. He would go on to finish the season with 25 clean sheets, winning the Football League's Golden Glove award for the Championship in the process.

The following season, he was part of the team that won the Championship Play-off Final, against Reading, to reach the Premier League. Initially, De Vries stated that he wanted to stay with the club for their first Premier League season. However, he rejected their contract offer shortly after and was subsequently signed by Wolverhampton Wanderers.

=== Wolverhampton Wanderers ===
On 22 June 2011, it was confirmed that free agent De Vries had joined Premier League side Wolverhampton Wanderers, signing a three-year contract. At Wolves, De Vries primarily served as back-up to Wayne Hennessey and initially only gained playing time in cup competitions. He made his club debut on 23 August 2011 in a 4–0 League Cup win at Northampton Town.

When first choice goalkeeper Hennessey suffered a torn cruciate knee ligament in April 2012, De Vries made his first-ever Premier League appearance. However, by this stage Wolves had become rooted in the relegation zone and the 0–2 defeat against eventual champions Manchester City on De Vries' league debut confirmed their relegation back to the Championship. De Vries remained in the Wolves' goal for their remaining fixtures, including a trip to his former club Swansea, before which he said that he has no regrets about his decision to leave Swansea and join Wolves; he received mixed reception from Swansea fans and went on to concede four times in a 4–4 draw.

Following relegation, De Vries was a target for Liverpool following their appointment of former Swansea manager Brendan Rodgers as manager, but their bid of a reported £500,000 was not accepted. With the new season beginning with Wayne Hennessey still sidelined through injury, new Wolves manager Ståle Solbakken opted to instead start with Carl Ikeme in goal. His only start under Solbakken came in a League Cup loss at Chelsea, during which the goalkeeper conceded six times. In late October Solbakken admitted that he and De Vries had had an angry confrontation regarding his lack of opportunities.

For a second consecutive season his chance to play league football only arrived through injury, when Ikeme suffered a self-inflicted broken hand in March 2013. He played in all of Wolves' remaining fixtures as the team again struggled unsuccessfully to avoid relegation under another manager, Dean Saunders. Following relegation to League One, Saunders was fired and replaced by Kenny Jackett, who has stated that De Vries was free to leave on a free transfer as he sought to slim down the squad.

=== Nottingham Forest ===
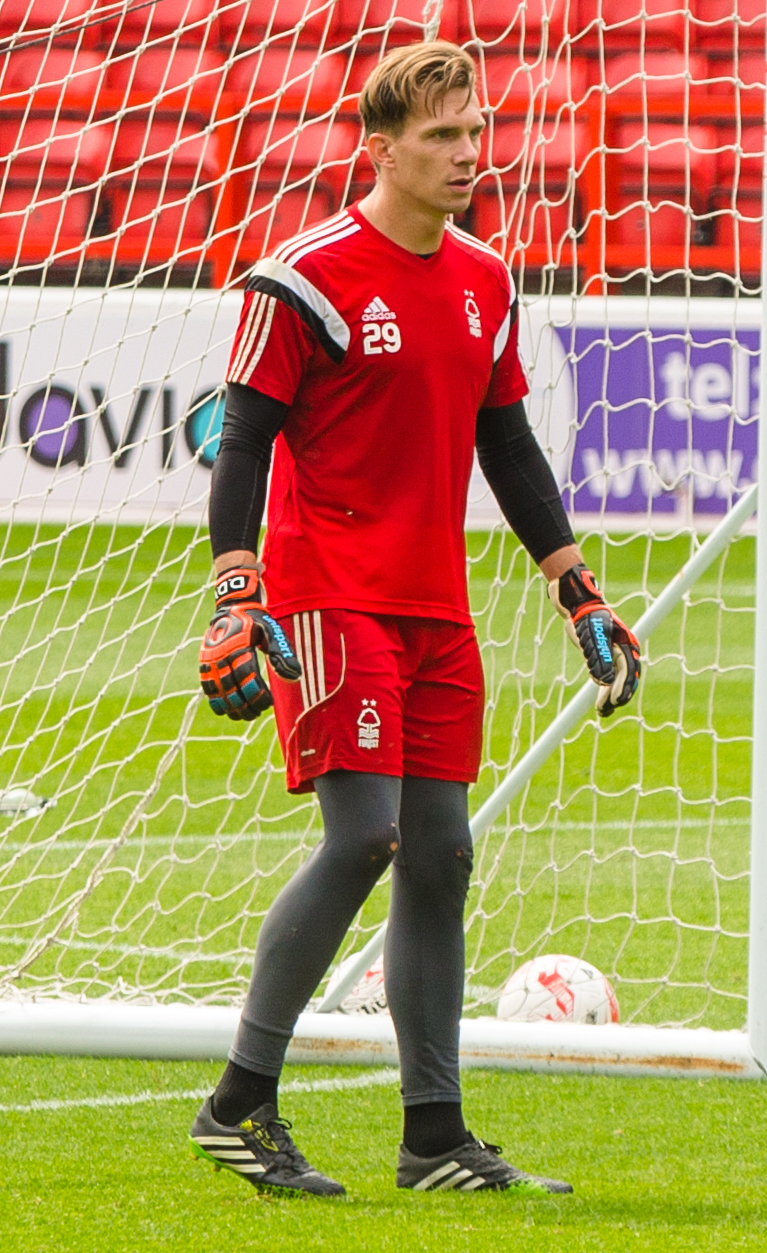
De Vries in training with Nottingham Forest, 2014

On 3 July 2013, De Vries signed a two-year deal with Championship club Nottingham Forest. Upon joining the club, De Vries stated the move wouldn't be easy for him over a first choice goalkeeper. De Vries was given the number 29 shirt.

In his first season at Nottingham Forest, De Vries was primarily second choice goalkeeper behind Karl Darlow throughout the season, making his debut for the club on 21 April 2014 in a 2–1 win over Leeds United, and remained in goal for the remainder of the season with Darlow injured. De Vries was again second choice in 2014–2015, eventually displacing Darlow for a spell including the 2–1 derby win over Derby County, but Darlow was re-instated by Dougie Freedman, immediately on replacing Stuart Pearce as manager.

Following Darlow's move to Newcastle United, De Vries was promoted to first-choice goalkeeper for the 2015–16 season and took the number one shirt. He played in all but one of Forest's league matches, missing the away fixture against Sheffield Wednesday with a back injury. On 1 May 2016 De Vries was voted Player of the Season for 2015–16 by Forest's supporters after a consistent year in goal, which included a hat-trick of Player of the Month awards for August, February and March. He also saved all three of the penalties he faced during the season.

De Vries made one appearance for Forest in the 2016–17 season: on opening day in a 4–3 victory over Burton Albion. He suffered a knee injury and was replaced by new signing Stephen Henderson.

=== Celtic ===
On 13 August 2016, De Vries signed a two-year deal with Celtic. He made his debut on 27 August, playing the full match in Celtic's 4–1 win over Aberdeen at Celtic Park. He played in his first Old Firm match on 10 September, in only his second appearance, as Celtic beat Rangers 5–1. Three days later he made his European debut, in a 7–0 defeat to Barcelona at Camp Nou in the UEFA Champions League. After playing the full ninety minutes of the 2–2 draw away at Inverness Caledonian Thistle, de Vries was substituted at half-time against Kilmarnock on 24 September, replaced by Craig Gordon; this was his last appearance of the 2016–17 season.

De Vries made only one appearance in the entire 2017 calendar year: a 1–0 win over Dundee on 14 October. On 27 January 2018, De Vries replaced Gordon at half-time shortly after the latter suffered a knee injury in the 1–0 win over Hibernian. This gave De Vries an extended run in the side, taking in Scottish Premiership clashes with Aberdeen, Hearts, Kilmarnock, and St Johnstone, Scottish Cup victories over first Partick Thistle and then Greenock Morton, and De Vries' UEFA Europa League début, which came against Zenit Saint Petersburg. Celtic exited the Europa League after a 3–1 aggregate defeat to Zenit; the Russians' second goal, described by De Vries as a "knuckleball", deceived him, and it is his belief that his side never recovered from that concession. De Vries was injured in training on 9 March and replaced by Scott Bain in the match with Rangers two days later, and made no further appearances in the 2017–18 season, finishing with 10 appearances: two in the Scottish Cup, two in the Europa League, and six in the League.

De Vries left Celtic at the end of the 2018–19 season, and then announced his retirement from football.

== Career statistics ==
Appearances and goals by club, season and competition
| Club | Season | League | | | National cup | | League cup | | Other | | Total | |
| Club | Season | Division | Apps | Goals | Apps | Goals | Apps | Goals | Apps | Goals | Apps | Goals |
|---|---|---|---|---|---|---|---|---|---|---|---|---|
| ADO Den Haag | 2003–04 | Eredivisie | 18 | 0 | 0 | 0 | — | | — | | 18 | 0 |
| ADO Den Haag | 2004–05 | Eredivisie | 31 | 0 | 1 | 0 | — | | — | | 32 | 0 |
| ADO Den Haag | 2005–06 | Eredivisie | 20 | 0 | 0 | 0 | — | | — | | 20 | 0 |
| ADO Den Haag | Total | | 69 | 0 | 1 | 0 | — | | — | | 70 | 0 |
| Dunfermline Athletic | 2006–07 | Scottish Premier League | 27 | 0 | 5 | 0 | 2 | 0 | — | | 34 | 0 |
| Swansea City | 2007–08 | League One | 46 | 0 | 4 | 0 | 2 | 0 | 6 (Note: Appearance(s) in Football League Trophy) | 0 | 58 | 0 |
| Swansea City | 2008–09 | Championship | 40 | 0 | 3 | 0 | 3 | 0 | — | | 46 | 0 |
| Swansea City | 2009–10 | Championship | 46 | 0 | 1 | 0 | 1 | 0 | — | | 48 | 0 |
| Swansea City | 2010–11 | Championship | 46 | 0 | 0 | 0 | 2 | 0 | 3 (Note: Appearance(s) in Football League play-offs) | 0 | 51 | 0 |
| Swansea City | Total | | 178 | 0 | 8 | 0 | 8 | 0 | 9 | 0 | 203 | 0 |
| Wolverhampton Wanderers | 2011–12 | Premier League | 4 | 0 | 2 | 0 | 3 | 0 | — | | 9 | 0 |
| Wolverhampton Wanderers | 2012–13 | Championship | 10 | 0 | 0 | 0 | 1 | 0 | — | | 11 | 0 |
| Wolverhampton Wanderers | Total | | 14 | 0 | 2 | 0 | 4 | 0 | — | | 20 | 0 |
| Nottingham Forest | 2013–14 | Championship | 3 | 0 | 2 | 0 | 3 | 0 | — | | 8 | 0 |
| Nottingham Forest | 2014–15 | Championship | 4 | 0 | 1 | 0 | 1 | 0 | — | | 6 | 0 |
| Nottingham Forest | 2015–16 | Championship | 45 | 0 | 2 | 0 | 1 | 0 | — | | 48 | 0 |
| Nottingham Forest | 2016–17 | Championship | 1 | 0 | 0 | 0 | 0 | 0 | — | | 1 | 0 |
| Nottingham Forest | Total | | 53 | 0 | 5 | 0 | 5 | 0 | — | | 63 | 0 |
| Celtic | 2016–17 | Scottish Premiership | 4 | 0 | 0 | 0 | 0 | 0 | 1 (Note: Appearance(s) in UEFA Champions League) | 0 | 5 | 0 |
| Celtic | 2017–18 | Scottish Premiership | 6 | 0 | 2 | 0 | 0 | 0 | 2 (Note: Appearance(s) in UEFA Europa League) | 0 | 10 | 0 |
| Celtic | 2018–19 | Scottish Premiership | 0 | 0 | 0 | 0 | 0 | 0 | 0 | 0 | 0 | 0 |
| Celtic | Total | | 10 | 0 | 2 | 0 | 0 | 0 | 3 | 0 | 15 | 0 |
| Career total | | | 347 | 0 | 23 | 0 | 18 | 0 | 14 | 0 | 401 | 0 |

== Honours ==
Swansea City

- Football League Championship play-offs: 2011
- Football League One: 2007–08

Celtic

- Scottish Cup: 2016–17, 2018–19
- Scottish League Cup: 2016–17, 2017–18

Individual

- Championship Golden Glove: 2009–10
- Nottingham Forest Player of the Year: 2016
