= Gorka Pintado =

Spanish footballer

Personal information
- Full name: Gorka Pintado del Molino
- Date of birth: 24 March 1978 (age 48)
- Place of birth: San Sebastián, Spain
- Height: 1.82 m (6 ft 0 in)
- Position: Striker

Youth career
- Arrobi Berri
- Sporting Herrera

Senior career*
Years	Team	Apps	(Gls)
1999–2001	Real Unión	35	(3)
2001–2002	Osasuna B	34	(11)
2002–2003	Leganés	16	(0)
2004–2005	Figueres	37	(7)
2005–2007	Gramenet	71	(33)
2007–2008	Granada	33	(18)
2008–2011	Swansea City	73	(7)
2011	→ AEK Larnaca (loan)	6	(4)
2011–2014	AEK Larnaca	61	(17)
2014–2015	Atarfe Industrial		
Total		366	(100)
- * Club domestic league appearances and goals

Gorka Pintado del Molino (born 24 March 1978) is a Spanish retired footballer who played as a striker.

== Football career ==
Pintado was born in San Sebastián, Gipuzkoa. During his Spanish career he played mostly in the third division, having an unassuming spell in the second level with CD Leganés (no goals scored in nearly two full seasons).

On 6 June 2008, at already 30, Pintado signed with Swansea City from Granada CF for a fee of around €200,000, after netting 18 goals during the campaign. At the Welsh side he hooked up with compatriots Guillem Bauzà, Jordi Gómez, Roberto Martínez (coach), Àngel Rangel and Albert Serrán, and he scored his first league goal for them during a 3–1 win over Nottingham Forest, at the Liberty Stadium.

Although limited to substitute appearances, Pintado netted his second goal of the season in Swansea's 2–2 draw at home to Cardiff City, volleying home for the equaliser. He went on to score three more times, against Southampton, Derby County and Crystal Palace.

On 6 January 2011, Pintado moved to Cypriot First Division club AEK Larnaca FC on loan until June. On 23 August, the move was made permanent.
