= Casey Thomas =

Welsh footballer

Personal information
- Date of birth: 14 November 1990 (age 35)
- Place of birth: Port Talbot, Wales
- Height: 5 ft 9 in (1.75 m)
- Position: Winger

Team information
- Current team: Port Talbot Town

Youth career
- Afan Lido
- Swansea City

Senior career*
Years	Team	Apps	(Gls)
2009–2012	Swansea City	1	(0)
2009	→ Newport County (loan)	1	(0)
2011	→ Port Talbot Town (loan)	10	(0)
2011	→ Colchester United (loan)	2	(0)
2012–13	Carmarthen Town	13	(2)
2013–14	Afan Lido	22	(0)
2014–2015	Port Talbot Town	13	(0)
2015–	Moreland City	10	(4)

International career^{‡}
- Wales U17
2008	Wales U19	2	(1)
2009	Wales U21	3	(0)
- * Club domestic league appearances and goals as of 14:45, 23 May 2015 (UTC) ‡ National team caps and goals as of 16:46, 4 November 2011 (UTC)

Casey Elliot Thomas (born 14 November 1990) is a Welsh footballer and Wales under-21 international who plays as a winger for Moreland City FC.

== Club career ==
Thomas made his professional debut for Swansea City in a Championship match against Middlesbrough in the 3–0 loss on 15 August 2009, replacing Mark Gower as a substitute in the 62nd minute. In October 2009, Thomas joined Conference South side Newport County on a one-month loan deal. He made one appearance as a substitute during a 1–0 defeat to Staines Town on 27 October, after which he returned to Swansea City. In January 2011, Thomas moved to Port Talbot Town on loan. On 4 November 2011, he joined League One club Colchester United on loan until 2 January 2012. Thomas was released in May 2012 and joined Carmarthen Town of the Welsh Premier League. In September 2013, Thomas signed for fellow Welsh Premier League club Afan Lido. Following Afan Lido's relegation from the Welsh Premier in 2014, Thomas joined rival club Port Talbot Town.

In February 2015, Thomas moved with his brother Corey to Australia to join Moreland City FC.

== International career ==
Thomas has represented Wales under-17 and Wales under-19, where he played twice scoring one goal. He was called up to the under-21 squad, to face Luxembourg under-21 in March 2009.
