= Matthew Collins (Welsh footballer) =

Welsh footballer

Personal information
- Full name: Matthew Jeffrey Collins
- Date of birth: 31 March 1986 (age 40)
- Place of birth: Merthyr Tydfil, Wales
- Height: 1.78 m (5 ft 10 in)
- Position: Midfielder

Team information
- Current team: Hungerford Town
- Number: 9

Youth career
- –2001: Swindon Town
- 2001–2006: Fulham

Senior career*
Years	Team	Apps	(Gls)
2006–2007	Fulham	0	(0)
2007–2010	Swansea City	11	(0)
2007	→ Wrexham (loan)	4	(0)
2010–2011	Haverfordwest County	19	(2)
2011–2012	Neath	28	(8)
2012–2013	Aberystwyth Town	22	(5)
2013–2014	Carmarthen Town	23	(3)
2014	Mangotsfield United	12	(1)
2014–	Hungerford Town	23	(0)

International career
200?–2003	Wales U17		
200?–2005	Wales U19	7	(4)
2006–2007	Wales U21	3	(2)
- * Club domestic league appearances and goals as of 18:37, 21 September 2010 (UTC)

Matthew Jeffrey Collins (born 31 March 1986) is a Welsh footballer who plays for Hungerford Town. He has represented Wales at Under-17, Under-19 and Under-21 levels, and plays as a central midfielder and also as a right back.

== Career ==
Born in Merthyr Tydfil, Collins started his career at Swindon Town but Jean Tigana and his Fulham scouts were impressed by him and he signed for the club in the summer of 2001 for a fee in excess of £250,000. Two years later, Collins signed his first professional contract with the club. During a pre season tour to Germany in the 2005–06 season, Collins sustained a hamstring injury, this was a start of a nightmare season as he had recurring hamstring tears which kept him out for an 18-month period. He did not break into the first team at Fulham and signed for League One side Swansea City on a free transfer in May 2007 on a two-year deal. In his first season, he was part of the squad that gained promotion to the Championship winning the League One Title. He joined League Two side Wrexham on a one-month loan deal in November 2007. He made his debut against Shrewsbury Town, playing a full 90 minutes. He returned to Swansea after playing four times for the Dragons. Following an impressive pre-season Roberto Martínez started Collins in Swansea's first Championship match of the 2008–2009 campaign and the following two matches. Collins was rewarded for his good performances by John Toshack as the Welsh manager put the 22-year-old on the bench for the international friendly against Georgia. On 11 August 2010, Collins left Swansea City by mutual consent in a search for regular football.

After leaving Swansea, Collins joined Welsh Premier League side Haverfordwest County. He was only with the Pembrokeshire outfit for 6 months and Collins was transferred to big spending Neath to join up with former Swansea colleagues Lee Trundle and Kristian O'Leary. In his first season at Neath he was part of the side that won the Welsh Premier League play-off final. Collins went on to play in the UEFA Europa League against top flight Swedish side Aalesunds FK, however Neath were unsuccessful progressing to the next stage of the competition.

In June 2012 he joined Aberystwyth Town following the liquidation of Neath.
