= 2015–16 Swansea City A.F.C. season =

Swansea City
2015–16 season
- Chairman: Huw Jenkins
- Manager: Garry Monk (until 9 December 2015); Alan Curtis (caretaker, 9 December–18 January); Francesco Guidolin (from 18 January)
- Stadium: Liberty Stadium
- Premier League: 12th
- FA Cup: Third round
- League Cup: Third round
- Top goalscorer: League: André Ayew (12); All: André Ayew (12)
- Highest home attendance: 20,972 vs. Liverpool (1 May 2016, Premier League)
- Lowest home attendance: 10,174 vs. York City (25 August 2015, League Cup)
- Average home league attendance: 20,711
Home colours	Away colours

The 2015–16 season was Swansea City's 96th season in the English football league system, and their fifth consecutive season in the Premier League. Along with competing in the Premier League, the club also participated in the FA Cup and League Cup. The season covered the period from 1 July 2015 to 30 June 2016.

== Squad and coaching staff information ==
=== First team squad ===
N	Pos.	Nat.	Name	Age	EU	Since	App	Goals	Ends	Transfer fee	Notes
1	GK	(Poland)	Łukasz Fabiański	31	EU	2014	75	0	2019	Free	
2	DF	(Spain)	Jordi Amat	25	EU	2013	53	0	2019	£2,500,000	
3	DF	(Wales)	Neil Taylor	27	EU	2010	166	0	2019	£150,000	
4	MF	(South Korea)	Ki Sung-yueng	27	Non-EU	2012	105	10	2018	£5,500,000	
6	DF	(Wales) (England)	Ashley Williams	31	EU	2008	352	14	2018	£400,000	Captain
7	MF	(England)	Leon Britton	33	EU	2011	521	17	2017	Undisclosed	Appearances including FAW Premier Cup
8	MF	(Netherlands)	Leroy Fer	26	EU	2016	11	0	2016	Loan	
9	FW	(Italy)	Alberto Paloschi	26	EU	2016	10	2	2019	Undisclosed	
10	FW	(Ghana) (France)	André Ayew	26	EU	2015	35	12	2019	Free	
11	FW	(Netherlands)	Marvin Emnes	27	EU	2014	38	6	2017	Undisclosed	
13	GK	(Sweden)	Kristoffer Nordfeldt	26	EU	2015	4	0	2018	£600,000	
15	MF	(England)	Wayne Routledge	31	EU	2011	183	18	2018	Undisclosed	
18	FW	(France)	Bafétimbi Gomis	30	EU	2014	71	17	2018	Free	
20	MF	(Ecuador)	Jefferson Montero	26	Non-EU	2014	58	2	2018	Undisclosed	
22	DF	(Spain)	Àngel Rangel	33	EU	2007	346	9	2017	Undisclosed	
23	MF	(Iceland)	Gylfi Sigurðsson	26	EU	2014	91	27	2018	Undisclosed	
24	MF	(England)	Jack Cork	26	EU	2015	51	2	2018	Undisclosed	
26	DF	(England)	Kyle Naughton	27	EU	2015	38	0	2018	Undisclosed	
27	DF	(England)	Kyle Bartley	24	EU	2012	26	0	2017	£1,000,000	
32	DF	(Wales)	Liam Shephard	21	EU	2013	1	0	2017	Youth system	
33	DF	(Argentina) (Italy)	Federico Fernández	27	EU	2014	64	1	2018	Undisclosed	
35	DF	(Scotland)	Stephen Kingsley	21	EU	2014	5	0	2017	Undisclosed	
56	MF	(Scotland)	Jay Fulton	22	EU	2014 (Winter)	9	0	2018	Undisclosed	
58	FW	(The Gambia) (Sweden)	Modou Barrow	23	EU	2014	36	2	2018	Undisclosed	

Updated to match played 15 May 2016
Source: Swansea City A.F.C.
Ordered by 2015–16 squad numbers.

== Transfers ==
=== Transfers in ===
Date from	Position	Nationality	Name	From	Fee	Contract length	Expiry date	Ref.
1 July 2015	FW	GHA	André Ayew	Marseille	Free transfer	4 years	June 2019	
1 July 2015	DF	FRA	Franck Tabanou	Saint-Étienne	£3,500,000	3 years	June 2018	
1 July 2015	GK	SWE	Kristoffer Nordfeldt	Heerenveen	£600,000	3 years	June 2018	
1 July 2015	FW	POR	Éder	Braga	£5,000,000	3 years	June 2018	
9 July 2015	MF	IRL	Tom Holland	Manchester City	Free transfer	1 year	June 2016	
13 July 2015	FW	SCO	Oli McBurnie	Bradford City	Undisclosed	3 years	June 2018	
11 August 2015	GK	GER	Gerhard Tremmel	Free agent	Free transfer	2 years	June 2017	
12 August 2015	GK	ENG	Josh Vickers	Arsenal	Free transfer	2 years	June 2017	
17 August 2015	FW	SCO	Botti Biabi	Falkirk	Undisclosed	3 years	June 2018	
27 January 2016	MF	SCO	Ryan Blair	Falkirk	Undisclosed	3.5 years	June 2019	
29 January 2016	FW	ITA	Alberto Paloschi	Chievo	Undisclosed	3.5 years	June 2019	

Total outgoing: ▼£9,100,000

=== Transfers out ===
Date from	Position	Nationality	Name	To	Fee	Ref.
1 July 2015	DF	WAL	Tom Atyeo	Free agent	Released	
1 July 2015	GK	WAL	David Cornell	Oldham Athletic (Note: Following Cornell's release on 28 May 2015, he later joined Oldham Athletic on 11 July 2015.)	Released	
1 July 2015	FW	NIR	Rory Donnelly	Gillingham (Note: Following Donnelly's release on 28 May 2015, he later joined Gillingham on 26 June 2015.)	Free transfer	
1 July 2015	DF	WAL	Corey Francis	Free agent	Released	
1 July 2015	MF	AUS	Giancarlo Gallifuoco	Melbourne Victory (Note: Following Gallifuoco's release on 28 May 2015, he later joined Melbourne Victory on 29 September 2015.)	Free transfer	
1 July 2015	DF	WAL	Joseph Jones	Port Talbot Town (Note: Following their release on 28 May 2015, March, Jones and Loveridge later joined Port Talbot Town.)	Free	
1 July 2015	MF	WAL	Kurtis March	Port Talbot Town	Free transfer	
1 July 2015	DF	ENG	Curtis Obeng	Free agent	Released	
1 July 2015	GK	WAL	Gareth Owen	Free agent	Released	
1 July 2015	DF	WAL	Scott Tancock	Free agent	Released	
1 July 2015	DF	ENG	Alan Tate	Free agent	Released	
1 July 2015	FW	WAL	James Loveridge	Port Talbot Town	Free transfer	
1 July 2015	GK	GER	Gerhard Tremmel	Swansea City (Note: Following Tremmel's release on 1 July 2015, he later re-signed for Swansea City on 11 August 2015.)	Released	
2 July 2015	DF	WAL	Jazz Richards	Fulham	£500,000	
1 September 2015	DF	NED	Dwight Tiendalli	Free agent	Released	
12 January 2016	MF	ENG	Jonjo Shelvey	Newcastle United	Undisclosed	

Total incoming: ▲£500,000

=== Loans out ===
Date from	Position	Nationality	Name	To	Expiry date	Ref.
6 July 2015	MF	SCO	Adam King	Crewe Alexandra	5 January 2016	
9 July 2015	FW	NED	Kenji Gorré	ADO Den Haag	30 January 2016	(Note: On 30 January 2016, Swansea exercised the option to recall Gorré from his loan spell.)
8 August 2015	DF	WAL	Connor Roberts	Yeovil Town	End of season	(Note: On 6 January 2016, Roberts' loan at Yeovil was extended until the end of the season.)
10 August 2015	MF	GAM	Modou Barrow	Blackburn Rovers	8 September 2015	(Note: On 8 September 2015, Swansea exercised the option to recall Barrow from his loan spell.)
11 August 2015	GK	WAL	Oliver Davies	Kilmarnock	16 January 2016	
26 August 2015	DF	SCO	Stephen Kingsley	Crewe Alexandra	25 November 2015	
1 September 2015	FW	WAL	Alex Samuel	Greenock Morton	End of season	(Note: On 9 January 2016, Samuel's loan at Morton was extended until the end of the season.)
1 September 2015	MF	ENG	Nathan Dyer	Leicester City	End of season	
18 September 2015	MF	SCO	Jay Fulton	Oldham Athletic	19 December 2015	
26 September 2015	MF	WAL	Josh Sheehan	Yeovil Town	28 December 2015	
26 November 2015	FW	SCO	Oli McBurnie	Newport County	24 December 2015	(Note: On 24 December 2015, Swansea exercised the option to recall McBurnie from his loan spell.)
20 January 2016	MF	NIR	Stephen Fallon	Linfield	End of season	
21 January 2016	DF	FRA	Franck Tabanou	Saint-Étienne	End of season	
28 January 2016	GK	GER	Gerhard Tremmel	Werder Bremen	End of season	
1 February 2016	FW	POR	Éder	Lille	End of season	
1 February 2016	DF	WAL	Daniel Alfei	Mansfield Town	End of season	
1 February 2016	DF	WAL	Ryan Hedges	Stevenage	1 April 2016	
13 February 2016	MF	ENG	Matt Grimes	Blackburn Rovers	13 May 2016	
2 March 2016	MF	IRE	Tom Holland	Eastleigh	End of season	
15 March 2016	FW	AUS	James Demetriou	Wealdstone	End of season	
24 March 2016	DF	WAL	Liam Shephard	Yeovil Town	24 April 2016	

=== Loans in ===
Date from	Position	Nationality	Name	From	Expiry date	Ref.
1 February 2016	CM	NED	Leroy Fer	Queens Park Rangers	30 June 2016	

=== New contracts ===
Date signed	Position	Nationality	Name	Contract length	Expiry date	Ref.
2 July 2015	MF	WAL	Josh Sheehan	Extension	June 2017	
3 July 2015	DF	WAL	Joe Rodon	2 years	June 2017	
3 July 2015	GK	WAL	Lewis Thomas	2 years	June 2017	
3 July 2015	GK	WAL	Oliver Davies	2 years	June 2017	
6 July 2015	FW	NED	Kenji Gorré	3 years	June 2018	
6 July 2015	MF	WAL	Lee Lucas	1 year	June 2016	
6 July 2015	MF	WAL	Henry Jones	1 year	June 2016	
6 July 2015	MF	WAL	Sam Evans	1 year	June 2016	
6 July 2015	MF	WAL	Alex Bray	1 year	June 2016	
6 July 2015	FW	WAL	Alex Samuel	1 year	June 2016	
6 July 2015	GK	SVN	Gregor Zabret	1 year	June 2016	
8 July 2015	MF	ENG	Jonjo Shelvey	4 years	June 2019	
15 July 2015	DF	CYP	Alex Gogic	1 year	June 2016	
6 August 2015	GK	POL	Łukasz Fabiański	4 years	June 2019	
30 January 2016	DF	ESP	Jordi Amat	Extension	June 2019	
17 February 2016	DF	WAL	Keston Davies	Extension	June 2018	
17 February 2016	MF	WAL	Daniel James	3 years	June 2019	
3 March 2016	MF	WAL	Alex Bray	Extension	June 2017	
8 March 2016	MF	SWE	Adnan Marić	3 years	June 2019	
6 April 2016	MF	WAL	Kieran Evans	2 year	June 2017	
14 April 2016	MF	WAL	Tom Dyson	1 year	June 2017	
14 April 2016	MF	WAL	Jack Evans	1 year	June 2017	
14 April 2016	DF	WAL	Aaron Lewis	1 year	June 2017	
5 May 2016	FW	WAL	Liam Cullen	2 years	June 2018	

== Pre-season friendlies ==
On 29 April 2015, it was announced that Swansea City would feature in a Texas tournament in July. Subsequently, it was announced that this tournament had been cancelled. On 29 May, Swansea announced they will face Reading at Adams Park on 24 July. Swansea announced that they will travel to Germany to face Borussia Mönchengladbach and 1860 Munich. A trip to Nottingham Forest was added on 22 June.

15 July 2015 Friendly	Borussia Mönchengladbach	1–1	Swansea City	Grassau
17:00 BST (UTC+01:00)	Traoré 14'	Report	Grimes 68'	Stadium: ASV Grassau; Referee: Felix Brych

18 July 2015 Friendly	1860 Munich	1–2	Swansea City	Munich
18:00 BST (UTC+01:00)	Adlung 64' (pen.)	Report	Cork 8'; Gomis 73'	Stadium: Grünwalder Stadion; Referee: Felix Brych

24 July 2015 Friendly	Reading	1–1	Swansea City	High Wycombe
19:45 BST (UTC+01:00)	Blackman 46'	Report	Bartley 48'	Stadium: Adams Park; Attendance: 1,284; Referee: Iain Williamson

25 July 2015 Friendly	Nottingham Forest	1–1	Swansea City	Nottingham
15:00 BST (UTC+01:00)	Tesche 68'	Report	Ayew 59'	Stadium: City Ground; Referee: Christopher Kavanagh

1 August 2015 Friendly	Swansea City	0–0	Deportivo La Coruña	Swansea
17:30 BST (UTC+01:00)		Report		Stadium: Liberty Stadium; Attendance: 12,292; Referee: Lee Evans

== Competitions ==
=== Overview ===
Competition	First match	Last match	Starting round	Final position	Record							
Competition	First match	Last match	Starting round	Final position	Pld	W	D	L	GF	GA	GD	Win %
Premier League	8 August 2015	15 May 2016	—	12th	38	12	11	15	42	52	−10	31.58
FA Cup	9 January 2016		Third round	Third round	1	0	0	1	2	3	−1	0.00
League Cup	25 August 2015	22 September 2015	Second round	Third round	2	1	0	1	3	1	+2	50.00
Total					41	13	11	17	47	56	−9	31.71

Last updated: 15 May 2016
Source: Competitions

=== Premier League ===
==== League table ====
Pos	Team	Pld	W	D	L	GF	GA	GD	Pts
10	Chelsea	38	12	14	12	59	53	+6	50
11	Everton	38	11	14	13	59	55	+4	47
12	Swansea City	38	12	11	15	42	52	−10	47
13	Watford	38	12	9	17	40	50	−10	45
14	West Bromwich Albion	38	10	13	15	34	48	−14	43

Source: Barclays Premier League
Rules for classification: 1) Points; 2) Goal difference; 3) Goals scored; 4) Play-offs (only if needed to decide champion, teams for relegation or teams for UEFA competitions).

==== Results summary ====
Overall								Home						Away					
Pld	W	D	L	GF	GA	GD	Pts	W	D	L	GF	GA	GD	W	D	L	GF	GA	GD
38	12	11	15	42	52	−10	47	8	6	5	20	20	0	4	5	10	22	32	−10

Last updated: 15 May 2016.
Source: Premier League

==== Results by matchday ====
Matchday	1	2	3	4	5	6	7	8	9	10	11	12	13	14	15	16	17	18	19	20	21	22	23	24	25	26	27	28	29	30	31	32	33	34	35	36	37	38
Ground	A	H	A	H	A	H	A	H	H	A	H	A	H	A	H	A	H	H	A	A	H	H	A	A	H	H	A	A	H	A	H	A	H	A	A	H	A	H
Result	D	W	D	W	L	D	L	D	L	W	L	L	D	L	L	L	D	W	D	L	L	W	W	D	D	L	L	W	W	L	W	D	W	L	L	W	W	D
Position	5	4	6	4	7	7	11	11	14	11	13	14	14	15	15	16	18	16	17	17	17	17	15	16	16	16	16	16	16	16	15	15	12	15	15	13	11	12

Updated to match(es) played on 15 May 2016. Source: Statto
A = Away; H = Home; W = Win; D = Draw; L = Loss

==== Matches ====
Win Draw Loss Postponed

The fixture list for the 2015–16 Premier League season was announced on 17 June 2015.

8 August 2015 1	Chelsea	2–2	Swansea City	Fulham
17:30 BST (UTC+01:00)	Oscar 23'; Fernández 30' (o.g.); Courtois (red card) 52'	Report	Ayew 29'; Gomis 55' (pen.)	Stadium: Stamford Bridge; Attendance: 41,232; Referee: Michael Oliver

15 August 2015 2	Swansea City	2–0	Newcastle United	Swansea
15:00 BST (UTC+01:00)	Gomis 9'; Ayew 52'	Report	Janmaat (red card) 41'	Stadium: Liberty Stadium; Attendance: 20,678; Referee: Mike Jones

22 August 2015 3	Sunderland	1–1	Swansea City	Sunderland
15:00 BST (UTC+01:00)	Defoe 62'	Report	Gomis 45+3'	Stadium: Stadium of Light; Attendance: 39,198; Referee: Neil Swarbrick

30 August 2015 4	Swansea City	2–1	Manchester United	Swansea
16:00 BST (UTC+01:00)	Ayew 61'; Gomis 66'	Report	Mata 48'	Stadium: Liberty Stadium; Attendance: 20,828; Referee: Martin Atkinson

12 September 2015 5	Watford	1–0	Swansea City	Watford
15:00 BST (UTC+01:00)	Ighalo 59'; Behrami (red card) 64'	Report		Stadium: Vicarage Road; Attendance: 20,057; Referee: Robert Madley

19 September 2015 6	Swansea City	0–0	Everton	Swansea
15:00 BST (UTC+01:00)		Report	Mirallas (red card) 90'	Stadium: Liberty Stadium; Attendance: 20,805; Referee: Stuart Attwell

26 September 2015 7	Southampton	3–1	Swansea City	Southampton
15:00 BST (UTC+01:00)	Van Dijk 11'; Ki 54' (o.g.); Mané 61'	Report	Sigurðsson 83' (pen.)	Stadium: St Mary's Stadium; Attendance: 30,704; Referee: Roger East

4 October 2015 8	Swansea City	2–2	Tottenham Hotspur	Swansea
16:00 BST (UTC+01:00)	Ayew 16'; Kane 31' (o.g.)	Report	Eriksen 27', 65'	Stadium: Liberty Stadium; Attendance: 20,845; Referee: Mike Dean

19 October 2015 9	Swansea City	0–1	Stoke City	Swansea
20:00 BST (UTC+01:00)		Report	Bojan 4' (pen.)	Stadium: Liberty Stadium; Attendance: 20,044; Referee: Robert Madley

24 October 2015 10	Aston Villa	1–2	Swansea City	Birmingham
15:00 BST (UTC+01:00)	J. Ayew 62'	Report	Sigurðsson 68'; A. Ayew 87'	Stadium: Villa Park; Attendance: 33,324; Referee: Neil Swarbrick

31 October 2015 11	Swansea City	0–3	Arsenal	Swansea
15:00 GMT (UTC+00:00)		Report	Giroud 49'; Koscielny 68'; Campbell 73'	Stadium: Liberty Stadium; Attendance: 20,937; Referee: Kevin Friend

7 November 2015 12	Norwich City	1–0	Swansea City	Norwich
15:00 GMT (UTC+00:00)	Howson 70'	Report		Stadium: Carrow Road; Attendance: 27,029; Referee: Mark Clattenburg

21 November 2015 13	Swansea City	2–2	AFC Bournemouth	Swansea
15:00 GMT (UTC+00:00)	Ayew 28'; Shelvey 39' (pen.)	Report	King 10'; Gosling 26'	Stadium: Liberty Stadium; Attendance: 20,878; Referee: Andre Marriner

29 November 2015 14	Liverpool	1–0	Swansea City	Liverpool
16:15 GMT (UTC+00:00)	Milner 62' (pen.)	Report		Stadium: Anfield; Attendance: 43,905; Referee: Anthony Taylor

5 December 2015 15	Swansea City	0–3	Leicester City	Swansea
15:00 GMT (UTC+00:00)		Report	Mahrez 5', 22', 67'	Stadium: Liberty Stadium; Attendance: 20,836; Referee: Michael Oliver

12 December 2015 16	Manchester City	2–1	Swansea City	Manchester
15:00 GMT (UTC+00:00)	Bony 26'; Iheanacho 90+2'	Report	Gomis 90'	Stadium: Etihad Stadium; Attendance: 53,052; Referee: Robert Madley

20 December 2015 17	Swansea City	0–0	West Ham United	Swansea
16:00 GMT (UTC+00:00)		Report		Stadium: Liberty Stadium; Attendance: 20,661; Referee: Lee Mason

26 December 2015 18	Swansea City	1–0	West Bromwich Albion	Swansea
15:00 GMT (UTC+00:00)	Ki 9'	Report		Stadium: Liberty Stadium; Attendance: 20,789; Referee: Roger East

28 December 2015 19	Crystal Palace	0–0	Swansea City	Selhurst
15:00 GMT (UTC+00:00)		Report		Stadium: Selhurst Park; Attendance: 23,714; Referee: Neil Swarbrick

2 January 2016 20	Manchester United	2–1	Swansea City	Greater Manchester
15:00 GMT (UTC+00:00)	Martial 47'; Rooney 77'	Report	Sigurðsson 70'	Stadium: Old Trafford; Attendance: 75,415; Referee: Jonathan Moss

13 January 2016 21	Swansea City	2–4	Sunderland	Swansea
19:45 GMT (UTC+00:00)	Sigurðsson 21' (pen.); Naughton (red card) 37'; Ayew 40'	Report	Defoe 3', 61', 85'; Fernández 49' (o.g.)	Stadium: Liberty Stadium; Attendance: 20,140; Referee: Graham Scott

18 January 2016 22	Swansea City	1–0	Watford	Swansea
20:00 GMT (UTC+00:00)	Williams 27'	Report		Stadium: Liberty Stadium; Attendance: 20,430; Referee: Michael Oliver

24 January 2016 23	Everton	1–2	Swansea City	Liverpool
13:30 GMT (UTC+00:00)	Cork 26' (o.g.)	Report	Sigurðsson 17' (pen.); Ayew 34'	Stadium: Goodison Park; Attendance: 36,908; Referee: Anthony Taylor

2 February 2016 24	West Bromwich Albion	1–1	Swansea City	West Bromwich
20:00 GMT (UTC+00:00)	Rondón 90+2'	Report	Sigurðsson 64'	Stadium: The Hawthorns; Attendance: 22,062; Referee: Neil Swarbrick

6 February 2016 25	Swansea City	1–1	Crystal Palace	Swansea
15:00 GMT (UTC+00:00)	Sigurðsson 13'	Report	Dann 47'	Stadium: Liberty Stadium; Attendance: 20,492; Referee: Mike Dean

13 February 2016 26	Swansea City	0–1	Southampton	Swansea
15:00 GMT (UTC+00:00)		Report	Long 69'	Stadium: Liberty Stadium; Attendance: 20,890; Referee: Jonathan Moss

28 February 2016 27	Tottenham Hotspur	2–1	Swansea City	Tottenham
14:05 GMT (UTC+00:00)	Chadli 70'; Rose 77'	Report	Paloschi 19'	Stadium: White Hart Lane; Attendance: 35,922; Referee: Mike Jones

2 March 2016 28	Arsenal	1–2	Swansea City	Holloway
19:45 GMT (UTC+00:00)	Campbell 15'	Report	Routledge 32'; Williams 74'	Stadium: Emirates Stadium; Attendance: 59,905; Referee: Robert Madley

5 March 2016 29	Swansea City	1–0	Norwich City	Swansea
15:00 GMT (UTC+00:00)	Sigurðsson 61'	Report		Stadium: Liberty Stadium; Attendance: 20,929; Referee: Craig Pawson

12 March 2016 30	AFC Bournemouth	3–2	Swansea City	Bournemouth
15:00 GMT (UTC+00:00)	Gradel 37'; King 50'; Cook 78'	Report	Barrow 39'; Sigurðsson 62'	Stadium: Dean Court; Attendance: 11,179; Referee: Roger East

19 March 2016 31	Swansea City	1–0	Aston Villa	Swansea
17:30 GMT (UTC+00:00)	Fernández 53'	Report		Stadium: Liberty Stadium; Attendance: 20,454; Referee: Mike Dean

2 April 2016 32	Stoke City	2–2	Swansea City	Stoke-on-Trent
15:00 BST (UTC+01:00)	Afellay 13'; Bojan 53'	Report	Sigurðsson 68'; Paloschi 79'	Stadium: Britannia Stadium; Attendance: 27,649; Referee: Martin Atkinson

9 April 2016 33	Swansea City	1–0	Chelsea	Swansea
15:00 BST (UTC+01:00)	Sigurðsson 25'	Report		Stadium: Liberty Stadium; Attendance: 20,966; Referee: Andre Marriner

16 April 2016 34	Newcastle United	3–0	Swansea City	Newcastle upon Tyne
15:00 BST (UTC+01:00)	Lascelles 40'; Sissoko 82'; Townsend 89'	Report		Stadium: St James' Park; Attendance: 48,949; Referee: Lee Mason

24 April 2016 35	Leicester City	4–0	Swansea City	Leicester
16:15 BST (UTC+01:00)	Mahrez 10'; Ulloa 30', 60'; Albrighton 85'	Report		Stadium: King Power Stadium; Attendance: 31,962; Referee: Mark Clattenburg

1 May 2016 36	Swansea City	3–1	Liverpool	Swansea
12:00 BST (UTC+01:00)	Ayew 20', 67'; Cork 33'	Report	Benteke 65'; Smith (yellow card) 27' (yellow-red card) 76'	Stadium: Liberty Stadium; Attendance: 20,972; Referee: Roger East

7 May 2016 37	West Ham United	1–4	Swansea City	Upton Park
15:00 BST (UTC+01:00)	Kingsley 68' (o.g.)	Report	Routledge 25'; Ayew 31'; Ki 51'; Gomis 90+3'	Stadium: Boleyn Ground; Attendance: 34,907; Referee: Michael Oliver

15 May 2016 38	Swansea City	1–1	Manchester City	Swansea
15:00 BST (UTC+01:00)	Ayew 45+1'	Report	Iheanacho 5'	Stadium: Liberty Stadium; Attendance: 20,934; Referee: Mike Dean

=== FA Cup ===
Win Draw Loss Postponed

10 January 2016 Third round	Oxford United	3–2	Swansea City	Oxford
12:00 GMT (UTC+00:00)	Sercombe 45' (pen.); Roofe 49', 59'	Report	Montero 23'; Gomis 66'	Stadium: Kassam Stadium; Attendance: 11,673; Referee: Kevin Friend

=== League Cup ===
Win Draw Loss Postponed

25 August 2015 Second round	Swansea City	3–0	York City	Swansea
19:45 BST (UTC+01:00)	Dyer 2'; Grimes 64'; Emnes 88'	Report		Stadium: Liberty Stadium; Attendance: 10,174; Referee: James Adcock

22 September 2015 Third round	Hull City	1–0	Swansea City	Kingston upon Hull
19:45 BST (UTC+01:00)	Meyler 41'	Report		Stadium: KC Stadium; Attendance: 16,286; Referee: James Linington

== Statistics ==
=== Appearances, goals and cards ===
Last updated on 15 May 2016

No.	Pos	Player	Premier League			FA Cup			League Cup			Total			Discipline	
No.	Pos	Player	Starts	Sub	Goals	Starts	Sub	Goals	Starts	Sub	Goals	Starts	Sub	Goals	Yellow card	Red card
1	GK	(Poland) Łukasz Fabiański	37	0	0	–	–	–	–	–	–	37	0	0	1	0
2	DF	(Spain) Jordi Amat	5	3	0	1	0	0	2	0	0	8	3	0	2	0
3	DF	(Wales) Neil Taylor	33	1	0	–	–	–	–	–	–	33	1	0	4	0
4	MF	(South Korea) Ki Sung-yueng	21	7	2	–	–	–	2	0	0	23	7	2	4	0
6	DF	(Wales) Ashley Williams	36	0	2	–	–	–	–	–	–	36	0	2	8	0
7	MF	(England) Leon Britton	19	6	0	–	–	–	2	0	0	21	6	0	4	0
8	MF	(Netherlands) Leroy Fer	9	2	0	–	–	–	–	–	–	9	2	0	2	0
9	FW	(Italy) Alberto Paloschi	7	3	2	–	–	–	–	–	–	7	3	2	2	0
10	FW	(Ghana) André Ayew	34	0	12	–	–	–	0	1	0	34	1	12	5	0
11	FW	(Netherlands) Marvin Emnes	1	1	0	1	0	0	0	1	1	2	2	1	0	0
13	GK	(Sweden) Kristoffer Nordfeldt	1	0	0	1	0	0	2	0	0	4	0	0	0	0
15	MF	(England) Wayne Routledge	22	6	2	–	–	–	2	0	0	24	6	2	3	0
18	FW	(France) Bafétimbi Gomis	18	15	6	1	0	1	0	1	0	19	16	7	0	0
20	MF	(Ecuador) Jefferson Montero	14	9	0	1	0	1	–	–	–	15	9	1	0	0
22	DF	(Spain) Àngel Rangel	20	3	0	–	–	–	2	0	0	22	3	0	6	0
23	MF	(Iceland) Gylfi Sigurðsson	32	4	11	–	–	–	1	0	0	33	4	11	6	0
24	MF	(England) Jack Cork	28	7	1	1	0	0	–	–	–	29	7	1	3	0
26	DF	(England) Kyle Naughton	19	8	0	–	–	–	0	1	0	19	9	0	2	1 (Note: Naughton's red card for a tackle on Sunderland's Yann M'Vila was later rescinded.)
27	DF	(England) Kyle Bartley	3	2	0	1	0	0	2	0	0	6	2	0	3	0
32	DF	(Wales) Liam Shephard	–	–	–	1	0	0	–	–	–	1	0	0	0	0
33	DF	(Argentina) Federico Fernández	32	0	1	–	–	–	–	–	–	32	0	1	3	0
35	DF	(Scotland) Stephen Kingsley	4	0	0	0	1	0	–	–	–	4	1	0	0	0
56	MF	(Scotland) Jay Fulton	0	2	0	–	–	–	–	–	–	0	2	0	0	0
58	FW	(The Gambia) Modou Barrow	6	16	1	0	1	0	–	–	–	6	17	1	0	0
Players currently away from the club on loan
12	MF	(England) Nathan Dyer	0	1	0	–	–	–	1	0	1	1	1	1	0	0
14	DF	(France) Franck Tabanou	–	–	–	1	0	0	2	0	0	3	0	0	1	0
17	FW	(Portugal) Éder	2	11	0	–	–	–	2	0	0	4	11	0	0	0
21	MF	(England) Matt Grimes	1	0	0	1	0	0	2	0	1	4	0	1	1	0
25	GK	(Germany) Gerhard Tremmel	–	–	–	–	–	–	–	–	–	–	–	–	–	–
Players who permanently left the club during the season
8	MF	(England) Jonjo Shelvey	14	2	1	1	–	–	0	2	0	15	4	1	6	0

== Overall summary ==
=== Summary ===
Games played	41 (38 Premier League, 2 League Cup, 1 FA Cup)
Games won	13 (12 Premier League, 1 League Cup, 0 FA Cup)
Games drawn	11 (11 Premier League, 0 League Cup, 0 FA Cup)
Games lost	17 (15 Premier League, 1 League Cup, 1 FA Cup)
Goals scored	47 (42 Premier League, 3 League Cup, 2 FA Cup)
Goals conceded	58 (52 Premier League, 1 League Cup, 4 FA Cup)
Goal difference	−9 (−10 Premier League, 2 League Cup, −1 FA Cup)
Clean sheets	10 (9 Premier League, 1 League Cup, 0 FA Cup
Yellow cards	66 (61 Premier League, 4 League Cup, 1 FA Cup)
Red cards	1 (Note: Naughton's red card for a tackle on Sunderland's Yann M'Vila was later rescinded.) (1 Premier League, 0 League Cup, 0 FA Cup
Worst discipline	Ashley Williams (8 (yellow card) , 0 (red card) )
Most appearances	Łukasz Fabiański (37)
Top scorer	André Ayew (12)

=== Score overview ===
Opposition	Home score	Away score	Double
Arsenal	0–3	2–1	No
Aston Villa	1–0	2–1	Yes
AFC Bournemouth	2–2	2–3	No
Chelsea	1–0	2–2	No
Crystal Palace	1–1	0–0	No
Everton	0–0	2–1	No
Leicester City	0–3	0–4	No
Liverpool	3–1	0–1	No
Manchester City	1–1	1–2	No
Manchester United	2–1	1–2	No
Newcastle United	2–0	0–3	No
Norwich City	1–0	0–1	No
Southampton	0–1	1–3	No
Stoke City	0–1	2–2	No
Sunderland	2–4	1–1	No
Tottenham Hotspur	2–2	2–1	No
Watford	1–0	0–1	No
West Bromwich Albion	1–0	1–1	No
West Ham United	0–0	4–1	No
