= 2013–14 Swansea City A.F.C. season =

Swansea City
2013–14 season
- Chairman: Huw Jenkins
- Manager: Michael Laudrup (until 4 February 2014); Garry Monk (from 4 February 2014)
- Stadium: Liberty Stadium
- Premier League: 12th
- FA Cup: Fifth round
- League Cup: Third round
- UEFA Europa League: Round of 32
- Top goalscorer: League: Wilfried Bony (16); All: Wilfried Bony (25)
- Highest home attendance: 20,769 vs. Tottenham Hotspur (19 Jan 2014, Premier League)
- Lowest home attendance: 12,500 vs. Petrolul Ploiești (22 Aug 2013, Europa League)
- Average home league attendance: 20,407 (league games only)
Home colours	Away colours

The 2013–14 season was Swansea City's 94th season in the English football league system, and their third consecutive season in the Premier League.

During pre-season Swansea recruited heavily, breaking the clubs' transfer record fee with the purchase of Ivorian striker Wilfried Bony from Vitesse Arnhem for £12 million. They also acquired Jonjo Shelvey from Liverpool for £5 million. Other significant signings included Alejandro Pozuelo and José Cañas, who both signed from Real Betis, and Spanish defender Jordi Amat from Espanyol for £2.5 million, Only two players left the club during the summer—Kemy Agustien moved to Brighton & Hove Albion on a free transfer on 1 August 2013, and Luke Moore was released by the club on 23 August 2013.

In the Premier League, Swansea lost to defending champions Manchester United 1–4 at the Liberty Stadium in their first game of the season. They picked up their first win of the league campaign on 2 September in a 0–2 away win against West Bromwich Albion. On 4 February 2014, manager Michael Laudrup was sacked by chairman Huw Jenkins following a 2–0 defeat to West Ham United. It was Swansea's sixth defeat in eight league games and left Swansea two points above the relegation zone. Garry Monk was appointed as the interim player-manager. Monk was appointed as the permanent manager of Swansea City on 7 May, signing a three-year contract. In the final game of the season Swansea beat Sunderland 1–3 at the Stadium of Light, ensuring they finished with 42 points in 12th place in the league table.

Swansea City competed in two domestic cups, the FA Cup, and the Football League Cup. Swansea entered the League Cup in the third round as the defending champions, but were knocked out of the competition in their opening match to Birmingham City, 3–1. In the FA Cup, Swansea advanced to the fifth round, but lost 3–1 to Everton at Goodison Park.

Swansea competed in the 2013–14 UEFA Europa League, their first European competition since the 1991–92 European Cup Winners' Cup. They were eliminated in the Round of 32 by Napoli, having drawn the home game 0–0 and losing the away game 3–1.

== Squad and coaching staff information ==
=== First team squad ===
Last updated on 11 May 2014. The following players were included in at least one matchday squad in the 2013–14 season.

Squad No.	Name	Nationality	Position	Date of birth (age)	Signed from	Signed in	Contract ends	Apps.	Goals	Notes
Goalkeepers
1	Michel Vorm	(Netherlands)	GK	20 October 1983 (age 43)	(Netherlands) Utrecht	2011	2016	95	0	
13	David Cornell	(Wales)	GK	28 March 1991 (age 35)	Swansea City Academy	2008	2015	1	0	
25	Gerhard Tremmel	(Germany)	GK	16 November 1978 (age 48)	Unattached	2011	2015	46	0	
42	Oliver Davies	(Wales)	GK	31 December 1994 (age 31)	Swansea City Academy	2013	2016	0	0	
45	Gregor Zabret	(Slovenia)	GK	18 August 1995 (age 31)	(Slovenia) Domžale	2013	2015	0	0	
Defenders
2	Jordi Amat	(Indonesia)	DF	21 March 1991 (age 35)	(Spain) Espanyol	2013	2017	30	0	
3	Neil Taylor	(Wales)	DF	7 February 1989 (age 37)	(Wales) Wrexham	2010	2016	96	0	
4	Chico Flores	(Spain)	DF	6 March 1987 (age 39)	(Italy) Genoa	2012	2016	75	3	(Note: Chico's goal against Fulham on 28 January 2014 was later credited as a Dimitar Berbatov own goal.)
6	Ashley Williams	(Wales)	DF	23 August 1984 (age 42)	(England) Stockport County	2008	2015	277	12	
16	Garry Monk	(England)	DF	6 March 1979 (age 47)	(England) Barnsley	2004	2015	270	7	Excluding FAW Premier Cup
19	Dwight Tiendalli	(Netherlands)	DF	21 October 1985 (age 41)	Unattached	2013	2016	40	1	
22	Àngel Rangel	(Spain)	DF	28 November 1982 (age 43)	(Spain) Terrassa	2007	2016	286	9	
27	Kyle Bartley	(England)	DF	22 May 1991 (age 35)	(England) Arsenal	2012	2015	8	0	
29	Jazz Richards	(Wales)	DF	12 April 1991 (age 35)	Swansea City Academy	2009	2016	38	0	
33	Ben Davies	(Wales)	DF	24 April 1993 (age 33)	Swansea City Academy	2011	2017	85	3	
35	Daniel Alfei	(Wales)	DF	23 February 1992 (age 34)	Swansea City Academy	2010	2016	4	0	
Midfielders
7	Leon Britton	(England)	MF	16 September 1982 (age 44)	(England) Sheffield United	2011	2016	467	17	Excluding FAW Premier Cup
8	Jonjo Shelvey	(England)	MF	27 February 1992 (age 34)	(England) Liverpool	2013	2017	42	6	
11	Pablo Hernández	(Spain)	MF	11 April 1985 (age 41)	(Spain) Valencia	2012	2015	71	5	
12	Nathan Dyer	(England)	MF	29 November 1987 (age 38)	(England) Southampton	2009	2017	232	24	
14	Roland Lamah	(Belgium)	MF	31 December 1987 (age 38)	(Spain) Osasuna	2013	2014	24	3	
15	Wayne Routledge	(England)	MF	7 January 1985 (age 41)	(England) Newcastle United	2011	2016	121	12	
17	Ki Sung-yueng	(South Korea)	MF	24 January 1989 (age 37)	(Scotland) Celtic	2012	2015	41	0	
20	Jonathan de Guzmán	(Netherlands)	MF	13 September 1987 (age 39)	(Spain) Villarreal	2012	2014	93	15	
21	José Cañas	(Spain)	MF	27 May 1987 (age 39)	(Spain) Real Betis	2013	2016	35	0	
24	Alejandro Pozuelo	(Spain)	MF	20 September 1991 (age 35)	(Spain) Real Betis	2013	2016	36	2	
31	Lee Lucas	(Wales)	MF	10 June 1992 (age 34)	Swansea City Academy	2010	2015	1	0	
53	Adam King	(Scotland)	MF	11 October 1995 (age 31)	(Scotland) Heart of Midlothian	2014	2017	0	0	
56	Jay Fulton	(Scotland)	MF	4 April 1994 (age 32)	(Scotland) Falkirk	2014	2016	2	0	
Forwards
9	Michu	(Spain)	FW	21 March 1986 (age 40)	(Spain) Rayo Vallecano	2012	2016	67	28	
10	Wilfried Bony	(Ivory Coast)	FW	10 December 1988 (age 37)	(Netherlands) Vitesse Arnhem	2013	2017	48	25	(Note: Wilfried Bony's goal against Liverpool on 23 February 2014 was later credited as a Martin Škrtel own goal.)
18	Leroy Lita	(England)	FW	28 December 1984 (age 41)	(England) Middlesbrough	2011	2014	21	2	
26	Álvaro Vázquez	(Spain)	FW	27 April 1991 (age 35)	(Spain) Getafe	2013	2014	20	0	
41	Rory Donnelly	(Northern Ireland)	FW	18 February 1992 (age 34)	(Northern Ireland) Cliftonville	2012	2015	2	0	
54	David Ngog	(France)	FW	1 April 1989 (age 37)	(England) Bolton Wanderers	2014	2014	3	0	
57	Marvin Emnes	(Netherlands)	FW	27 May 1988 (age 38)	(England) Middlesbrough	2014	2014	14	3	

=== Club staff ===
==== Backroom staff ====
Position	Name
Manager	(England) Garry Monk
Assistant manager	(Spain) Josep Clotet
First team coach	(Wales) Alan Curtis
Goalkeeping coach	(Wales) Adrian Tucker
Head physiotherapist	(Wales) Kate Rees
Physiotherapist	(Wales) Richard Buchanan
Physiotherapist	(Wales) Ailsa Jones
Masseur	(Wales) Adele Avery
Head of player recruitment	(England) David Leadbeater
Technical recruitment scout	(England) Tim Henderson
Head match analyst	(Wales) Gethin Rees
Football utilities co-ordinator	(Wales) Michael Eames
Football utilities co-ordinator	(Wales) Suzan Eames
Football in the community officer	(Wales) Linden Jones
Club doctor	(Wales) Dr. Jez McClusky

==== Board of directors ====
Position	Name
Chairman	(Wales) Huw Jenkins
Vice Chairman	(Wales) Leigh Dineen
Directors	(Wales) Huw Cooze (Wales) Gwilym Joseph MBE (South Africa) Brian Katzen (Wales) Don Keefe (Wales) Martin Morgan (Wales) Steve Penny (Netherlands) John van Zweden
Associate Directors	(Wales) David Morgan (Wales) Will Morris

== Transfers and loans ==
=== Transfer in ===
Player	Pos.	Moving from	Date	Contract	Transfer fee
(Spain) Jordi Amat	DF	(Spain) Espanyol	27 Jun 2013	4 years	£2.5m
(Spain) José Cañas	MF	(Spain) Real Betis	1 Jul 2013	3 years	Free
(Netherlands) Kenji Gorré	MF	(England) Manchester United	1 Jul 2013	1 year	Free
(Spain) Alejandro Pozuelo	MF	(Spain) Real Betis	2 Jul 2013	3 years	Undisclosed
(Slovenia) Gregor Zabret	GK	(Slovenia) Domžale	2 Jul 2013	2 years	Undisclosed
(Cyprus) Alex Gogić	MF	(Greece) Olympiacos	2 Jul 2013	1 year	Free
(England) Jonjo Shelvey	MF	(England) Liverpool	3 Jul 2013	4 years	£5m
(Ivory Coast) Wilfried Bony	FW	(Netherlands) Vitesse Arnhem	11 Jul 2013	4 years	£12m
(England) Jernade Meade	DF	(England) Arsenal	16 Jul 2013	1 year	Free
(Wales) Ryan Hedges	FW	(Wales) Flint Town United	21 Jul 2013	1 year	Free
(Netherlands) Dwight Tiendalli	DF	Unattached	28 Aug 2013	3 years	Free
(United States) Kristian Scott	MF	(England) Stoke City	4 Sep 2013	2 years	Undisclosed
(Spain) Pau Morer Vicente	MF	Unattached	10 Oct 2013	1 years	Free
(France) David Ngog	FW	(England) Bolton Wanderers	27 Jan 2014	End of season	Undisclosed
(Scotland) Adam King	MF	(Scotland) Heart of Midlothian	28 Jan 2014	3.5 years	Undisclosed
(England) Raheem Hanley	DF	Unattached	30 Jan 2014	1.5 years	Free
(Scotland) Jay Fulton	MF	(Scotland) Falkirk	31 Jan 2014	2.5 years	Undisclosed

=== Transfer out ===
Player	Pos.	Moving to	Date	Transfer fee
(Netherlands) Kemy Agustien	MF	(England) Brighton & Hove Albion	1 Aug 2013	Free
(England) Luke Moore	FW	Free agent	23 Aug 2013	Released

=== Loan in ===
Date	Player	Pos.	Loaned from	Expires	Ref.
29 Jun 2013	(Netherlands) Jonathan de Guzmán	MF	(Spain) Villarreal	30 Jun 2014	
2 Sep 2013	(Spain) Álvaro Vázquez	FW	(Spain) Getafe	30 Jun 2014	
31 Jan 2014	(Netherlands) Marvin Emnes	FW	(England) Middlesbrough	30 Jun 2014	

=== Loan out ===
Date	Player	Pos.	Loaned to	Expires	Ref.
1 Jul 2013	(Wales) Gwion Edwards	MF	(Scotland) St Johnstone	31 Dec 2013	
1 Jul 2013	(Wales) David Cornell	GK	(Scotland) St Mirren	31 Dec 2013 (Note: David Cornell's loan at St Mirren ended on 31 December 2013 due to a hamstring injury.)	
2 Jul 2013	(England) Kyle Bartley	DF	(England) Birmingham City	29 Jan 2014 (Note: Kyle Bartley was recalled by Swansea City on 29 January 2014.)	
23 Jul 2013	(England) Alan Tate	DF	(England) Yeovil Town	3 Sep 2013 (Note: Alan Tate's loan at Yeovil Town ended on 5 September 2013 due to a hamstring injury.)	
31 Aug 2013	(South Korea) Ki Sung-yueng	MF	(England) Sunderland	30 Jun 2014	
10 Sep 2013	(Wales) Jazz Richards	DF	(England) Huddersfield Town	17 Dec 2013	
16 Oct 2013	(England) Leroy Lita	FW	(England) Brighton & Hove Albion	1 Jan 2014	
2 Jan 2014	(Wales) Daniel Alfei	DF	(England) Portsmouth	30 June 2014	
3 Jan 2014	(England) Alan Tate	DF	(Scotland) Aberdeen	30 Jun 2014	
28 Jan 2014	(England) Jernade Meade	DF	(England) Luton Town	30 Jun 2014	
30 Jan 2014	(Wales) Lee Lucas	MF	(England) Cheltenham Town	28 Feb 2014	
31 Jan 2014	(Northern Ireland) Rory Donnelly	FW	(England) Coventry City	30 Jun 2014	
18 Feb 2014	(England) Curtis Obeng	DF	(England) Stevenage	30 Jun 2014	
18 Mar 2014	(Wales) James Loveridge	FW	(England) MK Dons	19 Apr 2014	
27 Mar 2014	(Wales) Gwion Edwards	MF	(England) Crawley Town	24 Apr 2014	

=== New contracts ===
No.	Pos.	Nat.	Name	Age	Status	Contract length	Expiry date	Source
12	MF	(England)	Nathan Dyer	25	Signed	4 years	June 2017	
33	DF	(Wales)	Ben Davies	20	Signed	1 year	July 2017	
42	GK	(Wales)	Oliver Davies	18	Signed	2.5 years	June 2016	
	MF	(Wales)	Corey Francis	18	Signed	1 year	June 2015	
	DF	(Wales)	Connor Roberts	18	Signed	1 year	June 2015	
	DF	(Wales)	Tom Atyeo	17	Signed	1 year	June 2015	
	DF	(Wales)	Joseph Jones	17	Signed	1 year	June 2015	
	FW	(Wales)	Alex Samuel	18	Signed	1 year	June 2015	
30	MF	(Wales)	Josh Sheehan	19	Signed	2 years	June 2016	
43	MF	(Wales)	Alex Bray	18	Signed	1 years	June 2015	
44	MF	(Wales)	Sam Evans	19	Signed	1 year	June 2015	
46	MF	(Netherlands)	Kenji Gorré	19	Signed	1 year	June 2015	
47	MF	(Cyprus)	Alex Gogić	20	Signed	1 year	June 2015	
50	FW	(Wales)	Ryan Hedges	18	Signed	1 year	June 2015	
34	MF	(Wales)	Henry Jones	20	Signed	1 year	June 2015	
36	FW	(Wales)	James Loveridge	20	Signed	1 year	June 2015	
39	MF	(Wales)	Kurtis March	21	Signed	1 year	June 2015	

== Pre-season and friendlies ==
The 2013–14 was season preceded by a ten-day tour of the Netherlands.

6 July 2013 Friendly	FC 's-Gravenzande	0–2	Swansea City	's-Gravenzande
15:00 CEST		Report	Ki 40'; Hernández 82'	Stadium: Juliana Sportpark

7 July 2013 Friendly	Excelsior Maassluis	1–5	Swansea City	Maassluis
15:00 CEST	Wever 7'	Report	Lamah 18'; Donnelly 28'; Pozuelo 70'; Gorré 75'; Dyer 87'	Stadium: Sportpark Dijkpolder

10 July 2013 Friendly	Haaglandia	0–10	Swansea City	The Hague
16:00 CEST		Report	Michu 18', 21'; Shelvey 26'; Rangel 31'; Dyer 38'; Hernández 51'; Gorré 58'; Donnelly 69', 76', 78'	Stadium: Laakkwartier

13 July 2013 Friendly	ADO Den Haag	0–1	Swansea City	The Hague
12:30 CEST		Report	Routledge 21'	Stadium: Kyocera Stadion

19 July 2013 Friendly	Yeovil Town	0–5	Swansea City	Yeovil
19:45 BST		Report	Michu 27'; Dyer 61'; Hernández 71'; Donnelly 75'; Pozuelo 89'	Stadium: Huish Park

21 July 2013 Friendly	Exeter City	0–2	Swansea City	Exeter
15:00 BST		Report	Dyer 11'; Donnelly 85'	Stadium: St James Park; Attendance: 2,265

27 July 2013 Friendly	Reading	0–3	Swansea City	Reading
15:00 BST		Report	Michu 11'; Shelvey 55'; Hernández 58'	Stadium: Madejski Stadium; Attendance: 6,810; Referee: Iain Williamson

Last updated: 28 June 2013

== Competitions ==
=== Overall ===
Competition	Started round	Current position / round	Final position / round	First match	Last match
Premier League	—	—	12th	17 August 2013	11 May 2014
League Cup	3rd round	—	3rd round	25 September 2013	25 September 2013
FA Cup	3rd round	—	5th round	5 January 2014	16 February 2014
UEFA Europa League	Third qualifying round	—	Round of 32	1 August 2013	27 February 2014

Updated to match played 11 May 2014
Source: Competitions

=== Premier League ===
==== League table ====
Pos	Team	Pld	W	D	L	GF	GA	GD	Pts
10	Newcastle United	38	15	4	19	43	59	−16	49
11	Crystal Palace	38	13	6	19	33	48	−15	45
12	Swansea City	38	11	9	18	54	54	0	42
13	West Ham United	38	11	7	20	40	51	−11	40
14	Sunderland	38	10	8	20	41	60	−19	38

Source: Barclays Premier League
Rules for classification: 1) Points; 2) Goal difference; 3) Goals scored; 4) Play-offs (only if needed to decide champion, teams for relegation or teams for UEFA competitions).

==== Results summary ====
Overall								Home						Away					
Pld	W	D	L	GF	GA	GD	Pts	W	D	L	GF	GA	GD	W	D	L	GF	GA	GD
38	11	9	18	54	54	0	42	6	5	8	33	26	+7	5	4	10	21	28	−7

Last updated: 11 May 2014.
Source: Premier League

==== Results by matchday ====
Matchday	1	2	3	4	5	6	7	8	9	10	11	12	13	14	15	16	17	18	19	20	21	22	23	24	25	26	27	28	29	30	31	32	33	34	35	36	37	38
Ground	H	A	A	H	A	H	A	H	H	A	H	A	A	H	H	A	H	A	A	H	A	H	H	A	H	A	A	H	H	A	A	H	A	H	A	H	H	A
Result	L	L	W	D	W	L	L	W	D	L	D	W	L	W	D	D	L	L	D	L	L	L	W	L	W	D	L	D	L	L	D	W	L	L	W	W	L	W
Position	20	20	16	13	9	13	15	11	9	13	13	10	13	11	10	10	11	11	11	13	13	15	10	12	10	10	12	14	14	15	15	13	15	15	13	12	13	12

Updated to match(es) played on 11 May 2014. Source: Statto.com
A = Away; H = Home; W = Win; D = Draw; L = Loss

==== Matches ====
17 August 2013 1	Swansea City	1–4	Manchester United	Swansea
17:30 BST	Cañas (yellow card) 3'; Bony 82'	Report	Valencia (yellow card) 9'; Van Persie 34', 72'; Welbeck 36', 90+2'; Carrick (yellow card) 40'; Cleverley (yellow card) 45'	Stadium: Liberty Stadium; Attendance: 20,733; Referee: Phil Dowd

25 August 2013 2	Tottenham Hotspur	1–0	Swansea City	Tottenham
16:00 BST	Soldado 58' (pen.) (yellow card) 76'	Report	Davies (yellow card) 16'; Vorm (yellow card) 30'; Michu (yellow card) 40'; Williams (yellow card) 73'	Stadium: White Hart Lane; Attendance: 36,005; Referee: Neil Swarbrick

1 September 2013 3	West Bromwich Albion	0–2	Swansea City	West Bromwich
13:30 BST	McAuley (yellow card) 29'; Yacob (yellow card) 38'; Dorrans (yellow card) 54'; Olsson (yellow card) 65'	Report	Davies 22'; Michu (yellow card) 61'; Rangel (yellow card) 70'; Pozuelo (yellow card) 76'; Hernández 83'	Stadium: The Hawthorns; Attendance: 23,395; Referee: Mike Dean

16 September 2013 4	Swansea City	2–2	Liverpool	Swansea
20:00 BST	Shelvey 2' (yellow card) 56'; Williams (yellow card) 50'; Michu 64'	Report	Sturridge 4'; Moses 36'; Lucas (yellow card) 56'; Henderson (yellow card) 61'; Wisdom (yellow card) 66'	Stadium: Liberty Stadium; Attendance: 20,752; Referee: Michael Oliver

22 September 2013 5	Crystal Palace	0–2	Swansea City	Selhurst
13:30 BST	Moxey (yellow card) 28'; Chamakh (yellow card) 51'	Report	Michu 2'; Dyer 48'; Rangel (yellow card) 50'; De Guzmán (yellow card) 80'; Flores (yellow card) 84'	Stadium: Selhurst Park; Attendance: 22,466; Referee: Kevin Friend

28 September 2013 6	Swansea City	1–2	Arsenal	Swansea
17:30 BST	Davies 82'; Flores (yellow card) 84'; Cañas (yellow card) 84'	Report	Gnabry 58'; Ramsey 62'; Flamini (yellow card) 60'; Arteta (yellow card) 90+3'	Stadium: Liberty Stadium; Attendance: 20,712; Referee: Mark Clattenburg

6 October 2013 7	Southampton	2–0	Swansea City	Southampton
13:30 BST	Lallana 19'; Lovren (yellow card) 54'; Fonte (yellow card) 54'; Wanyama (yellow card) 81'; Rodriguez 83'	Report	Cañas (yellow card) 49'	Stadium: St Mary's Stadium; Attendance: 28,570; Referee: Mike Dean

19 October 2013 8	Swansea City	4–0	Sunderland	Swansea
15:00 BST	Flores (yellow card) 45+2'; Bardsley 57' (o.g.); De Guzmán 58'; Bony 64' (pen.); Fletcher 80' (o.g.)	Report	Bardsley (yellow card) 10'; Roberge (yellow card) 43'	Stadium: Liberty Stadium; Attendance: 20,245; Referee: Craig Pawson

27 October 2013 9	Swansea City	0–0	West Ham United	Swansea
16:00 BST	Rangel (yellow card) 65'	Report	Dumel (yellow card) 24'; Morrison (yellow card) 43'; Cole (yellow card) 87'	Stadium: Liberty Stadium; Attendance: 20,455; Referee: Phil Dowd

3 November 2013 10	Cardiff City	1–0	Swansea City	Cardiff
16:00 GMT	Caulker 62'; Whittingham (yellow card) 87'	Report	Vorm (red card) 90+1'; Taylor (yellow card) 90+1'	Stadium: Cardiff City Stadium; Attendance: 27,463; Referee: Mike Dean

10 November 2013 11	Swansea City	3–3	Stoke City	Swansea
16:10 GMT	Flores (yellow card) 34'; Bony 56', 86'; Williams (yellow card) 60'; Dyer 74' (yellow card) 87'; Rangel (yellow card) 81'; Routledge (yellow card) 90+2'	Report	Walters 8'; Ireland 25'; Huth (yellow card) 36'; Begović (yellow card) 90+2'; Adam (yellow card) 80' (goal) 90+6' (pen.)	Stadium: Liberty Stadium; Attendance: 19,242; Referee: Robert Madley

23 November 2013 12	Fulham	1–2	Swansea City	Fulham
15:00 GMT	Boateng (yellow card) 19'; Kasami (yellow card) 30'; Hughes (yellow card) 62'; Parker 64'	Report	Hughes 56' (o.g.); Davies (yellow card) 72'; Shelvey 80'	Stadium: Craven Cottage; Attendance: 25,258; Referee: Andre Marriner

1 December 2013 13	Manchester City	3–0	Swansea City	Manchester
16:10 GMT	Negredo 8'; Agüero (yellow card) 48'; Nasri 58', 77'	Report		Stadium: Etihad Stadium; Attendance: 46,559; Referee: Mark Clattenburg

4 December 2013 14	Swansea City	3–0	Newcastle United	Swansea
19:45 GMT	Dyer 45+1'; Debuchy 66' (o.g.); Shelvey 81'	Report	Debuchy (yellow card) 58'; Haïdara (yellow card) 86'	Stadium: Liberty Stadium; Attendance: 20,457; Referee: Howard Webb

9 December 2013 15	Swansea City	1–1	Hull City	Swansea
20:00 GMT	Flores 60' (yellow card) 83'; Williams (yellow card) 80'; Shelvey (yellow card) 80'	Report	Graham 9'; Livermore (yellow card) 41'; Figueroa (yellow card) 78'; Sagbo (yellow card) 80'	Stadium: Liberty Stadium; Attendance: 19,303; Referee: Martin Atkinson

15 December 2013 16	Norwich City	1–1	Swansea City	Norwich
13:30 GMT	Hooper 45+4'	Report	Dyer 12'; Cañas (yellow card) 55'; Vorm (yellow card) 62'; Rangel (yellow card) 64'	Stadium: Carrow Road; Attendance: 28,876; Referee: Michael Oliver

22 December 2013 17	Swansea City	1–2	Everton	Swansea
16:00 GMT	Oviedo 70' (o.g.); Davies (yellow card) 83'	Report	Coleman 66'; Barkley 84'	Stadium: Liberty Stadium; Attendance: 20,695; Referee: Lee Mason

26 December 2013 18	Chelsea	1–0	Swansea City	London
15:00 GMT	Hazard 29'; Ramires (yellow card) 86'	Report	Amat (yellow card) 86'	Stadium: Stamford Bridge; Attendance: 41,111; Referee: Mike Jones

28 December 2013 19	Aston Villa	1–1	Swansea City	Birmingham
15:00 GMT	Agbonlahor 7'; Bacuna (yellow card) 69'; Clark (yellow card) 86'; El Ahmadi (yellow card) 90'	Report	Lamah 36', (yellow card) 37'; Rangel (yellow card) 77'	Stadium: Villa Park; Attendance: 37,028; Referee: Roger East

1 January 2014 20	Swansea City	2–3	Manchester City	Swansea
15:00 GMT	Cañas (yellow card) 37'; Bony 45+2', 90+1'; Shelvey (yellow card) 45+3'	Report	Fernandinho 14'; Nasri (yellow card) 26'; Džeko (yellow card) 37'; Kompany (yellow card) 54'; Touré 58'; Kolarov 66'; Zabaleta (yellow card) 86'; Milner (yellow card) 90+3'	Stadium: Liberty Stadium; Attendance: 20,498; Referee: Phil Dowd

11 January 2014 21	Manchester United	2–0	Swansea City	Manchester
17:30 GMT	Valencia 47'; Welbeck 59'	Report	Rangel (yellow card) 37'; Bony (yellow card) 45+2'	Stadium: Old Trafford; Attendance: 70,035; Referee: Chris Foy

19 January 2014 22	Swansea City	1–3	Tottenham Hotspur	Swansea
13:30 GMT	Amat (yellow card) 49'; Bony (yellow card) 68', (goal) 78'	Report	Adebayor 35', 71'; Flores 53' (o.g.); Rose (yellow card) 80'	Stadium: Liberty Stadium; Attendance: 20,769; Referee: Martin Atkinson

28 January 2014 23	Swansea City	2–0	Fulham	Swansea
19:45 GMT	Shelvey 61'; Berbatov 75' (o.g.); Bony (yellow card) 90+1'	Report	Richardson (yellow card) 75'	Stadium: Liberty Stadium; Attendance: 20,004; Referee: Michael Oliver

1 February 2014 24	West Ham United	2–0	Swansea City	London
GMT	Nolan 26', 45', (yellow card) 33'; Carroll (red card) 59'	Report		Stadium: Boleyn Ground; Attendance: 31,848; Referee: Howard Webb

8 February 2014 25	Swansea City	3–0	Cardiff City	Swansea
17:30 GMT	Routledge 47'; Hernández (yellow card) 78'; Dyer 79'; Bony 85'	Report	Mutch (yellow card) 86'	Stadium: Liberty Stadium; Attendance: 20,402; Referee: Andre Marriner

12 February 2014 26	Stoke City	1–1	Swansea City	Stoke-on-Trent
20:00 GMT	Crouch 17' (yellow card) 88'; Adam (yellow card) 36'	Report	Williams (yellow card) 36'; Flores 52'; Britton (yellow card) 71'	Stadium: Britannia Stadium; Attendance: 24,822; Referee: Jonathan Moss

23 February 2014 27	Liverpool	4–3	Swansea City	Liverpool
13:30 GMT	Sturridge 3', 36'; Henderson 20', 74'; Škrtel (yellow card) 26'	Report	Shelvey 23'; Škrtel 27' (o.g.); Bony 47' (pen.)	Stadium: Anfield; Attendance: 44,731; Referee: Mike Jones

2 March 2014 28	Swansea City	1–1	Crystal Palace	Swansea
16:00 GMT	De Guzmán 25'; Britton (yellow card) 74'; Flores (red card) 81'	Report	Jedinak (yellow card) 35'; Jerome (yellow card) 48'; Dann (yellow card) 63'; Murray 82' (pen.); Thomas (yellow card) 90+2'	Stadium: Liberty Stadium; Attendance: 20,240; Referee: Mike Dean

15 March 2014 29	Swansea City	1–2	West Bromwich Albion	Swansea
15:00 GMT	Lamah 2'; Routledge (yellow card) 29'	Report	Anichebe (yellow card) 26'; Reid (yellow card) 42'; Sessègnon 52'; Olsson (yellow card) 53'; Mulumbu 85'	Stadium: Liberty Stadium; Attendance: 20,703; Referee: Martin Atkinson

22 March 2014 30	Everton	3–2	Swansea City	Liverpool
15:00 GMT	Baines 20' (pen.); Lukaku 53'; Barkley 58'	Report	Bony 33'; Williams 90+2'	Stadium: Goodison Park; Attendance: 36,260; Referee: Michael Oliver

25 March 2014 31	Arsenal	2–2	Swansea City	Holloway
15:00 GMT	Podolski 73'; Giroud 74'	Report	Bony 11' (yellow card) 34'; Flamini 90' (o.g.)	Stadium: Emirates Stadium; Attendance: 59,937; Referee: Lee Probert

29 March 2014 32	Swansea City	3–0	Norwich City	Swansea
15:00 GMT	De Guzmán 30', 38'; Routledge 75'; Rangel (yellow card) 62'	Report	Johnson (yellow card) 57'; Tettey (yellow card) 59'	Stadium: Liberty Stadium; Attendance: 20,371; Referee: Jonathan Moss

5 April 2014 33	Hull City	1–0	Swansea City	Kingston upon Hull
15:00 BST	Boyd 39'	Report	Shelvey (yellow card) 41'; Hernández (yellow card) 74'	Stadium: KC Stadium; Attendance: 22,744; Referee: Howard Webb

13 April 2014 34	Swansea City	0–1	Chelsea	Swansea
16:07 BST	Flores (yellow card) 14' (yellow-red card) 16'	Report	Schürrle (yellow card) 45'; Ba 68'; Mikel (yellow card) 86'	Stadium: Liberty Stadium; Attendance: 20,761; Referee: Phil Dowd

19 April 2014 35	Newcastle United	1–2	Swansea City	Newcastle upon Tyne
15:00 BST	Ameobi 23'; Gosling (yellow card) 32'; Tioté (yellow card) 90+1'	Report	Bony 45+1', 90+2' (pen.)	Stadium: St James' Park; Attendance: 51,057; Referee: Chris Foy

26 April 2014 36	Swansea City	4–1	Aston Villa	Swansea
15:00 BST	Bony 10', 90+4' (pen.); Shelvey 26'; Hernández 73'; Amat (yellow card) 77'	Report	Agbonlahor 22'; Albrighton (yellow card) 89'; Baker (yellow card) 90+2'; Westwood (yellow card) 90+3'	Stadium: Liberty Stadium; Attendance: 20,701; Referee: Mark Clattenburg

3 May 2014 37	Swansea City	0–1	Southampton	Swansea
15:00 BST	Emnes (yellow card) 82'	Report	Fonte (yellow card) 59'; Lambert 90+3'	Stadium: Liberty Stadium; Attendance: 20,682; Referee: Anthony Taylor

11 May 2014 38	Sunderland	1–3	Swansea City	Sunderland
15:00 BST	Borini 50', (yellow card) 83'; Bridcutt (yellow card) 85'	Report	Dyer 7'; Emnes 14' (yellow card) 55'; Fulton (yellow card) 20'; Bony 54'; Amat (yellow card) 69'	Stadium: Stadium of Light; Attendance: 45,580; Referee: Chris Foy

Source: Swansea City A.F.C.

=== UEFA Europa League ===
==== Third qualifying round ====
1 August 2013 First leg	Swansea City (England)	4–0	(Sweden) Malmö FF	Swansea
19:45 BST	Michu 37'; Amat (yellow card) 47'; Bony 55', 59'; Pozuelo 86'	Report	Eriksson (yellow card) 57'; Ricardinho (yellow card) 57'; Friberg (yellow card) 65'	Stadium: Liberty Stadium; Attendance: 16,176; Referee: Paolo Silvio Mazzoleni

8 August 2013 Second leg	Malmö FF (Sweden)	0–0 (0–4 agg.)	(England) Swansea City	Malmö, Sweden
18:45 BST	Rakip (yellow card) 35'; Friberg (yellow card) 44'; Alboronoz (yellow card) 53'	Report	Michu (yellow card) 34'; Williams (yellow card) 62'	Stadium: Swedbank Stadion; Attendance: 11,528; Referee: Serdar Gözübüyük

==== Play-off round ====
22 August 2013 First leg	Swansea City (England)	5–1	(Romania) Petrolul Ploiești	Swansea
19:05 BST	Routledge 14', 25'; Michu 22'; Bony 59'; Pozuelo 70'	Report	Geraldo (yellow card) 69'; Grozav 87'	Stadium: Liberty Stadium; Attendance: 12,500; Referee: Sergei Karasev

29 August 2013 Second leg	Petrolul Ploiești (Romania)	2–1 (3–6 agg.)	(England) Swansea City	Ploiești, Romania
18:30 BST	Mustivar (yellow card) 12'; Priso (yellow card) 14', (goal) 73'; Younés 83'	Report	Amat (yellow card) 45+1'; Tremmel (yellow card) 54'; Lamah 74'; Pozuelo (yellow card) 84'; Flores (yellow card) 87'; Britton (red card) 87'	Stadium: Stadionul Ilie Oană; Attendance: 15,000; Referee: Michael Koukoulakis

==== Group stage ====
Pos	Team	Pld	W	D	L	GF	GA	GD	Pts	Qualification
1	(Spain) Valencia	6	4	1	1	12	7	+5	13	Advance to knockout phase
2	(England) Swansea City	6	2	2	2	6	4	+2	8	Advance to knockout phase
3	(Russia) Kuban Krasnodar	6	1	3	2	7	7	0	6 (Note: Tied on head-to-head points (3). Head-to-head goal difference: Kuban Krasnodar +2, St. Gallen −2.)	
4	(Switzerland) St. Gallen	6	2	0	4	6	13	−7	6	

Source: Soccerway
Notes:

19 September 2013 1	Valencia (Spain)	0–3	(England) Swansea City	Valencia, Spain
18:00 BST	Rami (red card) 10'; Fuego (yellow card) 45+1'; Banega (yellow card) 77'	Report	Rangel (yellow card) 14'; Bony 14'; Michu 58'; De Guzmán 62'	Stadium: Mestalla Stadium; Attendance: 32,000; Referee: Serge Gumienny

3 October 2013 2	Swansea City (England)	1–0	(Switzerland) St. Gallen	Swansea
20:05 BST	Routledge 52'; Davies (yellow card) 77'; Dyer (yellow card) 78'	Report	Martić (yellow card) 78'	Stadium: Liberty Stadium; Attendance: 15,397; Referee: Duarte Gomes

24 October 2013 3	Swansea City (England)	1–1	(Russia) Kuban Krasnodar	Swansea
20:05 BST	Tiendalli (yellow card) 36'; Michu 68'; Tremmel (yellow card) 90+2'	Report	Armaș (yellow card) 41'; Cissé 90+3' (pen.)	Stadium: Liberty Stadium; Attendance: 14,964; Referee: Kristinn Jakobsson

7 November 2013 4	Kuban Krasnodar (Russia)	1–1	(England) Swansea City	Krasnodar, Russia
17:00 GMT	Xandão (yellow card) 75' (red card); Baldé 90+2'; Dealbert (yellow card) 90+4'	Report	Bony 9'; Tiendalli (yellow card) 56'	Stadium: Kuban Stadium; Referee: Robert Schörgenhofer

28 November 2013 5	Swansea City (England)	0–1	(Spain) Valencia	Swansea
20:05 GMT	Rangel (yellow card) 5'; Vázquez (yellow card) 45'; Shelvey (yellow card) 86'	Report	Parejo 20', (yellow card) 70'; Guardado (yellow card) 52'; Jonas (yellow card) 60'	Stadium: Liberty Stadium; Attendance: 17,896; Referee: Luca Banti

12 December 2013 6	St. Gallen (Switzerland)	1–0	(England) Swansea City	St. Gallen, Switzerland
18:00 GMT	Mathys 80'; Lenjani (yellow card) 81'	Report	Cañas (yellow card) 90'	Stadium: AFG Arena; Attendance: 15,298; Referee: Liran Liany

==== Knockout phase ====
===== Round of 32 =====
20 February 2014 First leg	Swansea City (England)	0–0	(Italy) Napoli	Swansea
20:05 GMT	Hernández (yellow card) 56'; De Guzmán (yellow card) 84'	Report	Insigne (yellow card) 59'; Maggio (yellow card) 71'; Hamšík (yellow card) 72'	Stadium: Liberty Stadium; Attendance: 19,567; Referee: Ivan Bebek

27 February 2014 Second leg	Napoli (Italy)	3–1 (3–1 agg.)	(England) Swansea City	Naples, Italy
18:00 GMT	Insigne 17'; Higuaín 78'; Inler (yellow card) 84' (goal) 90+3'	Report	De Guzmán 30'; Cañas (yellow card) 47'; Flores (yellow card) 54'; Taylor (yellow card) 91'	Stadium: Stadio San Paolo; Attendance: 25,235; Referee: Ovidiu Hațegan

Source: Swansea City A.F.C.

=== FA Cup ===
5 January 2014 Third round	Manchester United	1–2	Swansea City	Manchester
16:30 GMT	Hernández 16'; Fábio (red card) 80'	Report	Routledge 12'; Amat (yellow card) 41'; Flores (yellow card) 82'; Tiendalli (yellow card) 83'; Bony 90'	Stadium: Old Trafford; Attendance: 73,190; Referee: Mike Dean

25 January 2014 Fourth round	Birmingham City	1–2	Swansea City	Birmingham
15:00 GMT	Novak 16'; Lee (yellow card) 31'; Robinson (yellow card) 37'	Report	Bony 67', 69'	Stadium: St Andrew's; Attendance: 11,490; Referee: Neil Swarbrick

16 February 2014 Fifth round	Everton	3–1	Swansea City	Liverpool
13:30 GMT	Traoré 4'; Naismith 65'; Baines 72' (pen.)	Report	De Guzmán 15'; Amat (yellow card) 82'; Lita (yellow card) 87'; Cañas (yellow card) 87'	Stadium: Goodison Park; Attendance: 31,498; Referee: Kevin Friend

Source: Swansea City A.F.C.

=== League Cup ===
25 September 2013 Third round	Birmingham City	3–1	Swansea City	Birmingham
19:45 BST	Burn 57'; Doyle (yellow card) 59'; Green 61'; Adeyemi 81'	Report	Britton (yellow card) 45+1'; Taylor (yellow card) 88'; Bony 90+5'	Stadium: St Andrew's; Attendance: 7,470; Referee: Keith Stroud

Source: Swansea City A.F.C.

== Statistics ==
=== Appearances and goals ===
Last updated on 11 May 2014
Players with no appearances are not included in the list.

No.	Pos	Player	Premier League		FA Cup		League Cup		Europa League		Total	
No.	Pos	Player	App.	Goals	App.	Goals	App.	Goals	App.	Goals	App.	Goals
1	GK	(Netherlands) Michel Vorm	26	0	–	–	–	–	6	0	32	0
2	DF	(Spain) Jordi Amat	12+4	0	3	0	1	0	8+1	0	24+5	0
3	DF	(Wales) Neil Taylor	6+4	0	3	0	1	0	5+1	0	15+5	0
4	DF	(Spain) Chico Flores	30+1	2	2	0	–	–	10	0	42+1	2
6	DF	(Wales) Ashley Williams	34	1	1+1	0	–	–	6+1	0	41+2	1
7	MF	(England) Leon Britton	23+2	0	2	0	1	0	6	0	32+2	0
8	MF	(England) Jonjo Shelvey	29+3	6	1	0	1	0	5+3	0	36+6	6
9	MF	(Spain) Michu	15+2	2	–	–	–	–	7	4	22+2	6
10	FW	(Ivory Coast) Wilfried Bony	28+7	16	1+1	3	1	1	11	5	40+8	25
11	MF	(Spain) Pablo Hernández	17+10	2	2	0	–	–	4+2	0	23+12	2
12	MF	(England) Nathan Dyer	19+8	6	0+1	–	–	–	6+3	0	25+12	6
14	MF	(Belgium) Roland Lamah	4+5	2	2	0	1	0	3+3	1	10+8	3
15	MF	(England) Wayne Routledge	32+3	2	2+1	1	0+1	0	7+1	3	41+6	6
18	FW	(England) Leroy Lita	0+2	–	0+1	0	–	–	–	–	0+3	0
19	DF	(Netherlands) Dwight Tiendalli	9+1	0	2	0	1	0	6	0	18+1	0
20	MF	(Netherlands) Jonathan de Guzmán	26+8	4	2	1	1	0	7+4	2	36+12	7
21	MF	(Spain) José Cañas	19+4	0	1+1	0	0+1	0	6+3	0	26+9	0
22	DF	(Spain) Àngel Rangel	29+1	0	–	–	–	–	6+3	0	35+4	0
24	MF	(Spain) Alejandro Pozuelo	7+15	0	2	0	1	0	8+3	2	18+18	2
25	GK	(Germany) Gerhard Tremmel	11	0	3	0	1	0	6	0	21	0
26	FW	(Spain) Álvaro Vázquez	5+7	0	2+1	0	0+1	0	0+4	0	7+13	0
27	DF	(England) Kyle Bartley	1+1	0	1	0	–	–	–	–	2+1	0
29	DF	(Wales) Jazz Richards	–	–	1	0	–	–	1	0	2	0
33	DF	(Wales) Ben Davies	32+2	2	–	–	–	–	6+1	0	38+3	2
54	FW	(France) David Ngog	0+3	0	–	–	–	–	–	–	0+3	0
56	MF	(Scotland) Jay Fulton	1+1	0	–	–	–	–	–	–	1+1	0
57	FW	(Netherlands) Marvin Emnes	2+5	1	–	–	–	–	1+1	0	3+6	1
Players away from the club on loan:
17	MF	(South Korea) Ki Sung-yueng	0+1	0	–	–	–	–	0+2	0	0+3	0
41	FW	(Northern Ireland) Rory Donnelly	–	–	–	–	–	–	1	0	1	0
Players who retired during the season:
16	DF	(England) Garry Monk (Note: Garry Monk retired as a player when he was appointed as the permanent Swansea City manager on 7 May 2014.)	–	–	–	–	1	0	–	–	1	0

=== Clean sheets ===
This includes all competitive matches. The list is sorted by shirt number when total clean sheets are equal.

Last updated on 13 April 2014

Rank	Pos.	No.	Name	Premier League	FA Cup	League Cup	Europa League	Total
1	GK	1	(Netherlands) Michel Vorm	7	0	0	3	10
2	GK	25	(Germany) Gerhard Tremmel	1	0	0	2	3
TOTALS				8	0	0	5	13

=== Disciplinary record ===
This includes all competitive matches. The list is sorted by shirt number when total cards are equal. The list for the Europa League is sorted into Tournament Phase and Qualifying Phase since all yellow cards and pending yellow-card suspensions expire on completion of the Qualifying Phase play-offs.

Last updated on 11 May 2014

Rank	Pos.	No.	Player	Premier League		FA Cup		League Cup		Europa League Tournament Phase		Europa League Qualifying Phase		Total	
Rank	Pos.	No.	Player	Yellow card	Red card	Yellow card	Red card	Yellow card	Red card	Yellow card	Red card	Yellow card	Red card	Yellow card	Red card
1	DF	4	(Spain) Chico Flores	6	2	1	0	0	0	2	0	0	0	9	2
2	MF	7	(England) Leon Britton	2	0	0	0	1	0	0	0	0	1	3	1
3	GK	1	(Netherlands) Michel Vorm	2	1	0	0	0	0	0	0	0	0	2	1
4	DF	22	(Spain) Àngel Rangel	8	0	0	0	0	0	2	0	0	0	10	0
5	MF	21	(Spain) José Cañas	5	0	1	0	0	0	1	0	1	0	8	0
6	DF	2	(Spain) Jordi Amat	3	0	2	0	0	0	0	0	2	0	7	0
7	DF	6	(Wales) Ashley Williams	5	0	0	0	0	0	0	0	1	0	6	0
8	MF	8	(England) Jonjo Shelvey	4	0	0	0	0	0	1	0	0	0	5	0
9	FW	10	(Ivory Coast) Wilfried Bony	4	0	0	0	0	0	0	0	0	0	4	0
9	DF	33	(Wales) Ben Davies	3	0	0	0	0	0	1	0	0	0	4	0
11	DF	3	(Wales) Neil Taylor	1	0	0	0	1	0	1	0	0	0	3	0
11	MF	9	(Spain) Michu	2	0	0	0	0	0	0	0	1	0	3	0
11	DF	19	(Netherlands) Dwight Tiendalli	0	0	1	0	0	0	2	0	0	0	3	0
11	MF	11	(Spain) Pablo Hernández	2	0	0	0	0	0	1	0	0	0	3	0
15	MF	12	(England) Nathan Dyer	1	0	0	0	0	0	1	0	0	0	2	0
15	MF	15	(England) Wayne Routledge	2	0	0	0	0	0	0	0	0	0	2	0
15	MF	20	(Netherlands) Jonathan de Guzmán	1	0	0	0	0	0	1	0	0	0	2	0
15	MF	24	(Spain) Alejandro Pozuelo	1	0	0	0	0	0	0	0	1	0	2	0
15	GK	25	(Germany) Gerhard Tremmel	0	0	0	0	0	0	1	0	1	0	2	0
15	FW	57	(Netherlands) Marvin Emnes	2	0	0	0	0	0	0	0	0	0	2	0
21	MF	14	(Belgium) Roland Lamah	1	0	0	0	0	0	0	0	0	0	1	0
21	FW	18	(England) Leroy Lita	0	0	1	0	0	0	0	0	0	0	1	0
21	FW	26	(Spain) Álvaro Vázquez	0	0	0	0	0	0	1	0	0	0	1	0
21	MF	56	(Scotland) Jay Fulton	1	0	0	0	0	0	0	0	0	0	1	0
TOTALS				56	3	6	0	2	0	15	0	7	1	86	4

== Overall summary ==
=== Summary ===
Last updated on 11 May 2014

Games played	54 (38 Premier League, 3 FA Cup, 1 League Cup, 12 Europa League)
Games won	17 (11 Premier League, 2 FA Cup, 4 Europa League)
Games drawn	13 (9 Premier League, 4 Europa League)
Games lost	24 (18 Premier League, 1 FA Cup, 1 League Cup, 4 Europa League)
Goals scored	77 (54 Premier League, 5 FA Cup, 1 League Cup, 17 Europa League)
Goals conceded	72 (54 Premier League, 5 FA Cup, 3 League Cup, 10 Europa League)
Goal difference	+5
Clean sheets	13 (8 Premier League, 5 Europa League)
Yellow cards	86 (56 Premier League, 6 FA Cup, 2 League Cup, 22 Europa League)
Red cards	4 (3 Premier League, 1 Europa League)
Worst discipline	Chico Flores (9 (yellow card) , 2 (red card) )
Best result	5–1 vs Petrolul Ploiești (H), 4–0 vs Sunderland (H)
Worst result	1–4 vs Manchester United (H)
Most appearances	Wilfried Bony & Jonathan de Guzmán (48 appearances)
Top scorer	Wilfried Bony (25 goals)

=== Score overview ===
Opposition	Home score	Away score	Double
Arsenal	1–2	2–2	No
Aston Villa	4–1	1–1	No
Cardiff City	3–0	0–1	No
Chelsea	0–1	0–1	No
Crystal Palace	1–1	2–0	No
Everton	1–2	3–2	No
Fulham	2–0	2–1	Yes
Hull City	1–1	0–1	No
Liverpool	2–2	3–4	No
Manchester City	2–3	0–3	No
Manchester United	1–4	0–2	No
Newcastle United	3–0	2–1	Yes
Norwich City	3–0	1–1	No
Southampton	0–1	0–2	No
Stoke City	3–3	1–1	No
Sunderland	4–0	3–1	Yes
Tottenham Hotspur	1–3	0–1	No
West Bromwich Albion	1–2	2–0	No
West Ham United	0–0	0–2	No
