= David Cornell =

Welsh footballer

Personal information
- Full name: David Joseph Cornell
- Date of birth: 28 March 1991 (age 35)
- Place of birth: Waunarlwydd, Wales
- Height: 1.80 m (5 ft 11 in)
- Position: Goalkeeper

Team information
- Current team: Leicester City
- Number: 13

Youth career
- 2007–2009: Swansea City

Senior career*
Years	Team	Apps	(Gls)
2009–2015	Swansea City	0	(0)
2011	→ Port Talbot Town (loan)	14	(0)
2011–2012	→ Hereford United (loan)	24	(0)
2013	→ St Mirren (loan)	5	(0)
2015	→ Portsmouth (loan)	0	(0)
2015–2016	Oldham Athletic	14	(0)
2016–2020	Northampton Town	92	(0)
2020–2021	Ipswich Town	10	(0)
2021–2022	Peterborough United	30	(0)
2022–2026	Preston North End	18	(0)
2026–	Leicester City	0	(0)

International career
2007	Wales U17	5	(0)
2009–2010	Wales U19	2	(0)
2010–2012	Wales U21	3	(0)
- * Club domestic league appearances and goals as of 9 April 2025 (UTC)

David Joseph "Dai" Cornell (born 28 March 1991) is a Welsh professional footballer who plays as a goalkeeper for EFL League One club Leicester City. He is a former Wales under-21 international.

== Club career ==
=== Swansea City ===
After progressing through Swansea City's Academy, Cornell was included in Swansea's senior squad for their 2008 pre-season tour of Spain. However the 17-year old's progress was halted when he suffered a serious wrist injury on tour. Later that season, Cornell was called up to the first team bench for Swansea's fifth round FA Cup match against Fulham after loan signing Dimitrios Konstantopoulos was unable to extend his stay at the club. Ten days later, Cornell was included again on Swansea's bench for the# FA Cup fifth round replay against Fulham. After impressing manager Roberto Martínez, Cornell was installed as Dorus de Vries' understudy for the rest of the 2008–09 season but made no further appearances in Swansea's remaining matchday squads.

Cornell made his professional debut for Swansea on 25 August 2009 when he was named in the starting line-up for the League Cup match against Scunthorpe United. In February 2010, Cornell signed a new three-and-a-half-year contract with Swansea to keep him at the club until July 2013. In the 2009–10 season, Cornell was included on the bench for 45 of Swansea's 46 Football League Championship games.

Following loan spells at Port Talbot Town and Hereford United, Cornell returned to Swansea for the 2012–13 season as third choice goalkeeper. In September 2012, Cornell signed a new three-year deal, keeping him at the club until July 2015. Due to injuries to Michel Vorm and Gerhard Tremmel, Cornell was included on the bench on 14 occasions for Swansea during the season.

On 28 May 2015, Swansea City confirmed that Cornell had been released from the club.

==== Port Talbot Town (loan) ====
In the 2010–11 season, Cornell fell down the pecking order at Swansea following the signing of Yves Ma-Kalambay as cover for Dorus de Vries and was loaned out to Welsh Premier League side Port Talbot Town during the second half of the season to gain first team experience. Cornell made 14 appearances for Port Talbot, keeping 5 clean sheets.

==== Hereford United (loan) ====
After Swansea's promotion to the Premier League, Cornell's opportunities were further limited. In August 2011 Football League Two side Hereford United signed Cornell on an initial one-month loan deal as cover for Adam Bartlett. After some impressive performances, Cornell's loan was extended by Hereford until the end of the 2011–12 season. Cornell made 27 appearances in all competitions for Hereford.

==== St Mirren (loan) ====
On 1 July 2013, Cornell joined St Mirren on a season-long loan. Cornell made 6 appearances in all competitions for St Mirren before his loan was cancelled in December 2013.

==== Portsmouth (loan) ====
On 17 March 2015, Cornell joined Portsmouth on a one-month loan deal. He did not make an appearance for the club before returning to Swansea in April.

=== Oldham Athletic ===
Following his release from Swansea City, Cornell joined League One team Oldham Athletic in July 2015 on a one-year contract with the option of an additional year extension. He made his debut against Middlesbrough in the League Cup on 12 August 2015. Cornell made 17 appearances for Oldham during the 2015–16 season.

=== Northampton Town ===
In June 2016, Cornell joined Northampton Town on a two-year contract. He made his debut for Northampton on 30 August 2016 against Wycombe Wanderers in the EFL Trophy. He featured as the second choice keeper during his first season at the club, behind first choice goalkeeper Adam Smith, making 10 appearances in all competitions with 6 of those being in the league.

He continued as second choice keeper for Northampton during the following season, making 12 appearances during the season as Northampton suffered relegation from League One. He was offered a new contract by Northampton at the end of the 2017–18 season, following their relegation.

Cornell became the first choice keeper at Northampton during the 2018–19 season. He started every league game for Northampton, making 48 appearances in total in all competitions.

He kept his place as the starting goalkeeper in the first-team the following season. He made 33 starts and 1 substitute appearance in the league, helping Northampton to a 7th-placed finish in League Two and qualification for the League Two play-offs as a result. Northampton won promotion to League One after defeating Exeter City 4–0 in the 2020 EFL League One play-off final at Wembley Stadium. He was an unused substitute during the final. He made 38 appearances in total during the 2019–20 season. Cornell was released at the end of the 2019–2020 season after not receiving a new contract offer from the club.

=== Ipswich Town ===
On 17 August 2020, Cornell joined Ipswich Town on a free transfer, signing a two-year contract with the option of an additional year extension. He started his Ipswich career as second-choice keeper behind Tomáš Holý, appearing in cup competitions during the early months of the 2020–21 season, he played in all of Ipswich's EFL Trophy group stage matches, as well as in the EFL Cup and FA Cup. He made his first league appearance on 28 November, in a 0–2 loss to Charlton Athletic, before going on to make six consecutive league starts, his longest run in the team to date. He made a return to the first-team after over three months out in a 0–0 draw with AFC Wimbledon on 24 April, saving a penalty to keep a clean sheet.

On 11 June 2021, the club announced that Cornell had left the club by mutual consent with a year remaining on his contract, after being informed that he was no longer in the club's plans for next season. He departed having made 15 appearances for the Blues in all competitions, keeping four clean sheets.

=== Peterborough United ===
On 29 June 2021, Cornell joined Peterborough United on a free transfer, signing a two-year contract. He started his career in Peterborough as a reserve keeper behind Christy Pym. He made his Peterborough debut in the EFL Cup on 10 August 2021, in a 4–0 loss. After Christy Pym bust-up with the Peterborough United boss Darren Ferguson in a 3–1 loss to Reading on 14 September 2021, Pym has been excluded from the first-team picture. This allowed Cornell to take his place for this season. He made his Championship debut in a 3–0 win against Birmingham City.

=== Preston North End ===
On 27 June 2022, Cornell signed on a two-year deal for Championship team Preston North End on a free transfer, after the expiration of his contract with Peterborough United.

=== Leicester City ===
On 18 September 2026, Cornell signed a one-year contract with EFL League One club Leicester City.

== International career ==
Cornell made his debut for the Wales under-17 side on 25 March 2007, in a 3–0 defeat to Belarus, and went on to win five caps at under-17 level, his last coming on 6 October 2007 in a 2–2 draw with Spain in the qualifying round of the 2008 UEFA European Under-17 Football Championship. In August 2009, he received his first call-up to the Wales under-21 side to face Italy, but remained on the bench.

In November 2009, he made his debut for the Wales under-19 side, playing in consecutive defeats to Portugal and Spain in the qualifying round of the 2010 UEFA European Under-19 Football Championship. The day after, Cornell was handed a shock call-up to the Wales senior squad, for their friendly match against Scotland due to the playing commitments of Owain Fôn Williams, and Lewis Price, and an injury to Boaz Myhill. Cornell however was not included in the matchday squad.

Cornell made his debut for the Wales under-21 side on 18 May 2010 in a 1–0 defeat to Austria under-21s.

Cornell was called up to the Wales senior squad again in October 2010 for the UEFA Euro 2012 qualifying match against Switzerland. He was an unused substitute in a match that Wales lost 4–1.

Cornell returned to the Wales squad after a long absence in September 2026 at the age of 35, replacing the injured Karl Darlow in the squad travelling for the UEFA Nations League matches against Portugal, Denmark and Norway. Cornell was an unused substitute.

== Personal life ==
Cornell often goes by the name 'Dai', a Welsh abbreviation of his first name.

== Career statistics ==
As of match played 21 January 2024

Appearances and goals by club, season and competition
Club	Season	League			National cup (Note: Includes FA Cup)		League cup (Note: Includes EFL Cup, Scottish League Cup)		Other		Total	
Club	Season	Division	Apps	Goals	Apps	Goals	Apps	Goals	Apps	Goals	Apps	Goals
Swansea City	2009–10	Championship	0	0	0	0	1	0	—		1	0
Swansea City	2010–11	Championship	0	0	0	0	0	0	—		0	0
Swansea City	2011–12	Premier League	0	0	0	0	0	0	—		0	0
Swansea City	2012–13	Premier League	0	0	0	0	0	0	—		0	0
Swansea City	2013–14	Premier League	0	0	0	0	0	0	0	0	0	0
Swansea City	2014–15	Premier League	0	0	0	0	0	0	—		0	0
Swansea City	Total		0	0	0	0	1	0	0	0	1	0
Port Talbot Town (loan)	2010–11	Welsh Premier League	14	0	0	0	—		—		14	0
Hereford United (loan)	2011–12	League Two	24	0	0	0	1	0	1 (Note: Appearance in Football League Trophy)	0	26	0
St Mirren (loan)	2013–14	Scottish Premiership	5	0	0	0	1	0	—		6	0
Portsmouth (loan)	2014–15	League Two	0	0	0	0	0	0	0	0	0	0
Oldham Athletic	2015–16	League One	14	0	1	0	1	0	1	0	17	0
Northampton Town	2016–17	League One	6	0	1	0	0	0	3 (Note: Appearance(s) in EFL Trophy)	0	10	0
Northampton Town	2017–18	League One	6	0	2	0	1	0	3	0	12	0
Northampton Town	2018–19	League Two	46	0	1	0	0	0	1	0	48	0
Northampton Town	2019–20	League Two	34	0	3	0	1	0	0	0	38	0
Northampton Town	Total		92	0	7	0	2	0	7	0	108	0
Ipswich Town	2020–21	League One	10	0	1	0	1	0	3	0	15	0
Peterborough United	2021–22	Championship	30	0	1	0	1	0	—		32	0
Preston North End	2022–23	Championship	0	0	0	0	1	0	—		1	0
Preston North End	2023–24	Championship	2	0	0	0	1	0	—		3	0
Preston North End	Total		2	0	0	0	2	0	0	0	4	0
Career total			191	0	9	0	10	0	12	0	222	0

== Honours ==
Northampton Town

- EFL League Two play-offs: 2020
