= Daniel Alfei =

Welsh footballer (born 1992)

Personal information
- Full name: Daniel Mark Alfei
- Date of birth: 23 February 1992 (age 34)
- Place of birth: Swansea, Wales
- Height: 5 ft 11 in (1.80 m)
- Position: Defender

Team information
- Current team: Pontardawe Town

Youth career
- 2006–2010: Swansea City

Senior career*
Years	Team	Apps	(Gls)
2010–2016	Swansea City	1	(0)
2012	→ Wrexham (loan)	5	(0)
2013	→ Wrexham (loan)	11	(0)
2014	→ Portsmouth (loan)	15	(0)
2014	→ Northampton Town (loan)	11	(0)
2016	→ Mansfield Town (loan)	12	(0)
2016–2017	Aberystwyth Town	18	(0)
2017–2018	Yeovil Town	2	(0)
2018–2019	Llanelli Town	5	(0)
2019–2020	Haverfordwest County		
2018–2019	Llanelli Town		
2020–2022	Llanelli Town	18	(1)
2022–2023	Briton Ferry Llansawel	31	(1)
2024–2025	Trefelin BGC	14	(0)
2026–	Pontardawe Town	6	(0)

International career^{‡}
2008–2009	Wales U17	11	(1)
2009–2011	Wales U19	13	(1)
2010–2014	Wales U21	13	(2)
- * Club domestic league appearances and goals as of 14:29, 1 October 2026 (UTC) ‡ National team caps and goals as of 19 May 2014

Daniel Mark Alfei (born 23 February 1992) is a Welsh footballer who plays as a defender for Cymru South club Pontardawe Town

== Swansea City ==
On 8 January 2011, Alfei made his professional debut for Swansea City in a 4–0 victory against Colchester United in the FA Cup, where he was named man of the match. Alfei made his league debut a week later, as an 88th-minute substitute against Crystal Palace. Alfei also played in Swansea's FA Cup fourth round tie against Leyton Orient in 2011. He signed a new three-year contract in April 2011.

On 9 May 2013, Alfei signed a new contract with Swansea until June 2016. Alfei was released in May 2016.

=== Wrexham loan ===
On transfer deadline day in January 2012 he signed for Conference National side Wrexham on a season long loan. He made his debut in a home win against Hayes & Yeading United where the Dragons won 4–1. He returned to Swansea at the end of the 2011–12 season. In October 2012 Alfei re-joined Wrexham on loan until January 2013. Wrexham extended Alfei's loan until the end of the 2012–2013 season.

=== Portsmouth loan ===
On 2 January 2014, Alfei joined League Two club Portsmouth on loan for one month. On 31 January 2014, Alfei's loan was extended until the end of the season.

=== Northampton Town loan ===
On 2 July 2014, Alfei signed for League Two club Northampton Town on a season long loan. Alfei made 14 appearances for Northampton before his loan was ended on 2 January 2015.

=== Mansfield Town loan ===
In February 2016, Alfei joined League Two club Mansfield Town on loan until the end of the season. Alfei went on to make 12 appearances for The Stags.

=== Aberystwyth Town ===
Alfei joined Aberystwyth Town on a free transfer in 2016. After making 18 appearances for them, Alfei was released at the end of the season.

=== Yeovil Town ===
On 28 July 2017, Alfei signed for League Two club Yeovil Town on a two-year contract. In only his fourth appearance for Yeovil, Alfei suffered a ruptured anterior cruciate ligament which ruled him out for the remainder of the 2017–18 season. He was released by Yeovil at the end of the 2017–18 season.

=== Llanelli Town ===
On 31 August 2018, Alfei signed for Welsh Premier League side Llanelli Town.

In June 2026 he joined Pontardawe Town.

== International career ==
Alfei represented and captained the Wales under-19 team and has played several times for the Wales under-21 team. In January 2013 he was selected in the Wales under 21 squad for the friendly match against Iceland on 6 February 2013.

Injuries saw Alfei called up for the Welsh senior side in October 2013, remaining on the bench in a 1–1 draw against Belgium.

== Career statistics ==
As of match played 23 September 2017.

Appearances and goals by club, season and competition
Club	Season	League			National Cup		League Cup		Other		Total	
Club	Season	Division	Apps	Goals	Apps	Goals	Apps	Goals	Apps	Goals	Apps	Goals
Swansea City	2010–11	Championship	1	0	2	0	0	0	0	0	3	0
Swansea City	2011–12	Premier League	0	0	0	0	1	0	—		1	0
Swansea City	2012–13	Premier League	0	0	0	0	0	0	—		0	0
Swansea City	2013–14	Premier League	0	0	0	0	0	0	0	0	0	0
Swansea City	2014–15	Premier League	0	0	—		—		—		0	0
Swansea City	2015–16	Premier League	0	0	0	0	0	0	—		0	0
Swansea City	Total		1	0	2	0	1	0	0	0	4	0
Wrexham (loan)	2011–12	Conference Premier	5	0	0	0	—		1 (Note: Appearance in Conference Premier play-offs)	0	6	0
Wrexham (loan)	2012–13	Conference Premier	11	0	0	0	—		4 (Note: Appearances in FA Trophy)	0	15	0
Wrexham (loan)	Total		16	0	0	0	—		5	0	21	0
Portsmouth (loan)	2013–14	League Two	15	0	0	0	0	0	0	0	15	0
Northampton Town (loan)	2014–15	League Two	11	0	1	0	1	0	1 (Note: Appearance in Football League Trophy)	0	14	0
Mansfield Town (loan)	2015–16	League Two	12	0	0	0	0	0	0	0	12	0
Aberystwyth Town	2016–17	Welsh Premier League	18	0	2	0	1	0	—		21	0
Yeovil Town	2017–18	League Two	2	0	0	0	1	0	1 (Note: Appearance in EFL Trophy)	0	4	0
Career totals			75	0	5	0	4	0	7	0	91	0
