= Gerhard Tremmel =

German footballer (born 1978)

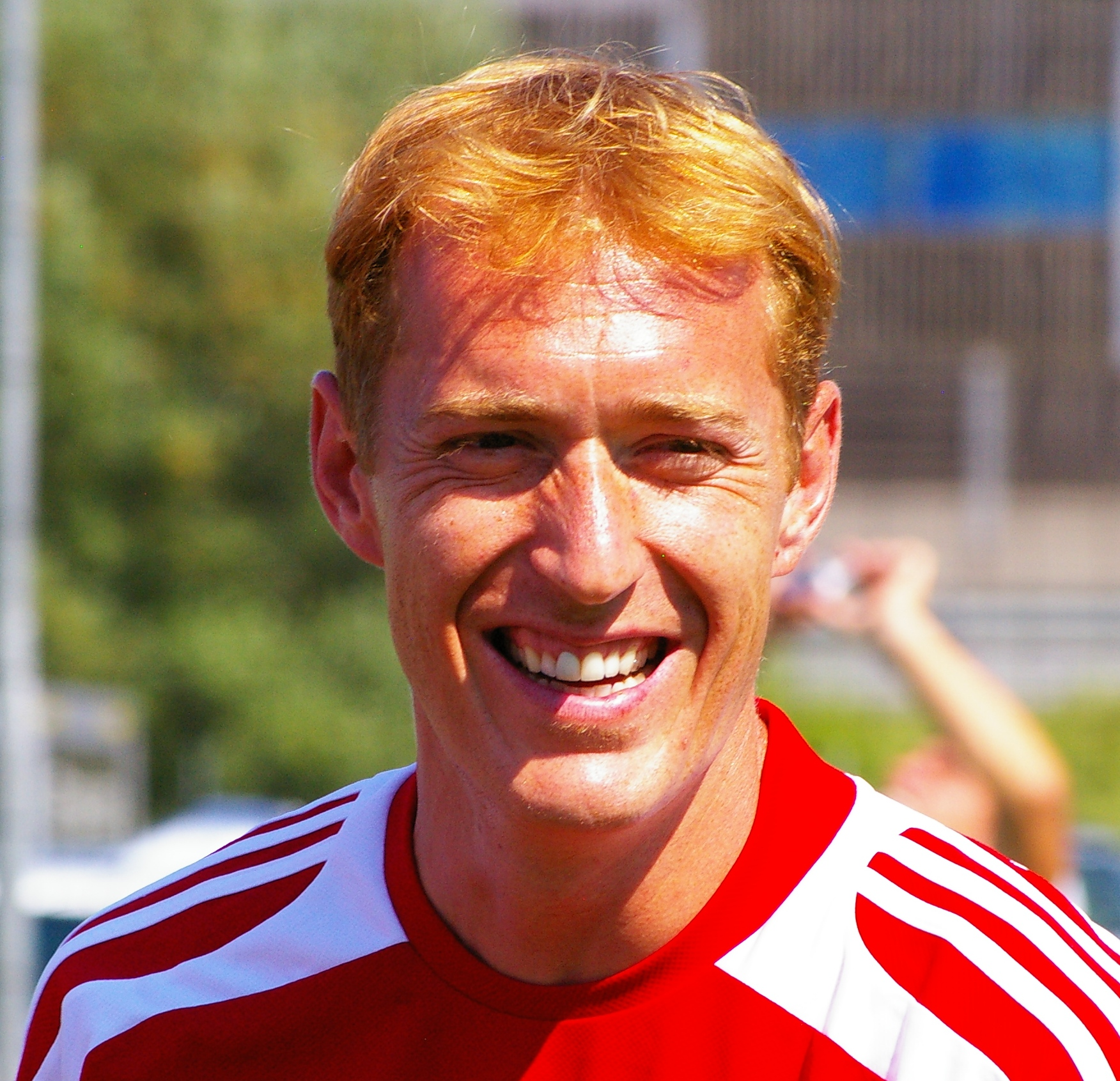
- Tremmel with Salzburg in 2010

Personal information
- Full name: Gerhard Martin Tremmel
- Date of birth: 16 November 1978 (age 48)
- Place of birth: Munich, West Germany
- Height: 1.90 m (6 ft 3 in)
- Position: Goalkeeper

Team information
- Current team: Swansea City (scout)

Youth career
- 1983–1987: SV Lochhausen
- 1987–1990: Bayern Munich
- 1990–1991: SC Olching
- 1991–1992: 1860 Munich
- 1992–1998: SpVgg Unterhaching

Senior career*
Years	Team	Apps	(Gls)
1998–2002	SpVgg Unterhaching	68	(0)
2002–2004	Hannover 96	22	(0)
2004–2005	Hertha BSC II	15	(0)
2004–2006	Hertha BSC	5	(0)
2006–2010	Energie Cottbus	93	(0)
2010–2011	Red Bull Salzburg	28	(0)
2011–2017	Swansea City	29	(0)
2016	→ Werder Bremen (loan)	0	(0)
Total		260	(0)
- * Club domestic league appearances and goals

Gerhard Martin "Gerry" Tremmel (born 16 November 1978) is a German former professional footballer who played as a goalkeeper. He works as a scout for Swansea City, and a co-commentator for Bundesliga world feed.

Tremmel played in the Premier League, Bundesliga, UEFA Champions League and UEFA Europa League. He holds a number of goalkeeping records. At a rate of 4.2, he had the best saves-per-goal-conceded ratio in the Premier League for the 2012–13 season. He also had the best save percentage in the Premier League that season, at 80.9%. His saves-to-shots ratio in the Premier League and on a European basis made him second only to Manuel Neuer of Bayern Munich.

== Playing career ==
=== Early career ===
Tremmel's previous clubs include Bayern Munich and 1860 Munich, where he spent three years as a youth, before joining SpVgg Unterhaching where he made his senior debut.

Tremmel left Bavaria in 2002 for spells at Hannover 96 then Hertha BSC, where he spent 2004–05 in the reserve side. He then joined Energie Cottbus in 2006 on a two-year contract, announcing his intention to leave the club on 29 April 2010. On 7 May 2010, his transfer to Hertha for the upcoming season was confirmed, but the transfer failed and he signed for Red Bull Salzburg instead on 20 May 2010.

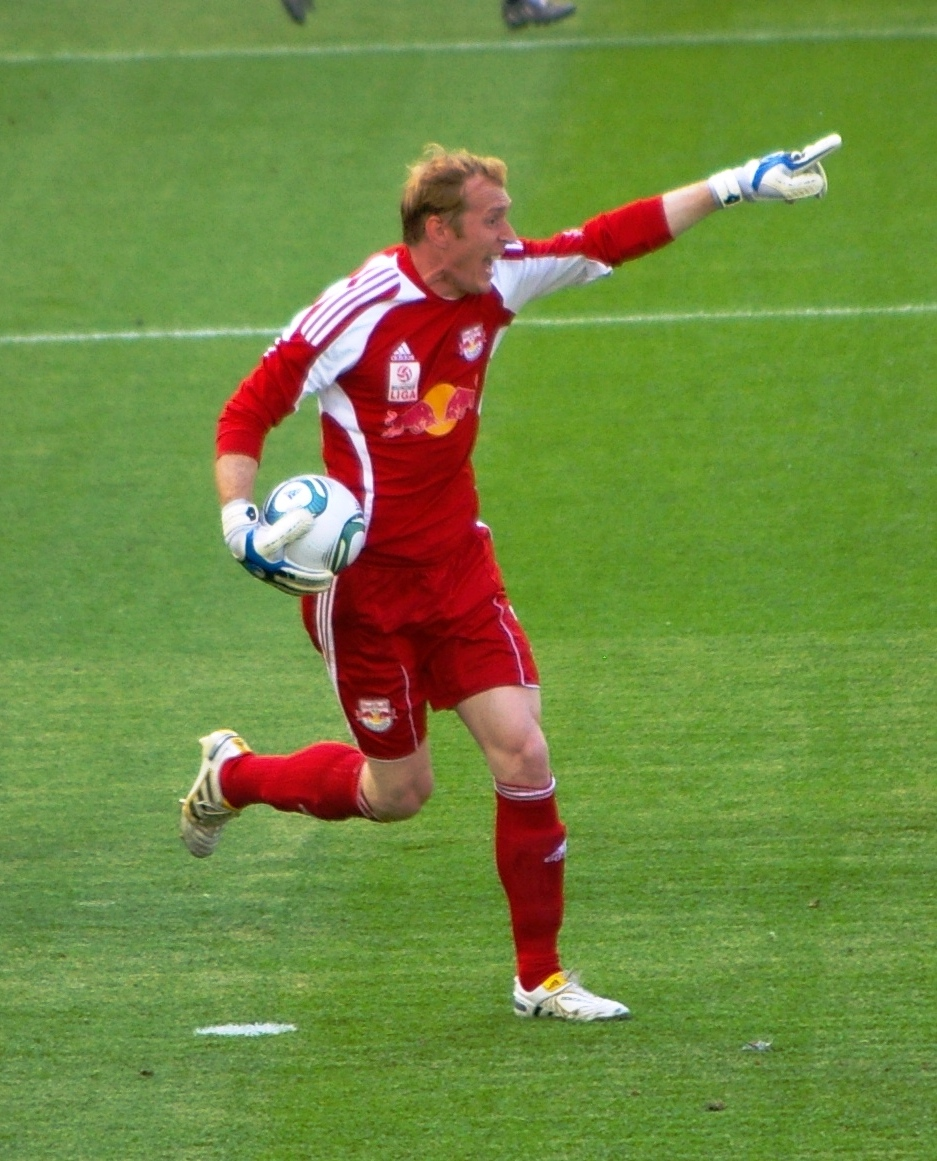
Tremmel playing for Red Bull Salzburg in 2011

=== Swansea City ===
Tremmel joined Swansea City on 30 August 2011 on a free transfer following their promotion to the Premier League. Swansea manager Brendan Rodgers had brought Tremmel to South Wales and signed him after his impressive pre-season performances against Celtic and Real Betis.

Tremmel made his competitive debut for Swansea on 7 January 2012 in an FA Cup fixture at Barnsley, helping his team to a 2–4 away win. He made his Premier League debut on 26 February 2012 in a 2–0 away loss against Stoke City at the Britannia Stadium.

Tremmel made his fourth appearance for Swansea, and his first in the 2012–13 season, in a 3–1 win against Barnsley in the League Cup.

Following an injury suffered by first choice goalkeeper Michel Vorm on 27 October 2012, Tremmel started to have a run of games in the Swansea team for the first time. Swansea, now with Tremmel in the side, went on a seven-match unbeaten run that included memorable away wins at Liverpool in the League Cup, and Newcastle United and Arsenal in the Premier League. He also managed to keep clean sheets against the likes of Chelsea, Arsenal and Liverpool. These performances were met with praise from then-manager Michael Laudrup, who said, "Gerhard has done well and it is very important to know you have a goalkeeper of quality when things happen."

On 7 February 2013, Swansea announced that they had extended their contract with the Bavarian until the summer of 2015.

On 24 February 2013, Tremmel helped Swansea beat Bradford City 5–0 to win the 2012–13 League Cup by the competition's highest-ever winning margin for the final. This achievement landed Swansea's first major trophy as well as qualification for the 2013–14 UEFA Europa League. German mass tabloid Bild hailed Tremmel's "career highlight" at the "legendary" Wembley Stadium and a just reward for 15 years of hard work and professionalism in the game.

On 28 May 2015, Tremmel confirmed that he would not be renewing his contract with Swansea and would therefore be released by the club. On 11 August, however, he re-joined the side, signing a two-year contract to keep him at the club until June 2017. On 22 May 2017, the club announced his release along with seven other players after he had only appeared in the EFL Trophy during the 2016–17 season.

=== Werder Bremen ===
Tremmel was loaned out to Werder Bremen, in his native Germany, on 28 January 2016.

== Post-playing career ==
Following his release by Swansea City at the end of 2016–17 season, Tremmel took up the position of a scout for the club.

== Career statistics ==
Appearances and goals by club, season and competition
Club	Season	League			Cup		League Cup		Europe		Other		Total	
Club	Season	Division	Apps	Goals	Apps	Goals	Apps	Goals	Apps	Goals	Apps	Goals	Apps	Goals
SpVgg Unterhaching	1997–98	2. Bundesliga	0	0	0	0	—		—		—		0	0
SpVgg Unterhaching	1998–99	2. Bundesliga	0	0	0	0	—		—		—		0	0
SpVgg Unterhaching	1999–2000	Bundesliga	7	0	0	0	—		—		—		7	0
SpVgg Unterhaching	2000–01	Bundesliga	32	0	1	0	—		—		—		33	0
SpVgg Unterhaching	2001–02	2. Bundesliga	29	0	1	0	—		—		—		30	0
SpVgg Unterhaching	Total		68	0	2	0	—		—		—		70	0
Hannover 96	2002–03	Bundesliga	18	0	0	0	—		—		—		18	0
Hannover 96	2003–04	Bundesliga	4	0	1	0	—		—		—		5	0
Hannover 96	Total		22	0	1	0	—		—		—		23	0
Hertha BSC II	2004–05	Regionalliga Nord	15	0	0	0	—		—		—		15	0
Hertha BSC	2004–05	Bundesliga	0	0	0	0	—		—		—		0	0
Hertha BSC	2005–06	Bundesliga	5	0	1	0	1	0	—		—		7	0
Hertha BSC	Total		5	0	1	0	1	0	—		—		7	0
Energie Cottbus	2006–07	Bundesliga	1	0	1	0	—		—		—		2	0
Energie Cottbus	2007–08	Bundesliga	24	0	1	0	—		—		—		25	0
Energie Cottbus	2008–09	Bundesliga	34	0	3	0	—		2	0	—		39	0
Energie Cottbus	2009–10	2. Bundesliga	34	0	1	0	—		—		—		35	0
Energie Cottbus	Total		93	0	5	0	—		2	0	—		100	0
Red Bull Salzburg	2010–11	Austrian Bundesliga	28	0	0	0	—		10	0	—		38	0
Swansea City	2011–12	Premier League	1	0	2	0	0	0	—		—		3	0
Swansea City	2012–13	Premier League	14	0	0	0	7	0	—		—		21	0
Swansea City	2013–14	Premier League	12	0	0	0	1	0	6	0	—		19	0
Swansea City	2014–15	Premier League	2	0	1	0	3	0	—		—		6	0
Swansea City	2015–16	Premier League	0	0	0	0	0	0	—		—		0	0
Swansea City	2016–17	Premier League	0	0	0	0	0	0	—		—		0	0
Swansea City	Total		29	0	3	0	11	0	6	0	—		49	0
Swansea City U23	2016–17	—			—		—		—		4 (Note: Appearances in EFL Trophy)	0	4	0
Werder Bremen (loan)	2015–16	Bundesliga	0	0	0	0	—		—				0	0
Career total			260	0	13	0	12	0	18	0	4	0	307	0

== Honours ==
Swansea City

- Football League Cup: 2012–13
