= Nathan Dyer =

English footballer

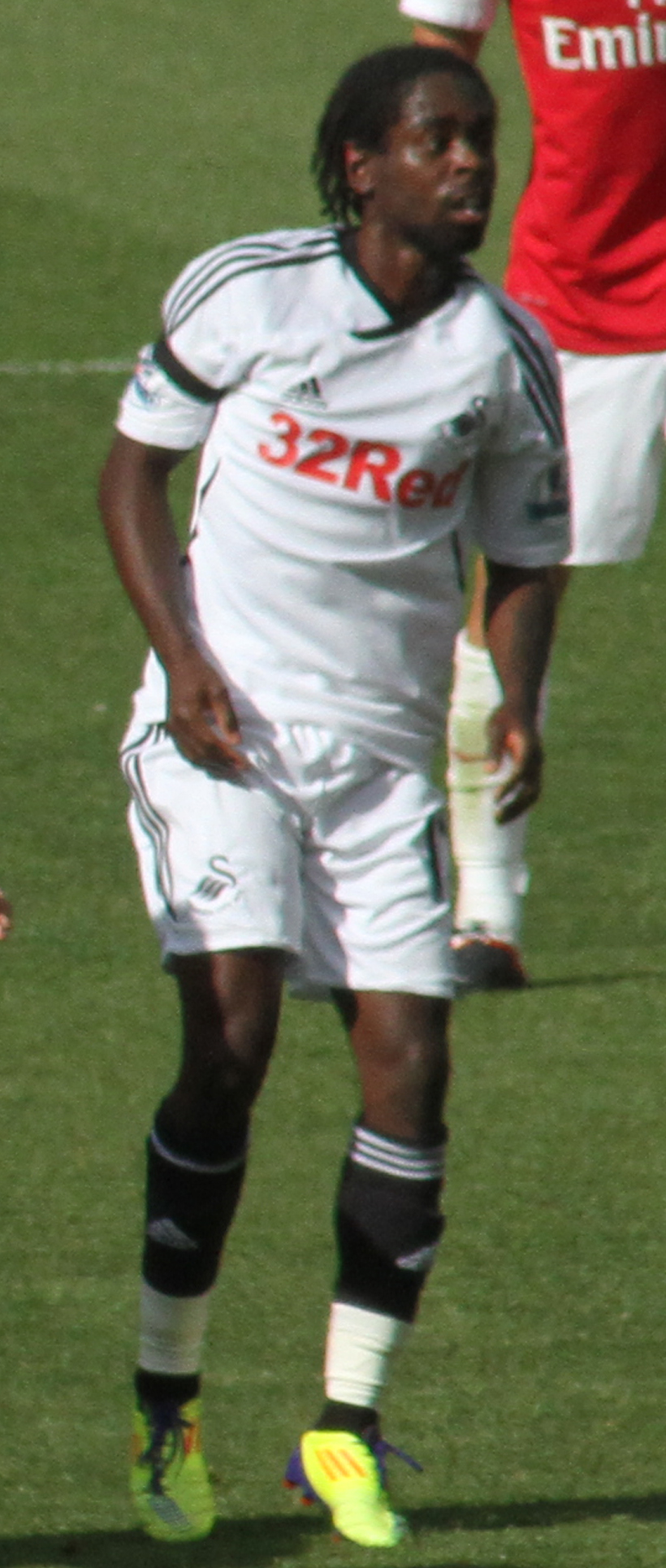
- Dyer playing for Swansea City in 2011

Personal information
- Full name: Nathan Antone Jonah Dyer
- Date of birth: 29 November 1987 (age 38)
- Place of birth: Trowbridge, England
- Height: 5 ft 4 in (1.63 m)
- Position: Winger

Youth career
- 1995–2005: Southampton

Senior career*
Years	Team	Apps	(Gls)
2005–2009	Southampton	56	(1)
2005	→ Burnley (loan)	5	(2)
2008–2009	→ Sheffield United (loan)	7	(1)
2009	→ Swansea City (loan)	17	(2)
2009–2020	Swansea City	281	(24)
2015–2016	→ Leicester City (loan)	12	(1)
Total		378	(31)

International career
2005–2006	England U19	6	(0)
- * Club domestic league appearances and goals

Nathan Antony Jonah Dyer (born 29 November 1987) is an English former professional footballer who played as a winger, spending most of his career at Swansea City, where he made over 300 appearances. He started playing as a teenager at Southampton, making the first team. He has also had loan spells with Sheffield United, Burnley and Leicester City, where he was part of the team that won the 2015–16 Premier League.

== Early life ==
Dyer was born and raised in Trowbridge, Wiltshire. His father loved cricket, and his mother was an amateur sprinter. Dyer grew up supporting Manchester United.

== Club career ==
=== Southampton ===
Dyer joined the Southampton F.C. Academy as a teenager and was a member of the Southampton youth team that reached the finals of the FA Youth Cup in 2005, although he did not make his playing debut until the following season. Ultimately, the team lost on aggregate to Ipswich Town.

Dyer made his first team debut for Southampton on 26 December 2005, as a substitute after 87 minutes, in a match that resulted in a 2–0 win over Crewe Alexandra. In late 2005, he enjoyed a successful spell on loan to Burnley, where he scored two goals against Millwall and Crewe during a total of five appearances. He was recalled, despite pleas from Steve Cotterill to stay until the end of the season. After his loan to Burnley, Dyer signed a new contract at Southampton, where he played on the first team squad for the rest of his time with the club.

Dyer scored his first league goal for Southampton during a match that ended in a 3–2 defeat against Watford in September 2007. This took his Southampton goal tally up to three, having already scored in League Cup matches against Southend United and Yeovil Town. His performance earned him the interest of Southampton's rival in the South Coast derby Portsmouth. The club was keen to sign him, but their public pursuit of him drew criticism from Southampton manager George Burley.

On 24 July 2008, after a long period of uncertainty and an extended contract dispute, Dyer signed a new three-year deal with Southampton, keeping him at the club until 2011. Dyer was excluded from the first team and left out of the pre-season preparations until he signed the contract.

In September 2008, after failing to make it onto Southampton's first team and establish himself under managers Jan Poortvliet and Mark Wotte, Dyer was sent to Sheffield United on loan until December, with the option of a permanent deal in January 2009. The move was part of a loan swap deal, with Jordan Robertson joining Southampton for the same duration.

Dyer made his first appearance for the Blades the next day as a late substitute in a match that resulted in a 2–1 victory over Watford. He was unable to gain a permanent place on the Sheffield team, and he played less than thirty minutes in a Blades shirt over the next three months. He made the first team starting line-up on 20 December, when he scored his first goal for the club in a match that resulted in a 2–2 draw with Palace.

=== Swansea City ===
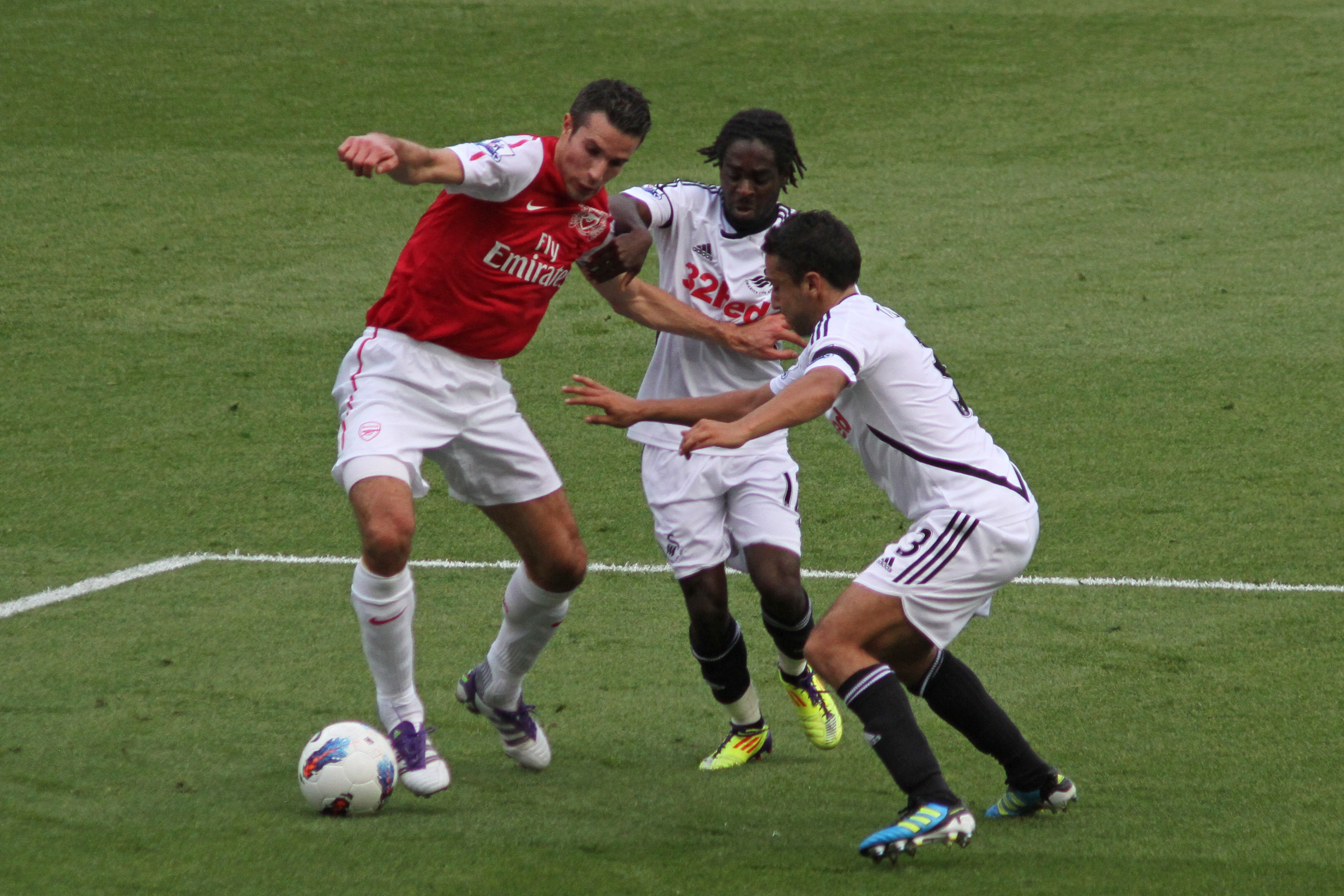
Dyer along with Neil Taylor attempt to tackle Robin van Persie

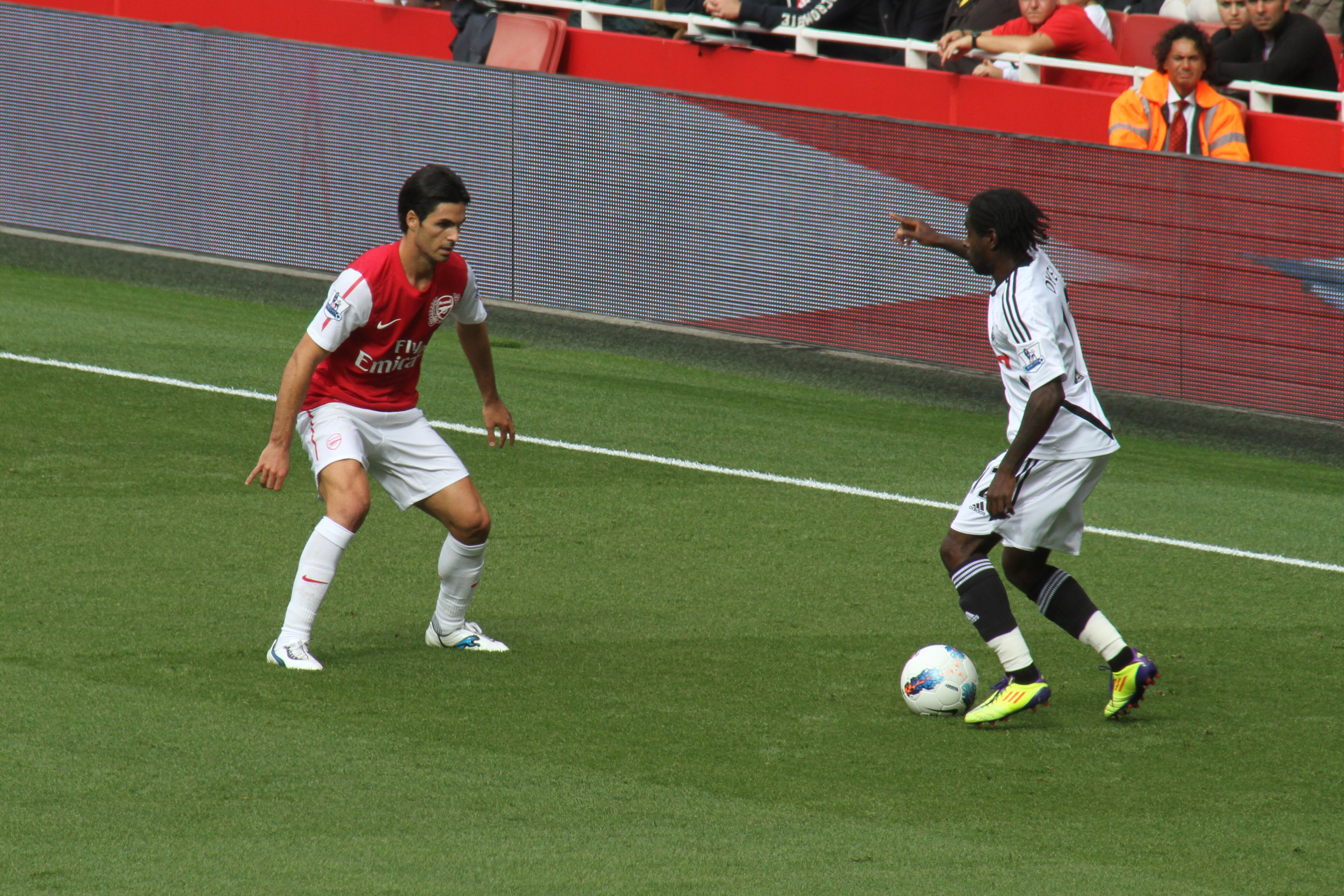
Dyer attempts to get past Mikel Arteta

Dyer returned to Southampton following the end of his three-month loan and was immediately loaned out again, this time to Swansea City until the end of the 2008–09 season. He impressed his new coach in his debut match with a 2–0 win at home to Reading.

On 24 January 2009, Dyer scored in Swansea's FA Cup victory over Portsmouth, resulting in the FA Cup-holders Portsmouth's exit from the tournament. On 28 February 2009, Dyer scored his first league goal for Swansea, scoring the only goal in the match against Charlton Athletic.

On 5 April 2009, he scored the opening goal for Swansea against their archrivals Cardiff City.

On 2 June 2009, Dyer joined Swansea City on a permanent basis after the Welsh side agreed to pay a £400,000 fee to Southampton. He made his debut in the opening match of the 2009–10 season against Leicester City, playing the full 90 minutes. He scored his first goal as a permanent member of the squad, a match winning score against Sheffield United, on 26 September 2009. On 7 November 2009, Dyer scored his second goal in two matches against Cardiff City, when his header from close range helped the Swans claim a 3–2 victory in the local derby. He scored again in a 1–1 draw against Queens Park Rangers.

Dyer started the 2010–11 season with strong performances, including during the new coach Brendan Rodgers' home match for Swansea City: a 4–0 rout against Preston in which Dyer scored one goal and set up a goal for David Cotterill. His second goal of the season came when he scored the opening goal in a 4–3 victory over Middlesbrough on 12 February 2011. His form was sustained throughout the campaign, and he was eventually named Swansea City Supporters' Player of the Year 2010–11. Dyer played an important role in the Football League Championship's play-off final in which he made a double assist, for both Stephen Dobbie and Scott Sinclair, in a 4–2 win over Reading. That victory earned Swansea a promotion to the Premier League, making them the first Welsh club to ever play in the league.

Before the start of the 2011–12 season, Dyer signed a new contract with the Swansea club that expired in 2014. Dyer was in fine form for much of the 2011–12 season, in which Swansea City had an impressive run for a promoted side in the Premier League. Dyer scored his first Premier League goal in a 3–0 win over West Bromwich Albion on 17 September 2011. In a 3–1 victory over Bolton Wanderers, Dyer's pace and trickery on the field were extremely effective and earned him praise from his coach, Brendan Rodgers. Dyer contributed to a 3–2 victory over Arsenal by winning a controversial penalty and by scoring a goal, his third in three matches (including goals in a 4–2 win against Barnsley that sent Swansea to the next round in the FA Cup, and in a 2–0 victory over Aston Villa). Dyer earned press attention in the 3–2 win over Arsenal when Arsène Wenger accused Dyer of purposely diving onto the ground to draw a foul. On 3 March 2012, Dyer received a red card for a foul on Jordi Gómez during a match which resulted in a 2–0 win over Wigan Athletic. After the match, Dyer defended his tackle, stating he was not a 'malicious player', but the league suspended him for three matches. On 14 April 2012, Dyer scored in a 3–0 win over Blackburn Rovers, bringing his league goal tally to four for the season. On 24 April 2012, Dyer scored his fifth goal of the season and set up another goal for Danny Graham in a match that ended in a 4–4 draw against Wolverhampton Wanderers. On the opening day of the new Premier League campaign at Queens Park Rangers, Dyer scored a brace of goals, and Swansea achieved a 5–0 victory.

On 22 September 2012, Dyer came on as a half-time substitute for Swansea in a match against Everton at Liberty Stadium. He was booked in the 55th minute for dissent. Three minutes later, he received a second yellow card after a late tackle on Everton defender Leighton Baines. He was sent off for his second booking, having been on the pitch for only 12 minutes. Swansea lost the match 0–3.

On 24 February 2013, Dyer started the League Cup final for Swansea and netted the opening goal as well as the third in a 5–0 thrashing of opponents Bradford City. His goals thus helped Swansea win their first major trophy. Dyer's involvement was also notable as he was seen arguing with teammates over the taker for the spot kick early in the second half. Dyer was awarded the Man of the Match. After the match was over, Dyer said that not scoring a hat-trick was a disappointment, hence the wish to take the penalty, though the victory was the club's "massive" achievement. Afterwards, Dyer expressed a desire to stay at the club and described Michu as the calmest player he knew.

On 6 August 2013, Dyer signed a new four-year deal with the club, keeping him at the Liberty Stadium until June 2017.

Dyer announced his retirement from professional football on 30 July 2021.

==== Leicester City (loan) ====
On 1 September 2015, Dyer joined Leicester City on a season-long loan deal.

He made his debut on 13 September 2015 as a half-time substitute in Leicester's home match against Aston Villa, and he scored the winning goal in the 89th minute as Leicester came from 2–0 down to win the match 3–2.

At Leicester, he was a member of the team that won the club's first top-flight title of their 132-year history.

== International career ==
In October 2012, Dyer was approached by the Jamaica Football Federation to play for Jamaica during their 2014 FIFA World Cup qualifying campaign, but his agent said he was unavailable for another six months.

== Career statistics ==
Appearances and goals by club, season and competition
Club	Season	League			FA Cup		League Cup		Other		Total	
Club	Season	Division	Apps	Goals	Apps	Goals	Apps	Goals	Apps	Goals	Apps	Goals
Southampton	2005–06	Championship	17	0	3	0	2	1	—		22	1
Southampton	2006–07	Championship	18	0	0	0	3	1	0	0	21	1
Southampton	2007–08	Championship	17	1	0	0	1	0	—		18	1
Southampton	2008–09	Championship	4	0	0	0	1	0	—		5	0
Southampton	Total		56	1	3	0	7	2	0	0	66	3
Burnley (loan)	2005–06	Championship	5	2	—		—		—		5	2
Sheffield United (loan)	2008–09	Championship	7	1	—		—		—		7	1
Swansea City (loan)	2008–09	Championship	17	2	4	1	—		—		21	3
Swansea City	2009–10	Championship	40	2	0	0	2	0	—		42	2
Swansea City	2010–11	Championship	46	2	1	0	2	0	3 (Note: Appearances in Championship play-offs)	0	52	2
Swansea City	2011–12	Premier League	34	5	2	1	0	0	—		36	6
Swansea City	2012–13	Premier League	37	3	2	0	5	3	—		44	6
Swansea City	2013–14	Premier League	27	6	1	0	0	0	9 (Note: Appearance in UEFA Europa League)	0	37	6
Swansea City	2014–15	Premier League	32	3	2	1	3	1	—		37	5
Swansea City	2015–16	Premier League	1	0	—		1	1	—		2	1
Swansea City	2016–17	Premier League	8	0	1	0	1	0	—		10	0
Swansea City	2017–18	Premier League	24	0	6	3	0	0	—		30	3
Swansea City	2018–19	Championship	22	2	2	1	0	0	—		24	3
Swansea City	2019–20	Championship	10	1	1	0	1	0	—		12	1
Swansea City	Total		298	26	22	7	15	5	12	0	347	38
Leicester City (loan)	2015–16	Premier League	12	1	2	0	—		—		14	1
Career total			378	31	27	7	22	7	12	0	439	45

== Honours ==
Swansea City

- Football League Championship play-offs: 2011
- Football League Cup: 2012–13

Leicester City

- Premier League: 2015–16

Individual

- Swansea City Player of the Year: 2010–11
- Alan Hardaker Trophy: 2013
