= James Loveridge =

Welsh footballer

Personal information
- Date of birth: 16 May 1994 (age 32)
- Place of birth: Llanelli, Wales
- Position: Forward

Youth career
- 2010–2012: Swansea City

Senior career*
Years	Team	Apps	(Gls)
2012–2015	Swansea City	0	(0)
2014	→ Milton Keynes Dons (loan)	7	(0)
2014	→ Newport County (loan)	7	(0)
2015–2017	Port Talbot Town	20	(0)
2017–2020	Llanelli Town		
2020–2021	Haverfordwest County		
2021–2022	Briton Ferry Llansawel		
2022–2023	Llanelli Town		

International career
2010	Wales U17	3	(0)
2011	Wales U19	2	(0)
- * Club domestic league appearances and goals as of 05 January 2019

James Loveridge (born 16 May 1994) is a Welsh footballer who plays as a forward.

== Club career ==
=== Swansea City ===
In 2010, Loveridge joined the youth academy of Swansea City. During his youth years, Loveridge scored goals against Liverpool, Portsmouth and Manchester United in the FA Youth Cup. In May 2012, Loveridge was offered his first professional contract with Swansea City. On 19 April 2013, Loveridge signed a new one-year contract with Swansea, keeping him at the club until June 2014. After a loan spell at Milton Keynes Dons, Loveridge was rewarded with a new one-year contract with Swansea until June 2015.

=== Milton Keynes Dons (loan) ===
In March 2014, Loveridge was loaned to Milton Keynes Dons of League One for one month. Manager Karl Robinson commented "He's quick, he's a good size and I like the fact he's grounded in the Swansea way. He can play anywhere across the top three but wants to be a number nine." Loveridge made his debut for the club against Stevenage coming as a 46th-minute substitute for Izale McLeod. Loveridge's loan was subsequently extended for the final two games of the 2013–14 season.

=== Newport County (loan) ===
On 2 October 2014, Loveridge joined League Two club Newport County on an initial one-month loan that was subsequently extended. He made his debut for Newport on 4 October as a second-half substitute in the 1–0 defeat at Oxford United.

=== Port Talbot Town ===
Following his release from Swansea, Loveridge joined Welsh Premier League team Port Talbot Town.

=== Llanelli Town ===
In January 2017, Loveridge signed for Llanelli Town.

== International career ==
Loveridge has represented Wales at both under-17 and under-19 level. On 15 March 2014, Loveridge received his first call-up for the Wales under-21 squad as a replacement for the injured Tom Lawrence.

== Career statistics ==
As of 2 May 2015

Appearances and goals by club, season and competition
Club	Season	League			FA Cup		League Cup		Other		Total	
Club	Season	Division	Apps	Goals	Apps	Goals	Apps	Goals	Apps	Goals	Apps	Goals
Swansea City	2012–13	Premier League	0	0	0	0	0	0	—		0	0
Swansea City	2013–14	Premier League	0	0	0	0	0	0	0	0	0	0
Swansea City	2014–15	Premier League	0	0	0	0	0	0	—		0	0
Swansea City	Total		0	0	0	0	0	0	0	0	0	0
MK Dons	2013–14	League One	7	0	0	0	0	0	—		7	0
Newport County	2014–15	League Two	7	0	1	0	0	0	—		8	0
Career total			14	0	1	0	0	0	0	0	15	0
