= Michel Vorm =

Dutch former professional footballer (born 1983)

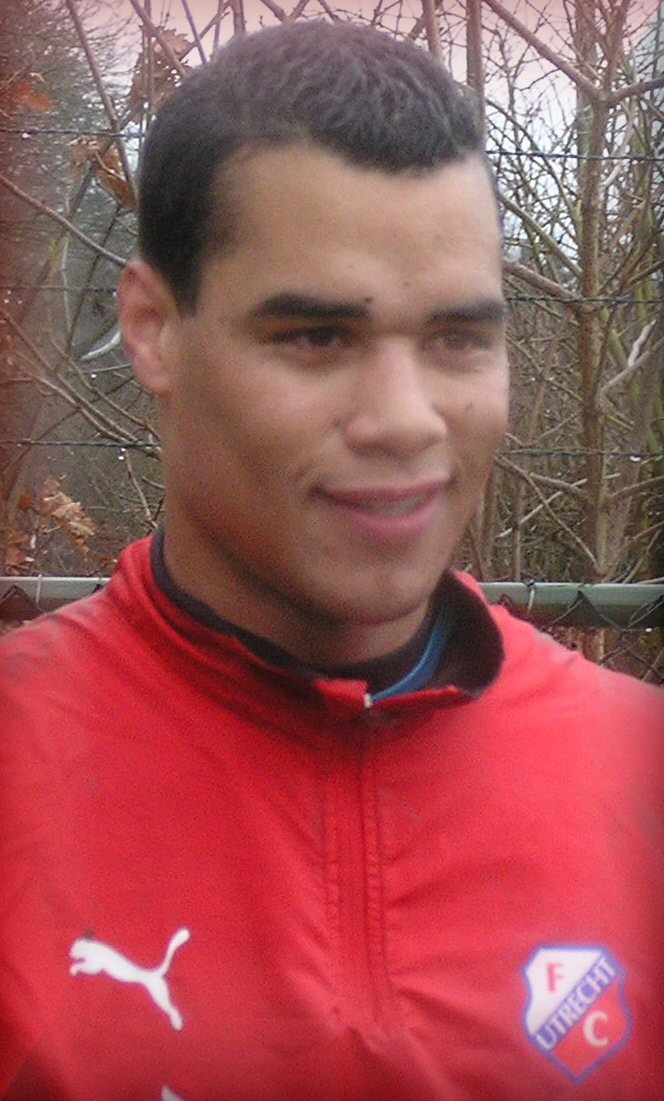
- Vorm in 2007

Personal information
- Full name: Michel Armand Vorm
- Date of birth: 20 October 1983 (age 43)
- Place of birth: IJsselstein, Netherlands
- Height: 1.83 m (6 ft 0 in)
- Position: Goalkeeper

Youth career
- JSV Nieuwegein

Senior career*
Years	Team	Apps	(Gls)
2005–2011	Utrecht	137	(0)
2005–2006	→ Den Bosch (loan)	35	(0)
2011–2014	Swansea City	89	(0)
2014–2020	Tottenham Hotspur	13	(0)
Total		274	(0)

International career
2008–2014	Netherlands	15	(0)
Medal record
Representing Netherlands
Men's football
FIFA World Cup
Runner-up	2010 South Africa	Team
Bronze medal – third place	2014 Brazil	Team
UEFA European Under-21 Championship
Winner	2006 Portugal
- * Club domestic league appearances and goals

Michel Armand Vorm (born 20 October 1983) is a Dutch former professional footballer who played as a goalkeeper. Following his playing career, he was also a goalkeeping coach at Tottenham Hotspur.

Vorm began his professional career at FC Utrecht in 2005, spending his first season on loan at FC Den Bosch. He transferred to Swansea City in 2011, playing three Premier League seasons and winning the League Cup in 2013. Vorm joined Tottenham Hotspur for £3.5 million in 2014, and announced his retirement in 2020.

A full international for the Netherlands from 2008 to 2014, Vorm earned 15 caps in total for the senior team. He was part of Dutch squads for 2010 and 2014 FIFA World Cups and UEFA Euro 2012.

== Club career ==
=== FC Utrecht ===
Born in IJsselstein to a Dutch mother and a Surinamese father, Vorm began his career at FC Utrecht. In order to gain more experience, he spent the 2005–06 season on loan to FC Den Bosch. He made his debut on 12 August 2005 against FC Emmen, the first of 35 appearances that season.

In August 2006, Vorm made his debut for Utrecht against Willem II. Although he joined FC Utrecht as the third-choice goalkeeper, behind Franck Grandel and Joost Terol, his pre-season performances impressed manager Foeke Booy, and saw him promoted to first choice keeper at the start of the league season. During this first season Vorm played 33 out of 34 matches, and his position as number one at the club remained unchallenged thereafter. Vorm missed a handful matches during the 2007–08 season due to knee and shoulder injuries. He left Utrecht at the start of the 2011–12 season, having played 136 matches in the Eredivisie.

=== Swansea City ===
In August 2011, Vorm joined Swansea City for a fee of around £1.5 million. He took the vacant number 1 shirt and made his debut for the club against Manchester City on 15 August 2011 in a 4–0 defeat. Although he conceded four goals, he also made eleven saves – more than any other Premier League goalkeeper, in a single match, in the whole of the 2011–12 season. In his second match for Swansea against Wigan Athletic, on 20 August, Vorm saved a 72nd-minute penalty from Ben Watson, to give Swansea their first ever point in the Premier League. On 6 November 2011, Vorm arguably saved Swansea from defeat against Liverpool and earned them the draw at Anfield by pulling off two outstanding saves to earn the clean sheet. On 10 December, he was instrumental in Swansea's 2–0 win over Fulham as he saved Clint Dempsey's 87th-minute penalty, with Swansea 1–0 up.

During his first season with Swansea he helped keep 13 clean sheets in 37 league appearances. His performances were so impressive that he won three awards at the club's end-of-season dinner – Supporters' Player of the Year, Players' Player and the Away Player awards.

On 27 September 2012, Vorm signed a new four-year contract with Swansea. On 28 October 2012, he was ruled out for up to eight weeks due to a groin injury picked up in a match against Manchester City. On 3 November 2013, in the South Wales derby against Cardiff City, Vorm was shown a straight red card by referee Mike Dean for a stoppage-time foul on Fraizer Campbell. The match ended 1–0 to Cardiff City.

=== Tottenham Hotspur ===
On 23 July 2014, Vorm announced via Dutch radio that he would sign for Tottenham Hotspur to compete with Hugo Lloris. He signed on a four-year deal costing Spurs £3.5 million after three years at Swansea, joining on the same day as Swansea's Ben Davies made the same move and Gylfi Sigurðsson was exchanged as part of the deal. The transfer was disputed by Utrecht, who complained to FIFA that they were contractually due 30% of the fee received by Swansea. FIFA rejected Utrecht's claim, and the case was heard in the Court of Arbitration for Sport in January 2016.

He made his debut for Tottenham on 24 September, in the third round of the League Cup at home against Nottingham Forest. Despite conceding first to Jorge Grant, Tottenham won 3–1. Vorm featured again in the next round on 29 October, keeping his first clean sheet for the club as Tottenham defeated Brighton & Hove Albion 2–0. Eight days later he played his first UEFA Europa League match for Tottenham, a 2–1 win away to Asteras Tripoli.

Vorm's first league appearance for Tottenham came on 21 March 2015, after Lloris went off injured in the fourth minute of a home match against Leicester City. Tottenham won 4–3. On 5 April he made his first league start, a goalless draw against Burnley at Turf Moor. On 13 August 2016, Vorm made his first appearance of the 2016–17 season for Tottenham Hotspur in a 1–1 draw with Everton at Goodison Park, in which he replaced the injured Lloris after 35 minutes.

Vorm's contract was extended in 2018, however, in the 2018–19 season, he was replaced as the number two goalkeeper for Tottenham by Paulo Gazzaniga, having started in fewer games when Hugo Lloris was not available. After the 2018–19 season Vorm was released by Tottenham following the end of his contract with the club.

Three months into the 2019–20 season, Vorm re-signed on a contract until the end of the season as cover for Gazzaniga who had stepped into the starting eleven to replace the injured Lloris. Vorm made his first appearance of the season in the FA Cup match against Norwich City on 5 March 2020, which ended in a loss after a penalty shoot-out. On 27 July 2020, Tottenham confirmed that Vorm would be leaving the club following the end of the season.

On 26 October 2020, Vorm announced his retirement from professional football at the age of 37.

== International career ==
In 2006, he was a member of the Netherlands squad that won the 2006 UEFA European Under-21 Championship in Portugal.

Vorm played his first match for the senior national team on 14 November 2008, replacing Henk Timmer at half time in a 3–1 home friendly win, conceding to Kim Källström within four minutes of coming on. He made his first start on 5 September 2009 in a friendly home match against Japan (3–0 win), followed up four days later by an impressive performance at Hampden Park during the World Cup qualifier Scotland – Netherlands, a match won 1–0 by the Netherlands. At Hampden Park, this was Vorm's first competitive match ever outside the Netherlands.

=== 2010 World Cup ===
Vorm was included in the preliminary squad for the 2010 FIFA World Cup in South Africa. On 27 May 2010, Netherlands manager Bert van Marwijk announced that the player would be part of the final squad of 23 participating in the FIFA World Cup. Before the start of the competition he was allowed to fly back to the Netherlands. During the World Cup, Vorm's girlfriend Daisy delivered a son, Jaivy Waylon. The Dutch goalkeeper returned home for two days following his son's birth.

=== Euro 2012 ===
Vorm was included in the Netherlands squad for UEFA Euro 2012. Maarten Stekelenburg was Bert van Marwijk's first choice in goal, playing all three games as the nation exited in the group stage.

=== 2014 World Cup ===
For the 2014 FIFA World Cup, coach Louis van Gaal included Vorm in the Netherlands squad, alongside young Ajax goalkeeper Jasper Cillessen who was first choice in goal and Tim Krul. Despite having a reputation for his penalty-saving abilities while at Swansea, Van Gaal opted to replace Cillessen with Krul in the penalty shootout during the quarter-final match against Costa Rica. Vorm came on for Cillessen in injury time of the 3–0 third place play-off win against Brazil in Brasília, thus ensuring that all 23 Dutch squad members played at the tournament.

== Coaching career ==
On 20 April 2021, following the sacking of José Mourinho and the appointment of Ryan Mason on an interim basis, Vorm was appointed interim goalkeeping coach at Tottenham Hotspur. He left this position at the end of the season.

== Career statistics ==
=== Club ===
Appearances and goals by club, season and competition
Club	Season	League			National cup (Note: Includes KNVB Cup, FA Cup)		League cup (Note: Includes Football League Cup)		Europe		Other		Total	
Club	Season	Division	Apps	Goals	Apps	Goals	Apps	Goals	Apps	Goals	Apps	Goals	Apps	Goals
Utrecht	2006–07	Eredivisie	33	0	0	0	—		—		5 (Note: Appearances in Eredivisie European play-offs)	0	38	0
Utrecht	2007–08	Eredivisie	11	0	0	0	—		0	0	—		11	0
Utrecht	2008–09	Eredivisie	26	0	1	0	—		—		—		27	0
Utrecht	2009–10	Eredivisie	33	0	1	0	—		—		4	0	38	0
Utrecht	2010–11	Eredivisie	33	0	5	0	—		9 (Note: Appearances in UEFA Europa League)	0	—		47	0
Utrecht	2011–12	Eredivisie	1	0	0	0	—		—		—		1	0
Utrecht	Total		137	0	7	0	—		9	0	9	0	162	0
Den Bosch (loan)	2005–06	Eerste Divisie	35	0	0	0	—		—		—		35	0
Swansea City	2011–12	Premier League	37	0	0	0	0	0	—		—		37	0
Swansea City	2012–13	Premier League	26	0	2	0	0	0	—		—		28	0
Swansea City	2013–14	Premier League	26	0	0	0	0	0	6	0	—		32	0
Swansea City	Total		89	0	2	0	0	0	6	0	—		97	0
Tottenham Hotspur	2014–15	Premier League	4	0	3	0	5	0	2	0	—		14	0
Tottenham Hotspur	2015–16	Premier League	1	0	4	0	1	0	1	0	—		7	0
Tottenham Hotspur	2016–17	Premier League	5	0	4	0	2	0	0	0	—		11	0
Tottenham Hotspur	2017–18	Premier League	1	0	7	0	2	0	1 (Note: Appearance(s) in UEFA Champions League)	0	—		11	0
Tottenham Hotspur	2018–19	Premier League	2	0	0	0	0	0	2	0	—		4	0
Tottenham Hotspur	2019–20	Premier League	0	0	1	0	0	0	0	0	—		1	0
Tottenham Hotspur	Total		13	0	19	0	10	0	6	0	—		48	0
Career total			274	0	28	0	10	0	21	0	9	0	342	0

=== International ===
Netherlands
Year	Apps	Goals
2008	1	0
2009	2	0
2010	2	0
2011	4	0
2013	5	0
2014	1	0
Total	15	0

== Honours ==
Swansea City

- Football League Cup: 2012–13

Tottenham Hotspur

- Football League Cup runner-up: 2014–15
- UEFA Champions League runner-up: 2018–19

Netherlands

- FIFA World Cup runner-up: 2010; third place: 2014

Individual

- Swansea City Player of the Year: 2011–12
