= Wales at the UEFA European Championship =

International football delegation

As founder members of UEFA (the Union of European Football Associations), the governing body for all football in Europe, the Wales national football team has participated in all but one UEFA European Championship since it began as the European Nations' Cup in 1960. The tournament has been played every four years since then, with qualifying matches being played in the two years before each tournament.

Wales qualified for the finals in 2016 and 2020, and also progressed through qualifying to the quarter-finals in 1976, though this was played on a two-legged, home-and-away basis and is not considered part of the tournament proper. In 2016, Wales finished runner-up in their qualifying group, before going on to reach the semi-finals of the tournament, where they lost to eventual winners Portugal. In 2020, they also finished second in their qualifying group to secure automatic qualification for the finals, and again reached the knockout stage, but lost to Denmark in the round of 16.

== 1964 ==
Wales first entered the European Championship in 1964, when it was still known as the European Nations' Cup, having declined to participate in the 1960 tournament. Three of the 29 teams that entered – Austria, Luxembourg and the Soviet Union – received byes to the round of 16, while the other 26 teams competed in the two-legged preliminary round for the other 13 places. Wales were drawn against Hungary in their first competitive meeting since the group stage of the 1958 FIFA World Cup. The first leg was played in November 1962 and saw Hungary win 3–1 at Népstadion in Budapest; Flórián Albert opened the scoring in the fifth minute, before Terry Medwin equalised for Wales just under a quarter of an hour later, only for goals from Lajos Tichy in the 34th minute and Károly Sándor in the 48th to give Hungary the win. The second leg was played four months later at Ninian Park in Cardiff, and Wales got themselves back into the tie when Cliff Jones converted a penalty midway through the first half; however, Tichy equalised from the penalty spot in the 77th minute and Hungary won the tie 4–2 on aggregate.

== 1968 ==
The 1968 tournament, now known as the UEFA European Championship, saw 31 teams enter, divided into eight groups for the qualification process. With all four Home Nations entering for the first time, the already established British Home Championship served as one of the eight qualifying groups, combining the results from the 1966–67 and 1967–68 to determine which of the four would qualify for the quarter-finals. Wales began their campaign against Scotland at Ninian Park on 22 October 1966, but only managed a draw; Ron Davies opened the scoring in the 77th minute, only for Denis Law to equalise in the 86th. Wales then suffered a 5–1 defeat away to England on 16 November 1966; Wyn Davies pulled a goal back for Wales after Geoff Hurst had put England 2–0 up after 34 minutes, but goals from Bobby and Jack Charlton and an own goal by Terry Hennessey gave England the win. Wales' final game of the 1966–67 British Home Championship was away to Northern Ireland on 12 April 1967, but it finished as a 0–0 draw, which meant Wales went into the second half of the qualifying campaign in third place.

Wales began the 1967–68 British Home Championship with another heavy defeat to England on 21 October 1967; Martin Peters opened the scoring in the 34th minute, before late goals from Bobby Charlton and Alan Ball gave England a 3–0 win that left Wales needing to win both of their remaining matches to have a chance of qualifying for the next round. In the second match, away to Scotland on 22 November 1967, Alan Gilzean gave Scotland the lead in the 16th minute before Ron Davies equalised two minutes later. Alan Durban then put Wales in front in the 57th minute, only for Gilzean to pull Scotland level again eight minutes later, before Ronnie McKinnon gave Scotland the win 12 minutes from full-time, confirming Wales' elimination. Wales secured their only win of the campaign in their final match against Northern Ireland on 28 February 1968, when goals in the last 15 minutes of the match from Ronnie Rees and Wyn Davies gave them a 2–0 victory, which also meant they avoided finishing bottom of the group.

== 1972 ==
Although it continued to be played until 1984, the British Home Championship was not used as a qualifying group for UEFA Euro 1972; instead, the four Home Nations were all drawn into different groups. Wales were paired with Romania, Czechoslovakia and Finland in Group 1; it was their first meeting with Romania and Finland, and the first time they had been drawn with Czechoslovakia since qualifying for the 1958 World Cup. Wales' first game was against Romania at Ninian Park on 11 November 1970 and finished as a goalless draw. They then met Czechoslovakia at the Vetch Field in Swansea on 21 April 1971, where they took a 1–0 lead via a Ron Davies penalty early in the second half; however, two goals from Ján Čapkovič and another from Vladimír Táborský in the last 10 minutes gave Czechoslovakia a 3–1 win. Wales then met Finland at the Helsinki Olympic Stadium a month later, where John Toshack's goal in the 54th minute gave them their first win of the campaign.

Toshack scored again in the return fixture at the Vetch Field on 13 October 1971; Alan Durban and Gil Reece also scored to give Wales a 3–0 win and a chance at qualification if they could pick up away wins over Czechoslovakia and Romania in their final two games. However, a 1–0 win for Czechoslovakia in Prague on 27 October put Wales out of contention, and a 2–0 win for Romania in Bucharest on 24 November meant Wales finished the group in third place.

== 1976 ==
=== Qualifying ===
Wales were drawn in Group 2 in qualifying for UEFA Euro 1976, along with Hungary, Austria and Luxembourg; it was the first time they had met Austria or Luxembourg competitively, and their first meeting with Hungary since qualifying for the 1964 European Nations' Cup. Wales began their campaign away to Austria on 4 September 1974 and took the lead through Arfon Griffiths with 10 minutes left in the first half; however, Wilhelm Kreuz and Hans Krankl each scored in the second half to give Austria a 2–1 win. It was Wales' only defeat of their qualifying campaign. Wales responded with consecutive clean sheets against Hungary and Luxembourg; Griffiths and Toshack gave them a 2–0 win over Hungary at Ninian Park on 30 October, before doing so again at the Vetch Field against Luxembourg, where Mike England, Phil Roberts and Terry Yorath also contributed to make the final score 5–0.

Toshack scored his third goal in three games just before half-time in the return match against Hungary on 16 April 1975, before John Mahoney made it 2–0 in the 69th minute, although László Branikovits was able to pull a goal back for Hungary eight minutes later, the first goal Wales had conceded in 266 minutes of qualifying football. Two weeks later, Gil Reece and Leighton James again gave Wales a 2–0 first-half lead away to Luxembourg, only for Paul Philipp to pull a goal back for the home side with a penalty six minutes before half-time; however, James scored with another penalty in the 83rd minute to confirm a 3–1 win for Wales and set up a winner-takes-all match against Austria at the Racecourse Ground in Wrexham on the final matchday. Arfon Griffiths scored in the 69th minute to give Wales a 1–0 win and send them through to the quarter-finals.

=== Quarter-finals ===
In the quarter-finals, Wales were drawn against the winners of Group 3, Yugoslavia. In the first leg, they went behind to a goal from Momčilo Vukotić in the opening minute, before Danilo Popivoda made it 2–0 in the 57th. Josip Katalinski then gave Yugoslavia a 1–0 lead with a penalty in the 19th minute of the second leg at Ninian Park to essentially put the tie out of Wales' reach. Ian Evans pulled a goal back in the 38th minute, but with no further goals in the second half, Wales were eliminated.

== 1980 ==
UEFA Euro 1980 was the first European Championship to feature an eight-team final tournament. With Italy qualifying automatically as hosts, the 31 remaining participating nations were divided into seven groups, with only the winners qualifying for the finals. Wales were drawn into Group 7 with West Germany, Turkey and Malta. Despite being ordered by UEFA to play all their home matches at least 200 miles (320 km) from Cardiff due to crowd trouble in the quarter-final against Yugoslavia in 1976, they took an early lead in the group with victories over Malta (7–0) and Turkey (1–0) at the Racecourse Ground in October and November 1978. West Germany could only manage draws away to the same opponents in February and April 1979, and drew level on points with Wales with a 2–0 victory in Wrexham in May 1979. Wales pulled back ahead with a 2–0 win in Malta a month later, but a 5–1 loss to West Germany in October 1979 meant they would have to beat Turkey in their final match to keep their chances of qualification alive, with West Germany yet to play their return fixtures against Turkey and Malta. However, Turkey beat Wales 1–0 to overtake them at the top of the group. With West Germany winning both of their final games, Wales finished the group in third place on six points.

== 1984 ==
UEFA Euro 1984 followed the same qualification process as the 1980 tournament, with 32 participating teams again divided into seven groups. Wales were seeded in Pot 2 and drawn into Group 4 along with Yugoslavia, Bulgaria and Norway. Home wins over Norway and Bulgaria and draws away to Yugoslavia and Norway put Wales top of the group, a point ahead of Yugoslavia, ahead of the pair's last two matches. Wales lost 1–0 to Bulgaria in their penultimate match, which meant they would need to beat Yugoslavia in Cardiff in December 1983 to guarantee qualification. Robbie James opened the scoring for Wales early in the second half, but Mehmed Baždarević's equaliser with less than 10 minutes to go meant the match finished 1–1. A draw between Yugoslavia and Bulgaria (or a one-goal win for Bulgaria) in the final group match would send Wales to the finals, and the score was 2–2 as the match entered injury time at the end of the second half; however, a header from Ljubomir Radanović gave Yugoslavia the win and sent them to the finals in Wales' place.

== 1988 ==
Qualifying for UEFA Euro 1988 again followed the same process as the last two tournaments, with the 32 participating teams drawn into seven groups, and the winners joining hosts West Germany in the finals. Wales were again seeded in Pot 2, and drawn into Group 6 with Denmark, Czechoslovakia and Finland. As they had done four years earlier, Wales went unbeaten in their first four matches, with draws away to Finland and at home to Czechoslovakia, and home wins over Finland and Denmark; that put them top of the group, ahead of Denmark on goal difference ahead of the two sides' decisive match in Copenhagen in October 1987. Victory for Wales would have sent them to the finals, but Preben Elkjær gave Denmark a 1–0 win, which left Wales needing to beat Czechoslovakia in the final group match to retake top spot; however, goals from Ivo Knoflíček and Michal Bílek gave Czechoslovakia a 2–0 win and Wales finished in third place.

== 1992 ==
The same qualification process was followed for a fourth tournament in a row for UEFA Euro 1992, with 34 teams drawn into seven groups, the winners of which would join hosts Sweden in the finals. Wales were seeded in Pot 4 and were drawn into Group 5 with both West and East Germany, Belgium and Luxembourg. Following the German reunification in October 1990, all of East Germany's matches were scratched and the reunified nation continued in place of West Germany, who had won the World Cup earlier in the year. Wales again made a strong start to their qualifying group, with three wins and a draw in their first four matches, including an historic 1–0 win over Germany in Cardiff in June 1991, the only goal scored by Ian Rush. Despite losing 4–1 in the return match against Germany, a 1–0 win over Luxembourg in their final match put Wales on top of the group, three points ahead of Germany, albeit with Germany having two games left to play. That meant if Germany lost to either Belgium or Luxembourg, Wales would qualify for the finals; however, Germany managed to win both matches and finished a point ahead of Wales to qualify.

== 1996 ==
UEFA Euro 1996 featured an expanded tournament, with 15 teams qualifying for the finals alongside host nation England. Following the break-up of the Soviet Union, Yugoslavia and Czechoslovakia, a record 47 teams participated in qualifying, drawn into eight groups (seven groups of six teams and one of five). The winners of each group qualified automatically, along with the six best runners-up, while the other two would contest a play-off for the remaining place in the finals. Wales were seeded in Pot 2 and drawn into Group 7 with Germany, Bulgaria, Georgia, Albania and Moldova. Wales' qualifying campaign began with a 2–0 win at home to Albania, but consecutive defeats to Moldova, Georgia and both home and away to Bulgaria put Wales second-bottom at the halfway stage, only ahead of Albania by virtue of their victory in the opening match. A surprise draw away to Germany in April 1995 gave Wales a little hope, but they only managed one more win in the group – at home to Moldova in September 1995 – and following home defeats to Georgia and Germany, it was only a draw away to Albania in November 1995 that kept Wales from finishing bottom.

== 2000 ==
Qualifying for UEFA Euro 2000 saw a new record of 49 teams divided into nine groups; with Belgium and the Netherlands qualifying automatically as hosts, the nine group winners and the best runner-up qualified automatically, while the other eight runners-up went into play-offs for the four remaining spots in the finals. Wales were seeded in Pot 4 and drawn into Group 1 along with Italy, Denmark, Switzerland and Belarus. Despite an opening defeat at home to Italy (played at Anfield in Liverpool due to the ongoing construction of the Millennium Stadium), wins away to Denmark and at home to Belarus put Wales in second place going into their fourth match against Switzerland; however, consecutive defeats away to Switzerland and Italy, and at home to Denmark saw Wales drop to fourth place and out of contention to win the group. An away win over Belarus meant finishing as runners-up was still possible with one match left, but Denmark's comeback win over Italy on the penultimate matchday ended that prospect, and defeat to Switzerland in their final match meant Wales finished in fourth place.

== 2004 ==
The UEFA Euro 2004 qualification process featured yet another record number of teams, as the 50 participating nations were divided into 10 groups of five teams each; the winners would qualify automatically for the finals in Portugal, while the 10 runners-up would contest two-legged play-offs for the five remaining places. Wales were again seeded in the fourth of the five draw pots, and were assigned to Group 9 with Italy, FR Yugoslavia (renamed Serbia and Montenegro in February 2003), Finland and Azerbaijan. Wales won each of their first four matches, including an historic 2–1 victory at home to Italy in October 2002. Wales picked up just one point from their last four matches – a 1–1 draw at home to Finland – which saw them lose out on winning the group, but it was enough for a runners-up spot and a place in the play-offs.

There was no seeding for the play-off draw, which saw Wales paired with Russia, the runners-up of Group 10. Wales managed to hold Russia to a goalless draw in the first leg in Moscow, but a goal from Vadim Evseev gave Russia a 1–0 win in Cardiff, prolonging Wales' wait to qualify for a first major tournament since the 1958 World Cup. It was later revealed that Russia midfielder Yegor Titov had tested positive for the banned substance bromantane after the first leg, for which he had been an unused substitute, and was given a one-year suspension from football. Wales appealed against the result of the second leg, of which Titov played almost an hour, arguing that they should be awarded a 3–0 win because Russia fielded an ineligible player, but their initial case was denied as they were unable to prove Titov was under the influence of bromantane when he played in the match. After their appeal was turned down by both UEFA and the Court of Arbitration for Sport, Wales' bid to reach Euro 2004 came to an end.

== 2008 ==
UEFA Euro 2008 was co-hosted by Austria and Switzerland, which meant the 50 teams participating in qualifying were split into seven groups (six of seven teams, one of eight), from which the top two teams would qualify for the finals. Wales were seeded in Pot 5 and drawn into Group D with the Czech Republic, Germany, Slovakia, the Republic of Ireland, Cyprus and San Marino. After defeats to the Czech Republic and Slovakia in their first two matches, Wales responded with a 3–1 win at home to Cyprus, only to lose 1–0 to the Republic of Ireland in their next match. A 3–0 win over San Marino and a goalless draw with the Czech Republic, both at home, followed, before a 2–0 home defeat to Germany. In their next game, Wales beat Slovakia 5–2 away from home, their first away win for almost two years and the first time they had scored five goals in an away match for 11 years; however, they were unable to follow it up, losing 3–1 in Cyprus in October 2007. Wales did go unbeaten in their final three matches – beating San Marino 2–1 before draws with the Republic of Ireland (2–2) and Germany (0–0) – but it was not enough for a qualification spot, ultimately finishing in fifth place on 15 points, 12 behind second-placed Germany.

== 2012 ==
Qualifying for UEFA Euro 2012, jointly hosted by Poland and Ukraine, saw the 51 participating nations divided into nine groups (six of six teams and three of five), with the winners of each group and the best runner-up qualifying for the finals automatically, while the eight other runners-up contested play-offs for the four remaining spots. Wales were seeded in Pot 4 and drawn into Group G along with England, Switzerland, Bulgaria and Montenegro. Wales lost each of their first four matches, their first victory coming at home to Montenegro in September 2011. That was the first of three victories they achieved in the group, the other two – at home to Switzerland and away to Bulgaria, their first back-to-back competitive wins for six years – coming after a second defeat to England. Those results meant Wales finished with the same number of wins as second-placed Montenegro, but fewer draws left them three points outside the play-off position.

== 2016 ==
=== Qualifying ===
In qualifying for Euro 2016, Wales were placed in the fourth of six seeding pots, along with Montenegro, Armenia, Scotland, Finland, Latvia, Bulgaria, Estonia and Belarus. They were drawn into Group B with Bosnia & Herzegovina, Belgium, Israel, Cyprus and Andorra.

Wales began their campaign in September 2014 with an away game against Andorra, and went behind to a penalty kick in the sixth minute; however, Gareth Bale equalised midway through the first half before scoring from a free kick with only a minute left in the game to give Wales their first three points. A double-header in Cardiff followed in October 2014; first, a 0–0 draw with Bosnia & Herzegovina, followed by a 2–1 win over Cyprus. Goals from David Cotterill and Hal Robson-Kanu gave them the lead, only for Cyprus to pull one back; however, Wales were able to hang on for the win despite Andy King being sent off early in the second half. Another goalless draw came away to Belgium in November 2014, leaving Wales in second place behind Israel – who were yet to drop a point – at the end of the year.

Wales' first game of 2015 saw them travel to the group leaders in March, with Bale setting up Aaron Ramsey before scoring another two goals himself in a 3–0 win to take top spot. On the occasion of his 50th international appearance, Bale then scored his fifth goal of qualifying back in Cardiff in June 2015, giving Wales a 1–0 win over Belgium, who had gone top of the group with victory over Israel in March and were on an unbeaten run stretching back to the 2014 FIFA World Cup. Bale again scored the only goal of the game in Wales' next match away to Cyprus in September 2015, but their first chance to assure qualification was missed at home to Israel, as the visitors' defence neutralised Bale and Simon Church had a goal disallowed for offside in injury time at the end of the game.

Losing 2–0 away to Bosnia & Herzegovina in October 2015, Wales' first defeat of the campaign, allowed Belgium to move into top spot in the group, but Israel's loss to Cyprus meant Wales had qualified for their first European Championship and their first major tournament since the 1958 World Cup. Despite the defeat, the nation celebrated and a 2–0 win over Andorra three days later, with goals from Ramsey and Bale, was followed by a party atmosphere at the Cardiff City Stadium. Bale finished with seven goals, joint for the sixth most in qualifying.

==== Standings ====
Pos	Team	Pld	W	D	L	GF	GA	GD	Pts	Qualification	(Belgium)	(Wales)	(Bosnia and Herzegovina)	(Israel)	(Cyprus)	(Andorra)
1	Belgium	10	7	2	1	24	5	+19	23	Qualify for final tournament	—	0–0	3–1	3–1	5–0	6–0
2	Wales	10	6	3	1	11	4	+7	21	Qualify for final tournament	1–0	—	0–0	0–0	2–1	2–0
3	Bosnia and Herzegovina	10	5	2	3	17	12	+5	17	Advance to play-offs	1–1	2–0	—	3–1	1–2	3–0
4	Israel	10	4	1	5	16	14	+2	13		0–1	0–3	3–0	—	1–2	4–0
5	Cyprus	10	4	0	6	16	17	−1	12		0–1	0–1	2–3	1–2	—	5–0
6	Andorra	10	0	0	10	4	36	−32	0		1–4	1–2	0–3	1–4	1–3	—

Source: UEFA
Rules for classification: Qualification tiebreakers

=== Finals ===
==== Squad ====
Wales named an initial squad of 29 players on 9 May 2016 for a training camp in Portugal ahead of travelling to France for the finals; Gareth Bale was left out due to Real Madrid's involvement in the 2016 UEFA Champions League Final. Defender Adam Henley and forward Tom Bradshaw left the camp early due to injuries, before the final squad of 23 was announced on 31 May. Bale was included but was a fitness concern after suffering cramp in the Champions League final, while Joe Ledley was also included less than a month after breaking his leg. There were also issues relating to the fitness of striker Hal Robson-Kanu and midfielder Joe Allen. Adam Matthews, Paul Dummett, Emyr Huws and Wes Burns were cut.

No.	Pos.	Player	Date of birth (age)	Caps	Goals	Club
1	GK	Wayne Hennessey	24 January 1987 (aged 29)	57	0	(The Football Association) Crystal Palace
2	DF	Chris Gunter	21 July 1989 (aged 26)	67	0	(The Football Association) Reading
3	DF	Neil Taylor	7 February 1989 (aged 27)	28	0	(Football Association of Wales) Swansea City
4	DF	Ben Davies	24 April 1993 (aged 23)	20	0	(The Football Association) Tottenham Hotspur
5	DF	James Chester	23 January 1989 (aged 27)	11	0	(The Football Association) West Bromwich Albion
6	DF	Ashley Williams (captain)	23 August 1984 (aged 31)	59	1	(Football Association of Wales) Swansea City
7	MF	Joe Allen	14 March 1990 (aged 26)	25	0	(The Football Association) Liverpool
8	MF	Andy King	29 October 1988 (aged 27)	33	2	(The Football Association) Leicester City
9	FW	Hal Robson-Kanu	21 May 1989 (aged 27)	30	2	(The Football Association) Reading
10	MF	Aaron Ramsey	26 December 1990 (aged 25)	39	10	(The Football Association) Arsenal
11	FW	Gareth Bale	16 July 1989 (aged 26)	55	19	(Royal Spanish Football Federation) Real Madrid
12	GK	Owain Fôn Williams	17 March 1987 (aged 29)	1	0	(Scottish Football Association) Inverness Caledonian Thistle
13	FW	George Williams	7 September 1995 (aged 20)	7	0	(The Football Association) Gillingham
14	MF	David Edwards	3 February 1986 (aged 30)	32	3	(The Football Association) Wolverhampton Wanderers
15	DF	Jazz Richards	12 April 1991 (aged 25)	9	0	(The Football Association) Fulham
16	MF	Joe Ledley	23 January 1987 (aged 29)	61	4	(The Football Association) Crystal Palace
17	FW	David Cotterill	4 December 1987 (aged 28)	23	2	(The Football Association) Birmingham City
18	FW	Sam Vokes	21 October 1989 (aged 26)	40	6	(The Football Association) Burnley
19	DF	James Collins	23 August 1983 (aged 32)	47	3	(The Football Association) West Ham United
20	MF	Jonny Williams	9 October 1993 (aged 22)	12	0	(The Football Association) Milton Keynes Dons
21	GK	Danny Ward	22 June 1993 (aged 22)	2	0	(The Football Association) Liverpool
22	MF	David Vaughan	18 February 1983 (aged 33)	42	1	(The Football Association) Nottingham Forest
23	FW	Simon Church	10 December 1988 (aged 27)	36	3	(Scottish Football Association) Aberdeen

==== Group stage ====
Finishing in second place in their qualifying group meant Wales avoided having to go through a play-off to reach Euro 2016, but due to their UEFA coefficient, they were placed in the fourth and final pot for the finals draw in December 2015, along with Turkey, the Republic of Ireland, Iceland, Albania and Northern Ireland. The draw saw Wales paired with England, Russia and Slovakia in Group B.

In their first appearance at a major tournament for 58 years, Wales played their first match of the finals on 11 June 2016, coming up against Slovakia in Bordeaux. Bale opened the scoring with a direct free kick in the 10th minute, and Wales held the lead until 16 minutes into the second half, when Ondrej Duda equalised for the Slovaks; however, Hal Robson-Kanu's goal nine minutes from the end secured the three points for Wales, who went top of the group after the first round of matches. The second game on 16 June saw Wales play England in Lens; again, Bale opened the scoring from a free kick just before half-time, but a goal from Jamie Vardy 10 minutes into the second half and an injury-time winner from Daniel Sturridge saw England move a point ahead of Wales at the top of the group. With places in the round of 16 going not only to the top two in each group but also to the four best third-place finishers, Wales needed only to avoid defeat to Russia in their final group match in Toulouse on 20 June; however, they were not content to settle for just a point, and ultimately ran out as 3–0 winners. Aaron Ramsey opened the scoring with a chip over Russian goalkeeper Igor Akinfeev in the 11th minute, followed by a first international goal for left-back Neil Taylor nine minutes later, before Bale added the third midway through the second half. Combined with England's goalless draw with Slovakia, the result meant Wales finished as group winners, and would play against Northern Ireland in the round of 16.

Pos	Team	Pld	W	D	L	GF	GA	GD	Pts	Qualification
1	Wales	3	2	0	1	6	3	+3	6	Advance to knockout stage
2	England	3	1	2	0	3	2	+1	5	Advance to knockout stage
3	Slovakia	3	1	1	1	3	3	0	4	Advance to knockout stage
4	Russia	3	0	1	2	2	6	−4	1	

Source: UEFA
Rules for classification: Group stage tiebreakers
11 June 2016
18:00

Wales	2–1	Slovakia
Bale 10'; Robson-Kanu 81'	Report	Duda 61'

Stade de Bordeaux, Bordeaux
Attendance: 37,831
Referee: Svein Oddvar Moen (Norway)

16 June 2016
15:00

England	2–1	Wales
Vardy 56'; Sturridge 90+2'	Report	Bale 42'

Stade Bollaert-Delelis, Lens
Attendance: 34,033
Referee: Felix Brych (Germany)

20 June 2016
21:00

Russia	0–3	Wales
	Report	Ramsey 11'; Taylor 20'; Bale 67'

Stadium Municipal, Toulouse
Attendance: 28,840
Referee: Jonas Eriksson (Sweden)

==== Knockout stage ====
As the winners of Group B, the combination of best third-placed teams meant Wales played against the third-placed team from Group C, Northern Ireland, in the round of 16. The match was played in Paris on 25 June, with Wales winning 1–0 thanks to an own goal from Northern Ireland defender Gareth McAuley as he attempted to clear a low cross from Bale. In the quarter-finals, Wales came up against their opponents from qualifying, Belgium, in Lille on 1 July, and went behind after less than 15 minutes, thanks to a long-range strike from Radja Nainggolan; however, just after the half-hour mark, captain Ashley Williams scored with a header from a Ramsey corner, and 10 minutes into the second half, Robson-Kanu made space in the Belgium penalty area with a Cruyff Turn to beat three defenders before finishing past Thibaut Courtois. Then, with less than five minutes to play, Sam Vokes headed home a cross from Chris Gunter to make it 3–1 to Wales and send them into their first ever semi-final of a major tournament. However, they were unable to get over the last hurdle and reach the final, losing 2–0 to Portugal in Lyon on 6 July, a quick-fire double from Cristiano Ronaldo and Nani proving the difference between the two sides.

Round of 16

25 June 2016
18:00

Wales	1–0	Northern Ireland
McAuley 75' (o.g.)	Report

Parc des Princes, Paris
Attendance: 44,342
Referee: Martin Atkinson (England)

Quarter-finals

1 July 2016
21:00

Wales	3–1	Belgium
A. Williams 31'; Robson-Kanu 55'; Vokes 86'	Report	Nainggolan 13'

Stade Pierre-Mauroy, Villeneuve-d'Ascq
Attendance: 45,936
Referee: Damir Skomina (Slovenia)

Semi-finals

6 July 2016
21:00

Portugal	2–0	Wales
Ronaldo 50'; Nani 53'	Report

Parc Olympique Lyonnais, Décines-Charpieu
Attendance: 55,679
Referee: Jonas Eriksson (Sweden)

== 2020 ==
=== Qualifying ===
Wales' run to the semi-finals of Euro 2016 and subsequent good form meant they were placed in Pot 2 for the UEFA Euro 2020 qualifying draw, along with Germany, Iceland, Bosnia & Herzegovina, Ukraine, Denmark, Sweden, Russia, Austria and the Czech Republic. They were drawn into Group E with Croatia, Slovakia, Hungary and Azerbaijan. The top two teams from each of the 10 groups qualified automatically for the finals, while the final four places were decided by play-offs based on the teams' performance in the 2018–19 UEFA Nations League.

Wales had a bye in the first round of matches, due to being in a five-team group, so their first fixture was at home to Slovakia on the second matchday, on 24 March 2019. Five minutes into his first competitive start for Wales, Daniel James scored the only goal of the game to give Wales their first three points of the campaign. They had two away fixtures in June 2019, against Croatia and Hungary. In the first match, on 8 June, James Lawrence diverted a cross from Croatia's Ivan Perišić into his own net, before Perišić put the home side 2–0 up just after half-time; David Brooks pulled a goal back for Wales, but they were unable to find an equaliser. Three days later in Budapest, Máté Pátkai scored the only goal of the game in the 80th minute to give Hungary the victory. In September 2019, Wales again had just one match, at home to Azerbaijan, and they took the lead in the 26th minute through an own goal from Pavel Pashayev. Mahir Emreli equalised for the visitors in the 59th minute, but Gareth Bale gave Wales the win with his first goal of the campaign six minutes from full time.

October's fixtures began with a trip to Trnava to take on Slovakia, where Kieffer Moore gave Wales the lead in the 25th minute with his first international goal, only for Juraj Kucka to salvage a point for the hosts with a goal early in the second half. Three days later, Wales hosted Croatia and went behind to an early goal from Nikola Vlašić; Bale equalised in the third minute of first-half stoppage time, but the second half went goalless and the match finished 1–1. That meant Wales went into the final two matches on eight points, four behind second-placed Hungary, and needing to win both to have a chance of qualifying automatically. The first match was away against Azerbaijan on 16 November, where Wales managed a 2–0 win thanks to Moore and Harry Wilson. A place in the play-offs was already assured, but following Slovakia's 3–1 loss to Croatia, victory at home to Hungary in the final game on 19 November would assure automatic qualification. Making his first international start for just over a year, Aaron Ramsey opened the scoring with less than a quarter of an hour played, before doubling Wales' lead just after half-time. The rest of the game went goalless and Wales won 2–0 to secure qualification for their second consecutive European Championship.

==== Standings ====
Pos	Team	Pld	W	D	L	GF	GA	GD	Pts	Qualification	(Croatia)	(Wales)	(Slovakia)	(Hungary)	(Azerbaijan)
1	Croatia	8	5	2	1	17	7	+10	17	Qualify for final tournament	—	2–1	3–1	3–0	2–1
2	Wales	8	4	2	2	10	6	+4	14	Qualify for final tournament	1–1	—	1–0	2–0	2–1
3	Slovakia	8	4	1	3	13	11	+2	13	Advance to play-offs via Nations League	0–4	1–1	—	2–0	2–0
4	Hungary	8	4	0	4	8	11	−3	12	Advance to play-offs via Nations League	2–1	1–0	1–2	—	1–0
5	Azerbaijan	8	0	1	7	5	18	−13	1		1–1	0–2	1–5	1–3	—

Source: UEFA
Rules for classification: Qualification tiebreakers

=== Finals ===
==== Squad ====
Wales announced on 23 April 2021 that Rob Page would serve as manager for the tournament, after regular manager Ryan Giggs was charged by the Crown Prosecution Service. The team announced a 28-man preliminary squad on 24 May. The final squad was announced on 30 May. James Lawrence withdrew injured and was replaced by Tom Lockyer on 31 May.

No.	Pos.	Player	Date of birth (age)	Caps	Goals	Club
1	GK	Wayne Hennessey	24 January 1987 (aged 34)	96	0	(The Football Association) Crystal Palace
2	DF	Chris Gunter	21 July 1989 (aged 31)	101	0	(The Football Association) Charlton Athletic
3	DF	Neco Williams	13 April 2001 (aged 20)	11	1	(The Football Association) Liverpool
4	DF	Ben Davies	24 April 1993 (aged 28)	60	0	(The Football Association) Tottenham Hotspur
5	DF	Tom Lockyer	3 December 1994 (aged 26)	13	0	(The Football Association) Luton Town
6	DF	Joe Rodon	22 October 1997 (aged 23)	14	0	(The Football Association) Tottenham Hotspur
7	MF	Joe Allen	14 March 1990 (aged 31)	59	2	(The Football Association) Stoke City
8	MF	Harry Wilson	22 March 1997 (aged 24)	26	5	(Football Association of Wales) Cardiff City
9	FW	Tyler Roberts	12 January 1999 (aged 22)	14	0	(The Football Association) Leeds United
10	MF	Aaron Ramsey	26 December 1990 (aged 30)	63	16	(Italian Football Federation) Juventus
11	FW	Gareth Bale (captain)	16 July 1989 (aged 31)	92	33	(The Football Association) Tottenham Hotspur
12	GK	Danny Ward	22 June 1993 (aged 27)	13	0	(The Football Association) Leicester City
13	FW	Kieffer Moore	8 August 1992 (aged 28)	17	5	(Football Association of Wales) Cardiff City
14	DF	Connor Roberts	23 September 1995 (aged 25)	26	1	(Football Association of Wales) Swansea City
15	DF	Ethan Ampadu	14 September 2000 (aged 20)	23	0	(The Football Association) Sheffield United
16	MF	Joe Morrell	3 January 1997 (aged 24)	15	0	(The Football Association) Luton Town
17	DF	Rhys Norrington-Davies	22 April 1999 (aged 22)	5	0	(The Football Association) Stoke City
18	MF	Jonny Williams	9 October 1993 (aged 27)	28	1	(Football Association of Wales) Cardiff City
19	MF	David Brooks	8 July 1997 (aged 23)	18	2	(The Football Association) Bournemouth
20	MF	Daniel James	10 November 1997 (aged 23)	20	4	(The Football Association) Manchester United
21	GK	Adam Davies	17 July 1992 (aged 28)	2	0	(The Football Association) Stoke City
22	DF	Chris Mepham	5 November 1997 (aged 23)	18	0	(The Football Association) Bournemouth
23	MF	Dylan Levitt	17 November 2000 (aged 20)	8	0	(Croatian Football Federation) Istra 1961
24	DF	Ben Cabango	30 May 2000 (aged 21)	3	0	(Football Association of Wales) Swansea City
25	MF	Rubin Colwill	27 April 2002 (aged 19)	1	0	(Football Association of Wales) Cardiff City
26	MF	Matthew Smith	22 November 1999 (aged 21)	14	0	(The Football Association) Doncaster Rovers

==== Group stage ====
As in 2016, Wales' second-place finish in their qualifying group meant they avoided a play-off to reach Euro 2020; however, their UEFA coefficient meant they were again placed in Pot 4 for the finals draw in November 2019, along with Finland and the four play-off winners. Wales were placed in Group A along with host nation Italy, as well as Switzerland and Turkey.

Wales' schedule saw them given two games in the Azerbaijani capital of Baku, which they made their team base for the tournament. Due to the spread of COVID-19, which was declared a pandemic in March 2020, the tournament was ultimately delayed by a year to June and July 2021. Wales played their first game against Switzerland in Baku on 12 June 2021; Breel Embolo opened the scoring for Switzerland early in the second half, but Kieffer Moore equalised for Wales with a header from a corner with just over 15 minutes to play. Mario Gavranović had the ball in the back of the net for Switzerland late on, but the goal was ruled out by the video assistant referee (VAR), in use for the first time at a European Championship, and the match finished 1–1. At the same venue four days later, they took on Turkey, who had lost 3–0 to Italy in the tournament's opening game. Aaron Ramsey gave Wales the lead just before half-time, when he beat the offside trap to collect a lobbed pass from Bale before rolling the ball past goalkeeper Uğurcan Çakır. Bale had a chance to put Wales 2–0 up on the hour mark, when he was fouled in the penalty area, but he shot over the bar from the resulting penalty kick; however, right-back Connor Roberts did make it 2–0 in the fifth minute of injury time at the end of the game, following a short corner routine involving Wilson and Bale.

The win put Wales in second place in the group, and their advantage of three points and five goals over third-placed Switzerland meant they could afford a loss to Italy in the third match and still qualify. Italy were unbeaten in their last 29 games ahead of their meeting with Wales and had scored three goals in each of their first two matches at Euro 2020, having never previously done so at a European Championship, and took the lead just over five minutes before half-time, when Matteo Pessina turned home a free kick from Marco Verratti. Wales midfielder Ethan Ampadu was sent off for a foul on Federico Bernardeschi 10 minutes into the second half, but Italy were unable to make the numerical advantage count and the game finished 1–0. Meanwhile, Switzerland only managed a 3–1 win over Turkey, which meant Wales held onto second place in the group despite the defeat.

Pos	Team	Pld	W	D	L	GF	GA	GD	Pts	Qualification
1	Italy (H)	3	3	0	0	7	0	+7	9	Advance to knockout stage
2	Wales	3	1	1	1	3	2	+1	4 (Note: Tied on head-to-head result (Wales 1–1 Switzerland). Overall goal difference was used as the tiebreaker.)	Advance to knockout stage
3	Switzerland	3	1	1	1	4	5	−1	4	Advance to knockout stage
4	Turkey	3	0	0	3	1	8	−7	0	

Source: UEFA
Rules for classification: Group stage tiebreakers
(H) Hosts
Notes:
12 June 2021
15:00 (17:00 UTC+4)

Wales	1–1	Switzerland
Moore 74'	Report	Embolo 49'

Olympic Stadium, Baku
Attendance: 8,782
Referee: Clément Turpin (France)

16 June 2021
18:00 (20:00 UTC+4)

Turkey	0–2	Wales
	Report	Ramsey 42'; C. Roberts 90+5'

Olympic Stadium, Baku
Attendance: 19,762
Referee: Artur Soares Dias (Portugal)

20 June 2021
18:00

Italy	1–0	Wales
Pessina 39'	Report

Stadio Olimpico, Rome
Attendance: 11,541
Referee: Ovidiu Hațegan (Romania)

==== Knockout stage ====
As the runners-up of Group A, Wales were paired with the runners-up of Group B, Denmark, in the round of 16. The match was played in Amsterdam on 26 June; Kasper Dolberg put Denmark 1–0 up in the 27th minute, before doubling their lead just after half-time. Joakim Mæhle scored Denmark's third in the 88th minute, before being fouled by Harry Wilson in the 90th, which resulted in a red card for the Wales midfielder. Martin Braithwaite scored Denmark's fourth in the 94th minute to seal Wales' elimination from the tournament.

Round of 16

26 June 2021
18:00

Wales	0–4	Denmark
	Report	Dolberg 27', 48'; Mæhle 88'; Braithwaite 90+4'

Johan Cruyff Arena, Amsterdam
Attendance: 14,645
Referee: Daniel Siebert (Germany)

== 2024 ==
=== Qualifying ===
Having reached the knockout stage of the last two European Championships, Wales were seeded in pot 2 for the UEFA Euro 2024 qualifying draw, along with France, Austria, the Czech Republic, England, Israel, Bosnia & Herzegovina, Serbia, Scotland and Finland. Wales were drawn into Group D along with Croatia, Armenia, Turkey and Latvia.

The qualifying process began in March 2023, when Wales travelled to Split to play Croatia. Andrej Kramarić opened the scoring in the first half-hour, but Croatia were unable to kill the game off, and in the third minute of second-half injury time, Nathan Broadhead scored the equaliser on his Wales debut. Three days later, Wales beat Latvia 1–0 thanks to a goal from Kieffer Moore shortly before half-time. In June 2023, Wales first faced Armenia in Cardiff and took an early lead through Daniel James; however, Lucas Zelarayán volleyed in an equaliser shortly afterwards, before Grant-Leon Ranos headed the visitors in front on the half-hour mark. Ranos gave Armenia a two-goal lead 20 minutes into the second half, but Harry Wilson pulled one back for Wales six minutes later, only for Zelarayán to put Armenia 4–2 up with 15 minutes to go, sealing a surprise victory. Moore was sent off three minutes later for kicking out after grappling with Armenia goalkeeper Ognjen Čančarević, which ruled him out of the game against Turkey on 19 June. Wales suffered another red card in the first half of their game against Turkey, as Joe Morrell was sent off for a high tackle on Ferdi Kadıoğlu. They had had a reprieve in the opening 10 minutes, when Chris Mepham's own goal was ruled out for offside, but in the second half, Turkey's numerical advantage told; although Danny Ward was equal to Hakan Çalhanoğlu's 64th-minute penalty, he could only get a hand to Umut Nayir's opener less than 10 minutes later, and he was powerless to stop Arda Güler's long-range effort that made it 2–0 with 10 minutes to go. That result left Wales second-bottom of the group after four matches with just four points.

Due to playing in a five-team group, Wales played just one qualifier in September 2023, travelling to Latvia. Armenia's surprise 1–1 draw with Turkey on 8 September meant a win for Wales would pull them to within three points of the automatic qualification spots, and Aaron Ramsey put them 1–0 up with a penalty just before the half-hour mark. Both sides had chances after that, but victory was secured in the sixth minute of second-half injury time, when David Brooks chipped the ball over an onrushing Roberts Ozols. They again had just one qualifier in October, when they hosted Croatia. After going close with a free kick in the first half, Harry Wilson scored twice in the first 15 minutes of the second to open up a comfortable lead. Mario Pašalić pulled one back for Croatia with 15 minutes to go, but Wales held on for the win, putting them into the top two with two games to go. November's double-header saw them travel to Armenia before returning to Cardiff for the final game at home to Turkey. In Yerevan, Zelarayán was again on the scoresheet for Armenia, putting the home side 1–0 up in the opening five minutes. Wales levelled at the end of the first half thanks to an own goal from Nair Tiknizyan following a long throw by Connor Roberts, but they were unable to find a winner, leaving their fate out of their hands going into the final game. As well as needing to beat Turkey, Wales also required Croatia to drop points at home to Armenia. Neco Williams gave Wales a good start, putting them 1–0 up in the seventh minute, but they were unable to take advantage of further chances, and Yusuf Yazıcı's penalty after Ben Davies' push on Kenan Yıldız ultimately consigned Wales to a third-place finish in the group and a place in the play-offs.

==== Standings ====
Pos	Team	Pld	W	D	L	GF	GA	GD	Pts	Qualification	(Turkey)	(Croatia)	(Wales)	(Armenia)	(Latvia)
1	Turkey	8	5	2	1	14	7	+7	17	Qualify for final tournament	—	0–2	2–0	1–1	4–0
2	Croatia	8	5	1	2	13	4	+9	16	Qualify for final tournament	0–1	—	1–1	1–0	5–0
3	Wales	8	3	3	2	10	10	0	12	Advance to play-offs via Nations League	1–1	2–1	—	2–4	1–0
4	Armenia	8	2	2	4	9	11	−2	8		1–2	0–1	1–1	—	2–1
5	Latvia	8	1	0	7	5	19	−14	3		2–3	0–2	0–2	2–0	—

Source: UEFA
Rules for classification: Qualification tiebreakers

=== Play-offs ===
The draw for the play-offs took place on 23 November 2023. By virtue of their ranking in the 2022–23 UEFA Nations League, Wales were placed into Path A, along with Poland, Estonia, and one of Finland, Israel and Ukraine. Finland were the last team drawn, which meant they were paired with Wales in the Path A semi-final, to be played on 21 March 2024, the winners of which would host the final five days later.

David Brooks opened the scoring for Wales inside three minutes against Finland. Neco Williams doubled their lead with a free kick in the 37th minute, but Teemu Pukki pulled a goal back for the visitors on the stroke of half-time. Brennan Johnson restored Wales's two-goal lead from a corner just after the break, and Daniel James capitalised on a defensive error to round the goalkeeper and complete the scoring in the 86th minute, setting up a final against Poland, who beat Estonia 5–1 in the other semi-final. The final was goalless through 90 minutes, as Ben Davies had a goal ruled out for offside, while Chris Mepham was sent off for a second bookable offence in the 121st minute as the match went to penalties. Both teams were successful with their first four kicks, before Krzysztof Piątek gave Poland a 5–4 lead with their fifth attempt; however, Daniel James saw his kick saved by Wojciech Szczęsny and Wales were eliminated.

==== Bracket ====
Semi-finals
21 March 2024 – Cardiff
Wales	4
Finland	1
21 March 2024 – Warsaw
Poland	5
Estonia	1

Final
26 March 2024 – Cardiff
Wales	0 (4)
Poland (p)	0 (5)

== Overall record ==
UEFA European Championship record									Qualification record						Qualification play-offs record					
Year	Round	Position	Pld	W	D*	L	GF	GA	Pld	W	D	L	GF	GA	Pld	W	D	L	GF	GA
(France) 1960	Did not enter								Did not enter						—N/a					
(Spain) 1964	Did not qualify								2	0	1	1	2	4	—N/a					
(Italy) 1968	Did not qualify								6	1	2	3	6	12	—N/a					
(Belgium) 1972	Did not qualify								6	2	1	3	5	6	—N/a					
(Socialist Federal Republic of Yugoslavia) 1976 (Note: Wales progressed through UEFA Euro 1976 qualifying to the quarter-finals, though this was played on a two-legged, home-and-away basis and is not considered part of the finals tournament.)	Did not qualify								8	5	1	2	15	7	2	0	1	1	1	3
(Italy) 1980	Did not qualify								6	3	0	3	11	8	—N/a					
(France) 1984	Did not qualify								6	2	3	1	7	6	—N/a					
(West Germany) 1988	Did not qualify								6	2	2	2	7	5	—N/a					
(Sweden) 1992	Did not qualify								6	4	1	1	8	6	—N/a					
(England) 1996	Did not qualify								10	2	2	6	9	19	—N/a					
(Belgium) (Netherlands) 2000	Did not qualify								8	3	0	5	7	16	—N/a					
(Portugal) 2004	Did not qualify								10	4	2	4	13	11	2	0	1	1	0	1
(Austria) (Switzerland) 2008	Did not qualify								12	4	3	5	18	19	—N/a					
(Poland) (Ukraine) 2012	Did not qualify								8	3	0	5	6	10	—N/a					
(France) 2016	Semi-finals	3rd	6	4	0	2	10	6	10	6	3	1	11	4	—N/a					
(Europe) 2020	Round of 16	16th	4	1	1*	2	3	6	8	4	2	2	10	6	—N/a					
(Germany) 2024	Did not qualify								8	3	3	2	10	10	2	1	1	0	4	1
(United Kingdom) (Republic of Ireland) 2028	To be determined								To be determined						To be determined					
(Italy) (Turkey) 2032	To be determined								To be determined						To be determined					
Total	Semi-finals	2/17	10	5	1*	4	13	12	112	45	23	44	135	139	6	1	3	2	5	5

* Draws include knockout matches decided via penalty shoot-out.

Notes

Red border colour indicates tournament held on home soil.

Wales' European Championship record
First match	Wales 2–1 Slovakia (Nouveau Stade de Bordeaux, Bordeaux, France; 11 June 2016)
Biggest win	Russia 0–3 Wales (Stadium Municipal, Toulouse, France; 20 June 2016)
Biggest defeat	Wales 0–4 Denmark (Johan Cruyff Arena, Amsterdam, Netherlands; 26 June 2021)
Best result	Semi-finals at UEFA Euro 2016
Worst result	Round of 16 at UEFA Euro 2020
Top goalscorer	Gareth Bale, 3 (3 in 2016)

=== By opponent ===
UEFA European Championship matches
Opponents	Wins	Draws	Losses	Total
Belgium	1	0	0	1
Denmark	0	0	1	1
England	0	0	1	1
Italy	0	0	1	1
Northern Ireland	1	0	0	1
Portugal	0	0	1	1
Russia	1	0	0	1
Slovakia	1	0	0	1
Switzerland	0	1	0	1
Turkey	1	0	0	1

== List of matches ==
Year	Round	Opponent	Score	Result	Venue	Wales scorers
2016	Group stage	Slovakia	2–1	W	Bordeaux	Bale, Robson-Kanu
2016	Group stage	England	2–1	L	Lens	Bale
2016	Group stage	Russia	3–0	W	Toulouse	Ramsey, Taylor, Bale
2016	Round of 16	Northern Ireland	1–0	W	Paris	McAuley (o.g.)
2016	Quarter-finals	Belgium	3–1	W	Villeneuve-d'Ascq	Williams, Robson-Kanu, Vokes
2016	Semi-finals	Portugal	2–0	L	Décines-Charpieu	–
2020	Group stage	Switzerland	1-1	D	Baku	Moore
2020	Group stage	Turkey	2–0	W	Baku	Ramsey, Roberts
2020	Group stage	Italy	1–0	L	Rome	–
2020	Round of 16	Denmark	4–0	L	Amsterdam	–

== Goalscorers ==
Rank	Player	2016	2020	Total
1	Gareth Bale	3	0	3
2	Aaron Ramsey	1	1	2
2	Hal Robson-Kanu	2	—	2
4	Kieffer Moore	—	1	1
4	Connor Roberts	—	1	1
4	Neil Taylor	1	—	1
4	Sam Vokes	1	—	1
4	Ashley Williams	1	—	1

== See also ==
- Wales at the FIFA World Cup
