= UEFA Euro 2020 Group A =

Football tournament group stage

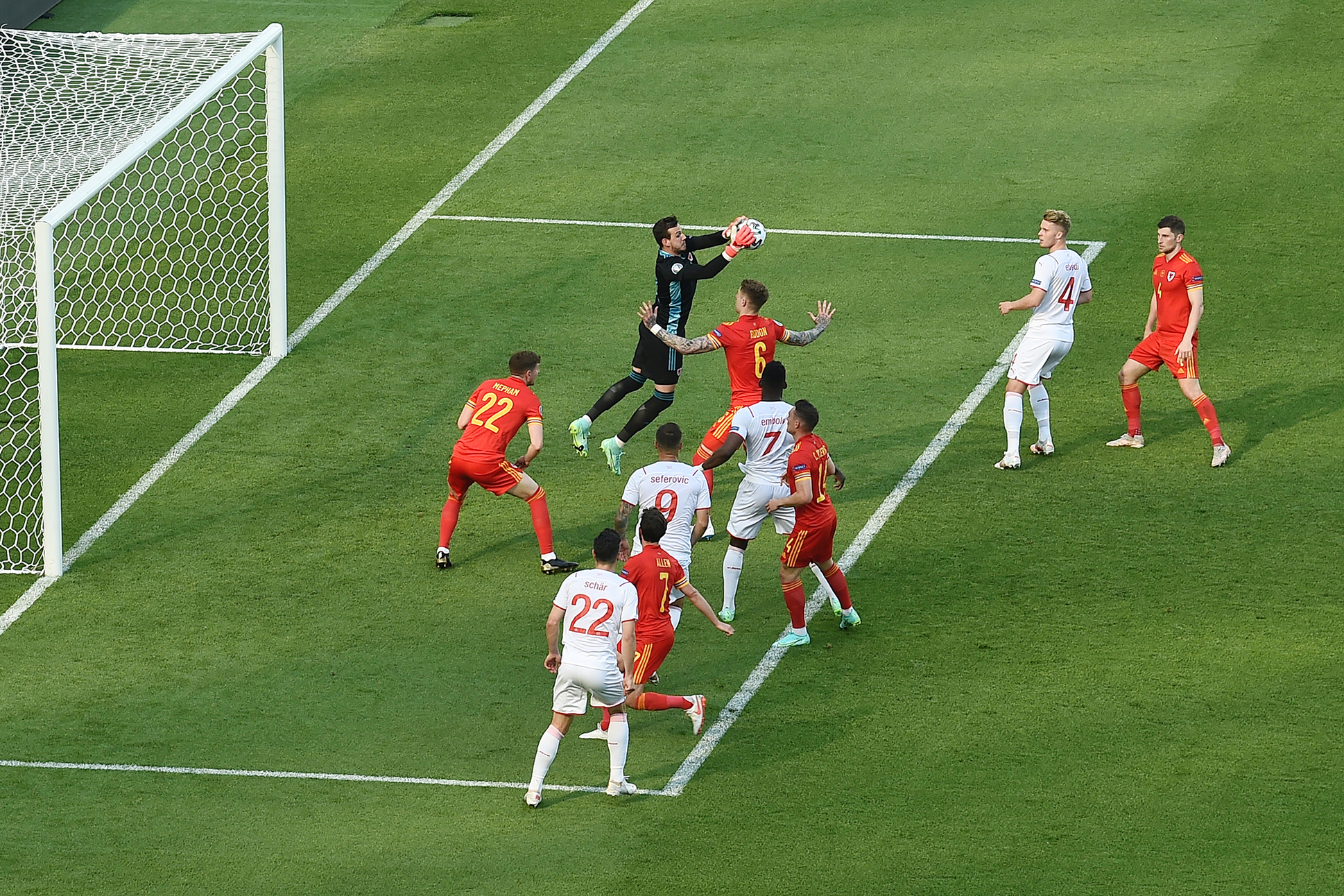
Goalkeeper Danny Ward catches the ball in Wales' match against Switzerland.

Group A of UEFA Euro 2020 took place from 11 to 20 June 2021 in Baku's Olympic Stadium and Rome's Stadio Olimpico. The group contained Turkey, host nation and eventual champions Italy, Wales and Switzerland.

== Teams ==
Draw position	Team	Pot	Method of qualification	Date of qualification	Finals appearance	Last appearance	Previous best performance	Qualifying Rankings November 2019 (Note: The European Qualifiers overall rankings from November 2019 were used for seeding for the final draw.)	FIFA Rankings May 2021
A1	Turkey	3	Group H runner-up	14 November 2019	5th	2016	Semi-finals (2008)	14	29
A2	Italy (host)	1	Group J winner	12 October 2019	10th	2016	Winners (1968)	2	7
A3	Wales	4	Group E runner-up	19 November 2019	2nd	2016	Semi-finals (2016)	19	17
A4	Switzerland	2	Group D winner	18 November 2019	5th	2016	Round of 16 (2016)	9	13

== Standings ==
Pos	Team	Pld	W	D	L	GF	GA	GD	Pts	Qualification
1	Italy (H)	3	3	0	0	7	0	+7	9	Advance to knockout stage
2	Wales	3	1	1	1	3	2	+1	4 (Note: Tied on head-to-head result (Wales 1–1 Switzerland). Overall goal difference was used as the tiebreaker.)	Advance to knockout stage
3	Switzerland	3	1	1	1	4	5	−1	4	Advance to knockout stage
4	Turkey	3	0	0	3	1	8	−7	0	

Source: UEFA
Rules for classification: Group stage tiebreakers
(H) Hosts
Notes:

In the round of 16,

- The winner of Group A, Italy, advanced to play the runner-up of Group C, Austria.
- The runner-up of Group A, Wales, advanced to play the runner-up of Group B, Denmark.
- The third-placed team of Group A, Switzerland, advanced as one of the four best third-placed teams to play the winner of Group F, France.

== Matches ==
=== Turkey vs Italy ===
11 June 2021
21:00

Turkey	0–3	Italy
	Report	Demiral 53' (o.g.); Immobile 66'; Insigne 79'

Stadio Olimpico, Rome
Attendance: 12,916
Referee: Danny Makkelie (Netherlands)

Turkey	Italy

GK	23	Uğurcan Çakır
RB	2	Zeki Çelik
CB	3	Merih Demiral
CB	4	Çağlar Söyüncü	(yellow card) 88'
LB	13	Umut Meraş
DM	5	Okay Yokuşlu		(substituted off) 65'
RM	9	Kenan Karaman		(substituted off) 76'
CM	6	Ozan Tufan		(substituted off) 64'
CM	11	Yusuf Yazıcı		(substituted off) 46'
LM	10	Hakan Çalhanoğlu
CF	17	Burak Yılmaz (c)
Substitutions:
FW	7	Cengiz Ünder		(substituted on) 46'
DF	22	Kaan Ayhan		(substituted on) 64'
MF	21	İrfan Kahveci		(substituted on) 65'
MF	26	Halil Dervişoğlu	(yellow card) 90'	(substituted on) 76'
Manager:
Şenol Güneş

GK	21	Gianluigi Donnarumma
RB	24	Alessandro Florenzi	(substituted off) 46'
CB	19	Leonardo Bonucci
CB	3	Giorgio Chiellini (c)
LB	4	Leonardo Spinazzola
CM	18	Nicolò Barella
CM	8	Jorginho
CM	5	Manuel Locatelli	(substituted off) 74'
RF	11	Domenico Berardi	(substituted off) 85'
CF	17	Ciro Immobile	(substituted off) 81'
LF	10	Lorenzo Insigne	(substituted off) 81'
Substitutions:
DF	2	Giovanni Di Lorenzo	(substituted on) 46'
MF	16	Bryan Cristante	(substituted on) 74'
MF	14	Federico Chiesa	(substituted on) 81'
FW	9	Andrea Belotti	(substituted on) 81'
MF	20	Federico Bernardeschi	(substituted on) 85'
Manager:
Roberto Mancini

Man of the Match:
Leonardo Spinazzola (Italy)

Assistant referees:
Hessel Steegstra (Netherlands)
Jan de Vries (Netherlands)
Fourth official:
Stéphanie Frappart (France)
Reserve assistant referee:
Mikaël Berchebru (France)
Video assistant referee:
Kevin Blom (Netherlands)
Assistant video assistant referees:
Pol van Boekel (Netherlands)
Christian Gittelmann (Germany)
Christian Dingert (Germany)

=== Wales vs Switzerland ===
12 June 2021
15:00 (17:00 UTC+4)

Wales	1–1	Switzerland
Moore 74'	Report	Embolo 49'

Olympic Stadium, Baku
Attendance: 8,782
Referee: Clément Turpin (France)

Wales	Switzerland

GK	12	Danny Ward
RB	14	Connor Roberts
CB	6	Joe Rodon
CB	4	Ben Davies
LB	22	Chris Mepham
CM	16	Joe Morrell
CM	7	Joe Allen
CM	10	Aaron Ramsey		(substituted off) 90+3'
RF	20	Daniel James		(substituted off) 75'
CF	13	Kieffer Moore	(yellow card) 47'
LF	11	Gareth Bale (c)
Substitutions:
MF	19	David Brooks		(substituted on) 75'
DF	15	Ethan Ampadu		(substituted on) 90+3'
Manager:
Rob Page

GK	1	Yann Sommer
CB	4	Nico Elvedi
CB	22	Fabian Schär	(yellow card) 30'
CB	5	Manuel Akanji
RWB	2	Kevin Mbabu	(yellow card) 63'
LWB	13	Ricardo Rodriguez
CM	10	Granit Xhaka (c)
CM	8	Remo Freuler
AM	23	Xherdan Shaqiri		(substituted off) 66'
CF	7	Breel Embolo
CF	9	Haris Seferovic		(substituted off) 84'
Substitutions:
MF	6	Denis Zakaria		(substituted on) 66'
FW	19	Mario Gavranović		(substituted on) 84'
Manager:
Vladimir Petković

Man of the Match:
Breel Embolo (Switzerland)

Assistant referees:
Nicolas Danos (France)
Cyril Gringore (France)
Fourth official:
Srđan Jovanović (Serbia)
Reserve assistant referee:
Uroš Stojković (Serbia)
Video assistant referee:
François Letexier (France)
Assistant video assistant referees:
Jérôme Brisard (France)
Benjamin Pagès (France)
Paweł Gil (Poland)

=== Turkey vs Wales ===
16 June 2021
18:00 (20:00 UTC+4)

Turkey	0–2	Wales
	Report	Ramsey 42'; C. Roberts 90+5'

Olympic Stadium, Baku
Attendance: 19,762
Referee: Artur Soares Dias (Portugal)

Turkey	Wales

GK	23	Uğurcan Çakır
RB	2	Zeki Çelik
CB	22	Kaan Ayhan
CB	4	Çağlar Söyüncü
LB	13	Umut Meraş		(substituted off) 72'
DM	5	Okay Yokuşlu		(substituted off) 46'
CM	10	Hakan Çalhanoğlu	(yellow card) 90+2'
CM	6	Ozan Tufan		(substituted off) 46'
RW	9	Kenan Karaman		(substituted off) 75'
LW	7	Cengiz Ünder		(substituted off) 83'
CF	17	Burak Yılmaz (c)	(yellow card) 90+2'
Substitutions:
FW	11	Yusuf Yazıcı		(substituted on) 46'
DF	3	Merih Demiral		(substituted on) 46'
DF	25	Mert Müldür		(substituted on) 72'
MF	26	Halil Dervişoğlu		(substituted on) 75'
MF	21	İrfan Kahveci		(substituted on) 83'
Manager:
Şenol Güneş

GK	12	Danny Ward
RB	14	Connor Roberts
CB	22	Chris Mepham	(yellow card) 90+2'
CB	6	Joe Rodon
LB	4	Ben Davies	(yellow card) 90+2'
CM	16	Joe Morrell
CM	7	Joe Allen		(substituted off) 73'
RW	11	Gareth Bale (c)
AM	10	Aaron Ramsey		(substituted off) 85'
LW	20	Daniel James		(substituted off) 90+4'
CF	13	Kieffer Moore
Substitutions:
DF	15	Ethan Ampadu		(substituted on) 73'
MF	8	Harry Wilson		(substituted on) 85'
DF	3	Neco Williams		(substituted on) 90+4'
Manager:
Rob Page

Man of the Match:
Gareth Bale (Wales)

Assistant referees:
Rui Tavares (Portugal)
Paulo Soares (Portugal)
Fourth official:
Bartosz Frankowski (Poland)
Reserve assistant referee:
Marcin Boniek (Poland)
Video assistant referee:
João Pinheiro (Portugal)
Assistant video assistant referees:
François Letexier (France)
Íñigo Prieto López de Cerain (Spain)
Alejandro Hernández Hernández (Spain)

=== Italy vs Switzerland ===
16 June 2021
21:00

Italy	3–0	Switzerland
Locatelli 26', 52'; Immobile 89'	Report

Stadio Olimpico, Rome
Attendance: 12,445
Referee: Sergei Karasev (Russia)

Italy	Switzerland

GK	21	Gianluigi Donnarumma
RB	2	Giovanni Di Lorenzo
CB	19	Leonardo Bonucci
CB	3	Giorgio Chiellini (c)	(substituted off) 24'
LB	4	Leonardo Spinazzola
CM	18	Nicolò Barella	(substituted off) 86'
CM	8	Jorginho
CM	5	Manuel Locatelli	(substituted off) 86'
RF	11	Domenico Berardi	(substituted off) 70'
CF	17	Ciro Immobile
LF	10	Lorenzo Insigne	(substituted off) 69'
Substitutions:
DF	15	Francesco Acerbi	(substituted on) 24'
MF	14	Federico Chiesa	(substituted on) 69'
DF	25	Rafael Tolói	(substituted on) 70'
MF	12	Matteo Pessina	(substituted on) 86'
MF	16	Bryan Cristante	(substituted on) 86'
Manager:
Roberto Mancini

GK	1	Yann Sommer
CB	4	Nico Elvedi
CB	22	Fabian Schär		(substituted off) 57'
CB	5	Manuel Akanji
RM	2	Kevin Mbabu		(substituted off) 58'
CM	8	Remo Freuler		(substituted off) 84'
CM	10	Granit Xhaka (c)
LM	13	Ricardo Rodriguez
AM	23	Xherdan Shaqiri		(substituted off) 76'
CF	9	Haris Seferovic		(substituted off) 46'
CF	7	Breel Embolo	(yellow card) 79'
Substitutions:
FW	19	Mario Gavranović	(yellow card) 49'	(substituted on) 46'
MF	14	Steven Zuber		(substituted on) 57'
DF	3	Silvan Widmer		(substituted on) 58'
MF	11	Rubén Vargas		(substituted on) 76'
MF	15	Djibril Sow		(substituted on) 84'
Manager:
Vladimir Petković

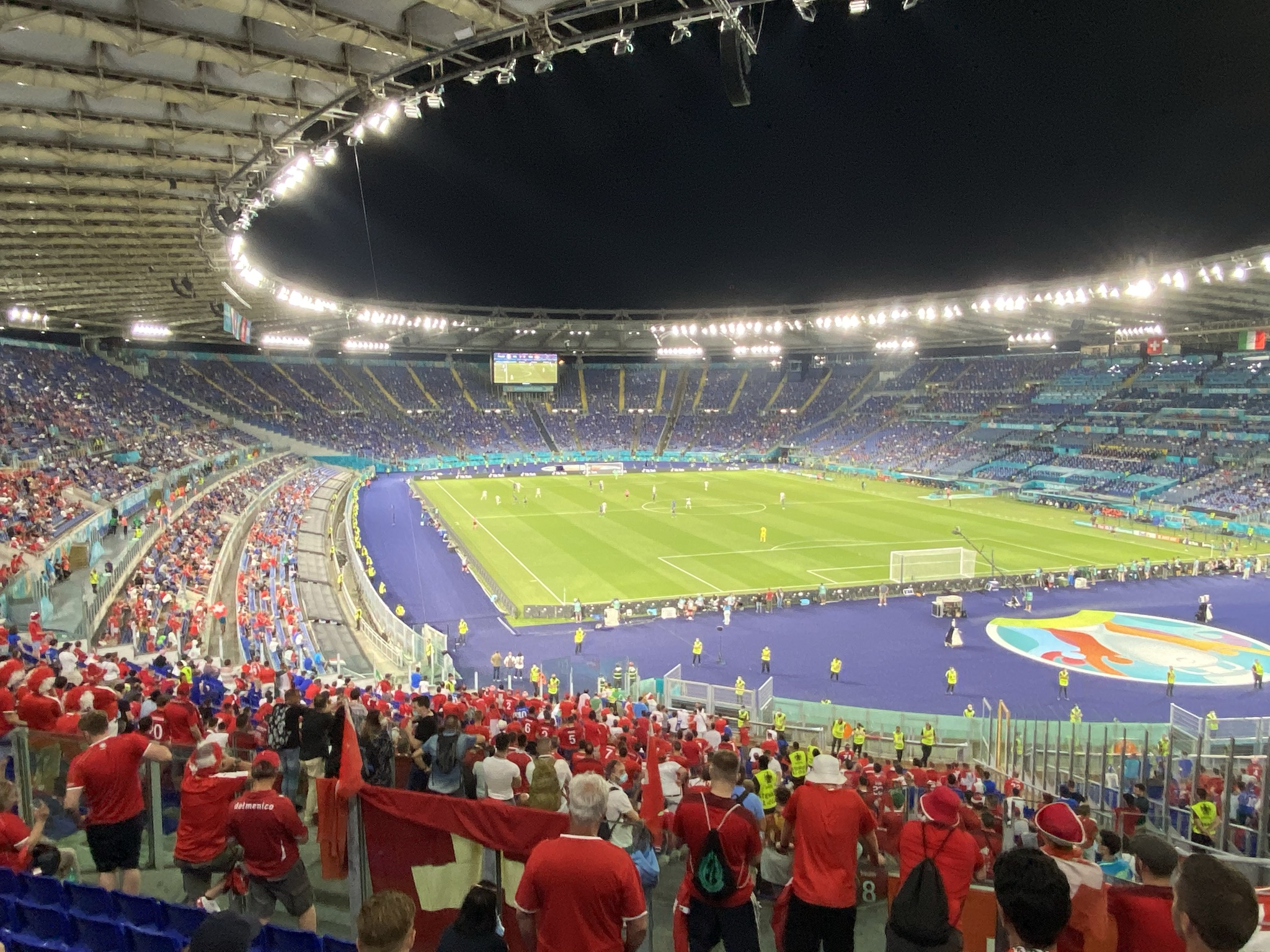
The Stadio Olimpico during EURO 2020

Man of the Match:
Manuel Locatelli (Italy)

Assistant referees:
Igor Demeshko (Russia)
Maksim Gavrilin (Russia)
Fourth official:
Michael Oliver (England)
Reserve assistant referee:
Stuart Burt (England)
Video assistant referee:
Bastian Dankert (Germany)
Assistant video assistant referees:
Marco Fritz (Germany)
Christian Gittelmann (Germany)
Paweł Gil (Poland)

=== Switzerland vs Turkey ===
20 June 2021
18:00 (20:00 UTC+4)

Switzerland	3–1	Turkey
Seferovic 6'; Shaqiri 26', 68'	Report	Kahveci 62'

Olympic Stadium, Baku
Attendance: 17,138
Referee: Slavko Vinčić (Slovenia)

Switzerland	Turkey

GK	1	Yann Sommer
CB	4	Nico Elvedi
CB	5	Manuel Akanji
CB	13	Ricardo Rodriguez
RM	3	Silvan Widmer		(substituted off) 90+2'
CM	8	Remo Freuler
CM	10	Granit Xhaka (c)	(yellow card) 78'
LM	14	Steven Zuber		(substituted off) 85'
AM	23	Xherdan Shaqiri		(substituted off) 75'
CF	9	Haris Seferovic		(substituted off) 75'
CF	7	Breel Embolo		(substituted off) 85'
Substitutions:
FW	19	Mario Gavranović		(substituted on) 75'
MF	11	Rubén Vargas		(substituted on) 75'
DF	17	Loris Benito		(substituted on) 85'
FW	18	Admir Mehmedi		(substituted on) 85'
DF	2	Kevin Mbabu		(substituted on) 90+2'
Manager:
Vladimir Petković

GK	23	Uğurcan Çakır
RB	2	Zeki Çelik	(yellow card) 75'
CB	3	Merih Demiral
CB	4	Çağlar Söyüncü	(yellow card) 76'
LB	25	Mert Müldür
DM	22	Kaan Ayhan		(substituted off) 63'
CM	6	Ozan Tufan		(substituted off) 63'
CM	21	İrfan Kahveci		(substituted off) 80'
RW	7	Cengiz Ünder		(substituted off) 80'
LW	10	Hakan Çalhanoğlu	(yellow card) 70'	(substituted off) 86'
CF	17	Burak Yılmaz (c)
Substitutions:
FW	11	Yusuf Yazıcı		(substituted on) 63'
MF	5	Okay Yokuşlu		(substituted on) 63'
MF	19	Orkun Kökçü		(substituted on) 80'
FW	9	Kenan Karaman		(substituted on) 80'
MF	8	Dorukhan Toköz		(substituted on) 86'
Manager:
Şenol Güneş

Man of the Match:
Xherdan Shaqiri (Switzerland)

Assistant referees:
Tomaž Klančnik (Slovenia)
Andraž Kovačič (Slovenia)
Fourth official:
Andreas Ekberg (Sweden)
Reserve assistant referee:
Stefan Hallberg (Sweden)
Video assistant referee:
Bastian Dankert (Germany)
Assistant video assistant referees:
Christian Dingert (Germany)
Christian Gittelmann (Germany)
Marco Fritz (Germany)

=== Italy vs Wales ===
20 June 2021
18:00

Italy	1–0	Wales
Pessina 39'	Report

Stadio Olimpico, Rome
Attendance: 11,541
Referee: Ovidiu Hațegan (Romania)

Italy	Wales

GK	21	Gianluigi Donnarumma		(substituted off) 89'
RB	25	Rafael Tolói
CB	19	Leonardo Bonucci (c)		(substituted off) 46'
CB	23	Alessandro Bastoni
LB	13	Emerson Palmieri
CM	12	Matteo Pessina	(yellow card) 79'	(substituted off) 87'
CM	8	Jorginho		(substituted off) 75'
CM	6	Marco Verratti
RF	14	Federico Chiesa
CF	9	Andrea Belotti
LF	20	Federico Bernardeschi		(substituted off) 75'
Substitutions:
DF	15	Francesco Acerbi		(substituted on) 46'
MF	16	Bryan Cristante		(substituted on) 75'
FW	22	Giacomo Raspadori		(substituted on) 75'
MF	7	Gaetano Castrovilli		(substituted on) 87'
GK	1	Salvatore Sirigu		(substituted on) 89'
Manager:
Roberto Mancini

GK	12	Danny Ward
CB	2	Chris Gunter	(yellow card) 79'
CB	6	Joe Rodon
CB	15	Ethan Ampadu	(red card) 55'
RM	14	Connor Roberts
CM	7	Joe Allen	(yellow card) 51'	(substituted off) 86'
CM	16	Joe Morrell		(substituted off) 60'
LM	3	Neco Williams		(substituted off) 86'
RF	11	Gareth Bale (c)		(substituted off) 86'
CF	10	Aaron Ramsey
LF	20	Daniel James		(substituted off) 74'
Substitutions:
FW	13	Kieffer Moore		(substituted on) 60'
MF	8	Harry Wilson		(substituted on) 74'
MF	19	David Brooks		(substituted on) 86'
DF	4	Ben Davies		(substituted on) 86'
MF	23	Dylan Levitt		(substituted on) 86'
Manager:
Rob Page

Man of the Match:
Federico Chiesa (Italy)

Assistant referees:
Radu Ghinguleac (Romania)
Sebastian Gheorghe (Romania)
Fourth official:
Orel Grinfeld (Israel)
Reserve assistant referee:
Roy Hassan (Israel)
Video assistant referee:
Paweł Gil (Poland)
Assistant video assistant referees:
François Letexier (France)
Benjamin Pagès (France)
Pol van Boekel (Netherlands)

== Discipline ==
Fair play points were to be used as a tiebreaker if the head-to-head and overall records of teams were tied (and if a penalty shoot-out was not applicable as a tiebreaker). These were calculated based on yellow and red cards received in all group matches as follows:

- yellow card = 1 point
- red card as a result of two yellow cards = 3 points
- direct red card = 3 points
- yellow card followed by direct red card = 4 points

Only one of the above deductions was applied to a player in a single match.

Team	Match 1				Match 2				Match 3				Points
Team	Booked	(yellow card) (yellow-red card)	Sent off (straight red)	(yellow card) (red card)	Booked	(yellow card) (yellow-red card)	Sent off (straight red)	(yellow card) (red card)	Booked	(yellow card) (yellow-red card)	Sent off (straight red)	(yellow card) (red card)	Points
Italy									1				−1
Switzerland	2				2				1				−5
Turkey	2				2				3				−7
Wales	1				2				2		1		−8

== See also ==
- Italy at the UEFA European Championship
- Switzerland at the UEFA European Championship
- Turkey at the UEFA European Championship
- Wales at the UEFA European Championship
