= UEFA Euro 2016 Group B =

Football tournament group stage

Group B of UEFA Euro 2016 contained England, Russia, Wales and Slovakia. Within this group, only Russia was a former European champion, having won as the Soviet Union in 1960. This was Wales' and Slovakia's (as an independent nation) first appearance at the European Championship. Matches were played from 11 to 20 June 2016.

== Teams ==
Draw position	Team	Pot	Method of qualification	Date of qualification	Finals appearance	Last appearance	Previous best performance	UEFA Rankings October 2015 (Note: The UEFA rankings of October 2015 were used for seeding for the final draw.)	FIFA Rankings June 2016
B1	England	1	Group E winner	5 September 2015	9th	2012	Third place (1968), Semi-finals (1996)	3	11
B2	Russia (Note: From 1960 to 1988, Russia competed as the Soviet Union, and in 1992 as the CIS.)	2	Group G runner-up	12 October 2015	11th	2012	Winners (1960)	9	29
B3	Wales	4	Group B runner-up	10 October 2015	1st	—	Debut	28	26
B4	Slovakia (Note: From 1960 to 1980, Slovakia competed as Czechoslovakia.)	3	Group C runner-up	12 October 2015	4th	1980	Winners (1976)	19	24

== Standings ==
Pos	Team	Pld	W	D	L	GF	GA	GD	Pts	Qualification
1	Wales	3	2	0	1	6	3	+3	6	Advance to knockout stage
2	England	3	1	2	0	3	2	+1	5	Advance to knockout stage
3	Slovakia	3	1	1	1	3	3	0	4	Advance to knockout stage
4	Russia	3	0	1	2	2	6	−4	1	

Source: UEFA
Rules for classification: Group stage tiebreakers

In the round of 16,

- The winner of Group B, Wales, advanced to play the third-placed team of Group C, Northern Ireland.
- The runner-up of Group B, England, advanced to play the runner-up of Group F, Iceland.
- The third-placed team of Group B, Slovakia, advanced as one of the four best third-placed teams to play the winner of Group C, Germany.

== Matches ==
=== Wales vs Slovakia ===
11 June 2016
18:00

Wales	2–1	Slovakia
Bale 10'; Robson-Kanu 81'	Report	Duda 61'

Stade de Bordeaux, Bordeaux
Attendance: 37,831
Referee: Svein Oddvar Moen (Norway)

Wales	Slovakia

GK	21	Danny Ward
CB	5	James Chester
CB	6	Ashley Williams (c)
CB	4	Ben Davies
CM	7	Joe Allen
CM	14	David Edwards	(substituted off) 69'
CM	10	Aaron Ramsey	(substituted off) 88'
RW	2	Chris Gunter
LW	3	Neil Taylor
CF	20	Jonny Williams	(substituted off) 71'
CF	11	Gareth Bale
Substitutions:
MF	16	Joe Ledley	(substituted on) 69'
FW	9	Hal Robson-Kanu	(substituted on) 71'
DF	15	Jazz Richards	(substituted on) 88'
Manager:
Chris Coleman

GK	23	Matúš Kozáčik
RB	2	Peter Pekarík
CB	3	Martin Škrtel (c)	(yellow card) 90+2'
CB	4	Ján Ďurica
LB	18	Dušan Švento
CM	19	Juraj Kucka	(yellow card) 83'
CM	13	Patrik Hrošovský	(yellow card) 31'	(substituted off) 60'
CM	17	Marek Hamšík
RW	20	Róbert Mak	(yellow card) 78'
LW	7	Vladimír Weiss	(yellow card) 80'	(substituted off) 83'
CF	21	Michal Ďuriš		(substituted off) 59'
Substitutions:
FW	11	Adam Nemec		(substituted on) 59'
MF	8	Ondrej Duda		(substituted on) 60'
MF	10	Miroslav Stoch		(substituted on) 83'
Manager:
Ján Kozák

Man of the Match:
Joe Allen (Wales)

Assistant referees:
Kim Thomas Haglund (Norway)
Frank Andås (Norway)
Fourth official:
Aleksei Kulbakov (Belarus)
Additional assistant referees:
Ken Henry Johnsen (Norway)
Svein-Erik Edvartsen (Norway)
Reserve assistant referee:
Vitali Maliutsin (Belarus)

=== England vs Russia ===
11 June 2016
21:00

England	1–1	Russia
Dier 73'	Report	V. Berezutski 90+2'

Stade Vélodrome, Marseille
Attendance: 62,343
Referee: Nicola Rizzoli (Italy)

England	Russia

GK	1	Joe Hart
RB	2	Kyle Walker
CB	5	Gary Cahill	(yellow card) 62'
CB	6	Chris Smalling
LB	3	Danny Rose
CM	20	Dele Alli
CM	17	Eric Dier
CM	10	Wayne Rooney (c)		(substituted off) 78'
RW	8	Adam Lallana
LW	7	Raheem Sterling		(substituted off) 87'
CF	9	Harry Kane
Substitutions:
MF	18	Jack Wilshere		(substituted on) 78'
MF	4	James Milner		(substituted on) 87'
Manager:
Roy Hodgson

GK	1	Igor Akinfeev
RB	3	Igor Smolnikov
CB	4	Sergei Ignashevich
CB	14	Vasili Berezutski (c)
LB	21	Georgi Shchennikov	(yellow card) 72'
CM	5	Roman Neustädter		(substituted off) 80'
CM	13	Aleksandr Golovin		(substituted off) 77'
RW	10	Fyodor Smolov		(substituted off) 85'
AM	17	Oleg Shatov
LW	9	Aleksandr Kokorin
CF	22	Artem Dzyuba
Substitutions:
MF	15	Roman Shirokov		(substituted on) 77'
MF	8	Denis Glushakov		(substituted on) 80'
MF	11	Pavel Mamayev		(substituted on) 85'
Manager:
Leonid Slutsky

Man of the Match:
Eric Dier (England)

Assistant referees:
Elenito Di Liberatore (Italy)
Mauro Tonolini (Italy)
Fourth official:
Anastasios Sidiropoulos (Greece)
Additional assistant referees:
Daniele Orsato (Italy)
Antonio Damato (Italy)
Reserve assistant referee:
Damianos Efthymiadis (Greece)

=== Russia vs Slovakia ===
15 June 2016
15:00

Russia	1–2	Slovakia
Glushakov 80'	Report	Weiss 32'; Hamšík 45'

Stade Pierre-Mauroy, Villeneuve-d'Ascq
Attendance: 38,989
Referee: Damir Skomina (Slovenia)

Russia	Slovakia

GK	1	Igor Akinfeev
RB	3	Igor Smolnikov
CB	14	Vasili Berezutski (c)
CB	4	Sergei Ignashevich
LB	21	Georgi Shchennikov
CM	13	Aleksandr Golovin	(substituted off) 46'
CM	5	Roman Neustädter	(substituted off) 46'
RW	9	Aleksandr Kokorin	(substituted off) 75'
AM	17	Oleg Shatov
LW	10	Fyodor Smolov
CF	22	Artem Dzyuba
Substitutions:
MF	11	Pavel Mamayev	(substituted on) 46'
MF	8	Denis Glushakov	(substituted on) 46'
MF	15	Roman Shirokov	(substituted on) 75'
Manager:
Leonid Slutsky

GK	23	Matúš Kozáčik
RB	2	Peter Pekarík
CB	3	Martin Škrtel (c)
CB	4	Ján Ďurica	(yellow card) 46'
LB	15	Tomáš Hubočan
CM	19	Juraj Kucka
CM	22	Viktor Pečovský
CM	17	Marek Hamšík
RW	20	Róbert Mak		(substituted off) 80'
LW	7	Vladimír Weiss		(substituted off) 72'
CF	8	Ondrej Duda		(substituted off) 67'
Substitutions:
FW	11	Adam Nemec		(substituted on) 67'
DF	18	Dušan Švento		(substituted on) 72'
FW	21	Michal Ďuriš		(substituted on) 80'
Manager:
Ján Kozák

Man of the Match:
Marek Hamšík (Slovakia)

Assistant referees:
Jure Praprotnik (Slovenia)
Robert Vukan (Slovenia)
Fourth official:
Jonas Eriksson (Sweden)
Additional assistant referees:
Matej Jug (Slovenia)
Slavko Vinčić (Slovenia)
Reserve assistant referee:
Mathias Klasenius (Sweden)

=== England vs Wales ===
16 June 2016
15:00

England	2–1	Wales
Vardy 56'; Sturridge 90+2'	Report	Bale 42'

Stade Bollaert-Delelis, Lens
Attendance: 34,033
Referee: Felix Brych (Germany)

England	Wales

GK	1	Joe Hart
RB	2	Kyle Walker
CB	5	Gary Cahill
CB	6	Chris Smalling
LB	3	Danny Rose
CM	20	Dele Alli
CM	17	Eric Dier
CM	10	Wayne Rooney (c)
RW	8	Adam Lallana	(substituted off) 73'
LW	7	Raheem Sterling	(substituted off) 46'
CF	9	Harry Kane	(substituted off) 46'
Substitutions:
FW	15	Daniel Sturridge	(substituted on) 46'
FW	11	Jamie Vardy	(substituted on) 46'
FW	22	Marcus Rashford	(substituted on) 73'
Manager:
Roy Hodgson

GK	1	Wayne Hennessey
CB	5	James Chester
CB	6	Ashley Williams (c)
CB	4	Ben Davies	(yellow card) 61'
RWB	2	Chris Gunter
LWB	3	Neil Taylor
CM	10	Aaron Ramsey
CM	16	Joe Ledley		(substituted off) 67'
CM	7	Joe Allen
CF	9	Hal Robson-Kanu		(substituted off) 72'
CF	11	Gareth Bale
Substitutions:
MF	14	David Edwards		(substituted on) 67'
MF	20	Jonny Williams		(substituted on) 72'
Manager:
Chris Coleman

Man of the Match:
Kyle Walker (England)

Assistant referees:
Mark Borsch (Germany)
Stefan Lupp (Germany)
Fourth official:
Matej Jug (Slovenia)
Additional assistant referees:
Bastian Dankert (Germany)
Marco Fritz (Germany)
Reserve assistant referee:
Robert Vukan (Slovenia)

=== Russia vs Wales ===
20 June 2016
21:00

Russia	0–3	Wales
	Report	Ramsey 11'; Taylor 20'; Bale 67'

Stadium Municipal, Toulouse
Attendance: 28,840
Referee: Jonas Eriksson (Sweden)

Russia	Wales

GK	1	Igor Akinfeev
RB	3	Igor Smolnikov
CB	14	Vasili Berezutski		(substituted off) 46'
CB	4	Sergei Ignashevich
LB	23	Dmitri Kombarov
CM	11	Pavel Mamayev	(yellow card) 64'
CM	8	Denis Glushakov
RW	10	Fyodor Smolov		(substituted off) 70'
AM	15	Roman Shirokov (c)		(substituted off) 52'
LW	9	Aleksandr Kokorin
CF	22	Artem Dzyuba
Substitutions:
DF	6	Aleksei Berezutski		(substituted on) 46'
MF	13	Aleksandr Golovin		(substituted on) 52'
MF	19	Aleksandr Samedov		(substituted on) 70'
Manager:
Leonid Slutsky

GK	1	Wayne Hennessey
CB	5	James Chester
CB	6	Ashley Williams (c)
CB	4	Ben Davies
RWB	2	Chris Gunter
LWB	3	Neil Taylor
CM	7	Joe Allen		(substituted off) 74'
CM	16	Joe Ledley		(substituted off) 76'
CM	10	Aaron Ramsey
CF	11	Gareth Bale		(substituted off) 83'
CF	18	Sam Vokes	(yellow card) 16'
Substitutions:
MF	14	David Edwards		(substituted on) 74'
MF	8	Andy King		(substituted on) 76'
FW	23	Simon Church		(substituted on) 83'
Manager:
Chris Coleman

Man of the Match:
Aaron Ramsey (Wales)

Assistant referees:
Mathias Klasenius (Sweden)
Daniel Wärnmark (Sweden)
Fourth official:
Daniele Orsato (Italy)
Additional assistant referees:
Stefan Johannesson (Sweden)
Markus Strömbergsson (Sweden)
Reserve assistant referee:
Mauro Tonolini (Italy)

=== Slovakia vs England ===
20 June 2016
21:00

Slovakia	0–0	England
	Report

Stade Geoffroy-Guichard, Saint-Étienne
Attendance: 39,051
Referee: Carlos Velasco Carballo (Spain)

Slovakia	England

GK	23	Matúš Kozáčik
RB	2	Peter Pekarík
CB	3	Martin Škrtel (c)
CB	4	Ján Ďurica
LB	15	Tomáš Hubočan
DM	22	Viktor Pečovský	(yellow card) 24'	(substituted off) 67'
CM	19	Juraj Kucka
CM	17	Marek Hamšík
RW	20	Róbert Mak
LW	7	Vladimír Weiss		(substituted off) 78'
CF	8	Ondrej Duda		(substituted off) 57'
Substitutions:
DF	18	Dušan Švento		(substituted on) 57'
DF	5	Norbert Gyömbér		(substituted on) 67'
DF	14	Milan Škriniar		(substituted on) 78'
Manager:
Ján Kozák

GK	1	Joe Hart
RB	12	Nathaniel Clyne
CB	5	Gary Cahill (c)
CB	6	Chris Smalling
LB	21	Ryan Bertrand	(yellow card) 52'
CM	14	Jordan Henderson
CM	17	Eric Dier
CM	18	Jack Wilshere		(substituted off) 56'
RW	8	Adam Lallana		(substituted off) 61'
LW	15	Daniel Sturridge		(substituted off) 76'
CF	11	Jamie Vardy
Substitutions:
FW	10	Wayne Rooney		(substituted on) 56'
MF	20	Dele Alli		(substituted on) 61'
FW	9	Harry Kane		(substituted on) 76'
Manager:
Roy Hodgson

Man of the Match:
Matúš Kozáčik (Slovakia)

Assistant referees:
Roberto Alonso Fernández (Spain)
Juan Carlos Yuste Jiménez (Spain)
Fourth official:
Antonio Damato (Italy)
Additional assistant referees:
Jesús Gil Manzano (Spain)
Carlos del Cerro Grande (Spain)
Reserve assistant referee:
Elenito Di Liberatore (Italy)

== See also ==
- England at the UEFA European Championship
- Russia at the UEFA European Championship
- Slovakia at the UEFA European Championship
- Wales at the UEFA European Championship
