= Slovakia at the UEFA European Championship =

International football delegation

As Slovakia along with the Czech Republic is considered to be the successor team of Czechoslovakia by FIFA and UEFA, they have qualified for a UEFA European Championship six times; three as Czechoslovakia and three as an independent nation since the dissolution of Czechoslovakia and its national team in 1993. As an independent nation, they directly qualified in 2016 after finishing second in their qualifying group. For the draw of the end stage that took place on 12 December 2015, they were seeded in Pot 3. As Czechoslovakia, they became European champions in 1976, with eight Slovaks in starting eleven. As Slovakia, their best finish was reaching the round of 16 at Euro 2016 and Euro 2024.

== Euro 2016 ==
=== Group stage ===
Pos	Team	Pld	W	D	L	GF	GA	GD	Pts	Qualification
1	Wales	3	2	0	1	6	3	+3	6	Advance to knockout stage
2	England	3	1	2	0	3	2	+1	5	Advance to knockout stage
3	Slovakia	3	1	1	1	3	3	0	4	Advance to knockout stage
4	Russia	3	0	1	2	2	6	−4	1	

Source: UEFA
Rules for classification: Group stage tiebreakers
11 June 2016
18:00

Wales	2–1	Slovakia
Bale 10'; Robson-Kanu 81'	Report	Duda 61'

Stade de Bordeaux, Bordeaux
Attendance: 37,831
Referee: Svein Oddvar Moen (Norway)

15 June 2016
15:00

Russia	1–2	Slovakia
Glushakov 80'	Report	Weiss 32'; Hamšík 45'

Stade Pierre-Mauroy, Villeneuve-d'Ascq
Attendance: 38,989
Referee: Damir Skomina (Slovenia)

20 June 2016
21:00

Slovakia	0–0	England
	Report

Stade Geoffroy-Guichard, Saint-Étienne
Attendance: 39,051
Referee: Carlos Velasco Carballo (Spain)

Ranking of third-placed teams

Pos	Grp	Team	Pld	W	D	L	GF	GA	GD	Pts	Qualification
1	B	Slovakia	3	1	1	1	3	3	0	4	Advance to knockout stage
2	E	Republic of Ireland	3	1	1	1	2	4	−2	4	Advance to knockout stage
3	F	Portugal	3	0	3	0	4	4	0	3	Advance to knockout stage
4	C	Northern Ireland	3	1	0	2	2	2	0	3	Advance to knockout stage
5	D	Turkey	3	1	0	2	2	4	−2	3	
6	A	Albania	3	1	0	2	1	3	−2	3	

Source: UEFA
Rules for classification: 1) Higher number of points obtained; 2) Superior goal difference; 3) Higher number of goals scored; 4) Fair play conduct; 5) Position in the UEFA national team coefficient ranking system.

=== Knockout stage ===
Round of 16

26 June 2016
18:00

Germany	3–0	Slovakia
Boateng 8'; Gómez 43'; Draxler 63'	Report

Stade Pierre-Mauroy, Villeneuve-d'Ascq
Attendance: 44,312
Referee: Szymon Marciniak (Poland)

== Euro 2020 ==
=== Group stage ===
Pos	Team	Pld	W	D	L	GF	GA	GD	Pts	Qualification
1	Sweden	3	2	1	0	4	2	+2	7	Advance to knockout stage
2	Spain (H)	3	1	2	0	6	1	+5	5	Advance to knockout stage
3	Slovakia	3	1	0	2	2	7	−5	3	
4	Poland	3	0	1	2	4	6	−2	1	

Source: UEFA
Rules for classification: Group stage tiebreakers
(H) Hosts
14 June 2021
18:00 (19:00 UTC+3)

Poland	1–2	Slovakia
Linetty 46'	Report	Szczęsny 18' (o.g.); Škriniar 69'

Krestovsky Stadium, Saint Petersburg
Attendance: 12,862
Referee: Ovidiu Hațegan (Romania)

18 June 2021
15:00 (16:00 UTC+3)

Sweden	1–0	Slovakia
Forsberg 77' (pen.)	Report

Krestovsky Stadium, Saint Petersburg
Attendance: 11,525
Referee: Daniel Siebert (Germany)

23 June 2021
18:00

Slovakia	0–5	Spain
	Report	Dúbravka 30' (o.g.); Laporte 45+3'; Sarabia 56'; F. Torres 67'; Kucka 71' (o.g.)

Estadio de La Cartuja, Seville
Attendance: 11,204
Referee: Björn Kuipers (Netherlands)

Ranking of third-placed teams

Pos	Grp	Team	Pld	W	D	L	GF	GA	GD	Pts	Qualification
1	F	Portugal	3	1	1	1	7	6	+1	4	Advance to knockout stage
2	D	Czech Republic	3	1	1	1	3	2	+1	4	Advance to knockout stage
3	A	Switzerland	3	1	1	1	4	5	−1	4	Advance to knockout stage
4	C	Ukraine	3	1	0	2	4	5	−1	3	Advance to knockout stage
5	B	Finland	3	1	0	2	1	3	−2	3	
6	E	Slovakia	3	1	0	2	2	7	−5	3	

Source: UEFA
Rules for classification: 1) Points; 2) Goal difference; 3) Goals scored; 4) Wins; 5) Lower disciplinary points total; 6) European Qualifiers overall ranking.

== Euro 2024 ==
=== Group stage ===
Pos	Team	Pld	W	D	L	GF	GA	GD	Pts	Qualification
1	Romania	3	1	1	1	4	3	+1	4	Advance to knockout stage
2	Belgium	3	1	1	1	2	1	+1	4	Advance to knockout stage
3	Slovakia	3	1	1	1	3	3	0	4	Advance to knockout stage
4	Ukraine	3	1	1	1	2	4	−2	4	

Source: UEFA
17 June 2024
18:00

Belgium	0–1	Slovakia
	Report	Schranz 7'

Waldstadion, Frankfurt
Attendance: 45,181
Referee: Halil Umut Meler (Turkey)

21 June 2024
15:00

Slovakia	1–2	Ukraine
Schranz 17'	Report	Shaparenko 54'; Yaremchuk 80'

Merkur Spiel-Arena, Düsseldorf
Attendance: 43,910
Referee: Michael Oliver (England)

26 June 2024
18:00

Slovakia	1–1	Romania
Duda 24'	Report	R. Marin 37' (pen.)

Waldstadion, Frankfurt
Attendance: 45,033
Referee: Daniel Siebert (Germany)

Ranking of third-placed teams

Pos	Grp	Team	Pld	W	D	L	GF	GA	GD	Pts	Qualification
1	D	Netherlands	3	1	1	1	4	4	0	4 (Note: Disciplinary points: Netherlands −2, Georgia −6.)	Advance to knockout stage
2	F	Georgia	3	1	1	1	4	4	0	4	Advance to knockout stage
3	E	Slovakia	3	1	1	1	3	3	0	4	Advance to knockout stage
4	C	Slovenia	3	0	3	0	2	2	0	3	Advance to knockout stage
5	A	Hungary	3	1	0	2	2	5	−3	3	
6	B	Croatia	3	0	2	1	3	6	−3	2	

Source: UEFA
Rules for classification: 1) Points; 2) Goal difference; 3) Goals scored; 4) Wins; 5) Lower disciplinary points total; 6) European Qualifiers overall ranking (or drawing of lots, if hosts Germany had been involved in the tiebreaker).

==== Knockout stage ====
Round of 16

30 June 2024
18:00

England	2–1 (a.e.t.)	Slovakia
Bellingham 90+5'; Kane 91'	Report	Schranz 25'

Arena AufSchalke, Gelsenkirchen
Attendance: 47,244
Referee: Halil Umut Meler (Turkey)

== Overall record ==
UEFA European Championship record										Qualifying record						
Year	Result	Position	Pld	W	D	L	GF	GA	Squad	Pld	W	D	L	GF	GA	
as Czechoslovakia										as Czechoslovakia						
(France) 1960	Third place	3rd	2	1	0	1	2	3	Squad	6	4	1	1	16	5	1960
(Spain) 1964	Did not qualify									2	0	1	1	2	3	1964
(Italy) 1968	Did not qualify									6	3	1	2	8	4	1968
(Belgium) 1972	Did not qualify									6	4	1	1	11	4	1972
(Socialist Federal Republic of Yugoslavia) 1976	Champions	1st	2	1	1	0	5	3	Squad	8	5	2	1	19	7	1976
(Italy) 1980	Third place	3rd	4	1	2	1	5	4	Squad	6	5	0	1	17	4	1980
(France) 1984	Did not qualify									8	3	4	1	15	7	1984
(West Germany) 1988	Did not qualify									6	2	3	1	7	5	1988
(Sweden) 1992	Did not qualify									8	5	0	3	12	9	1992
as Slovakia										as Slovakia						
(England) 1996	Did not qualify									3rd	10	4	2	4	14	18
(Belgium) (Netherlands) 2000	Did not qualify									3rd	10	5	2	3	12	9
(Portugal) 2004	Did not qualify									3rd	8	3	1	4	11	9
(Austria) (Switzerland) 2008	Did not qualify									4th	12	5	1	6	33	23
(Poland) (Ukraine) 2012	Did not qualify									4th	10	4	3	3	7	10
(France) 2016	Round of 16	14th	4	1	1	2	3	6	Squad	2nd	10	7	1	2	17	8
(Europe) 2020	Group stage	18th	3	1	0	2	2	7	Squad	3rd	10	5	2	3	15	12
(Germany) 2024	Round of 16	12th	4	1	1	2	4	5	Squad	2nd	10	7	1	2	17	8
(United Kingdom) (Republic of Ireland) 2028	To be determined									To be determined						
(Italy) (Turkey) 2032	To be determined									To be determined						
Total	1 Title	6/17	19	6	5	8	21	28	—	—	136	71	26	39	233	145

*Denotes draws including knockout matches decided via penalty shoot-out.

== See also ==
- Slovakia at the FIFA World Cup

== Head-to-head record ==
Opponent	Pld	W	D	L	GF	GA	GD	Win %
Belgium	1	1	0	0	1	0	+1	100.00
England	2	0	1	1	1	2	−1	0.00
Germany	1	0	0	1	0	3	−3	0.00
Poland	1	1	0	0	2	1	+1	100.00
Romania	1	0	1	0	1	1	+0	0.00
Russia	1	1	0	0	2	1	+1	100.00
Spain	1	0	0	1	0	5	−5	0.00
Sweden	1	0	0	1	0	1	−1	0.00
Ukraine	1	0	0	1	1	2	−1	0.00
Wales	1	0	0	1	1	2	−1	0.00
Total	11	3	2	6	9	18	−9	27.27
