= Neil Taylor (footballer) =

Welsh footballer (born 1989)

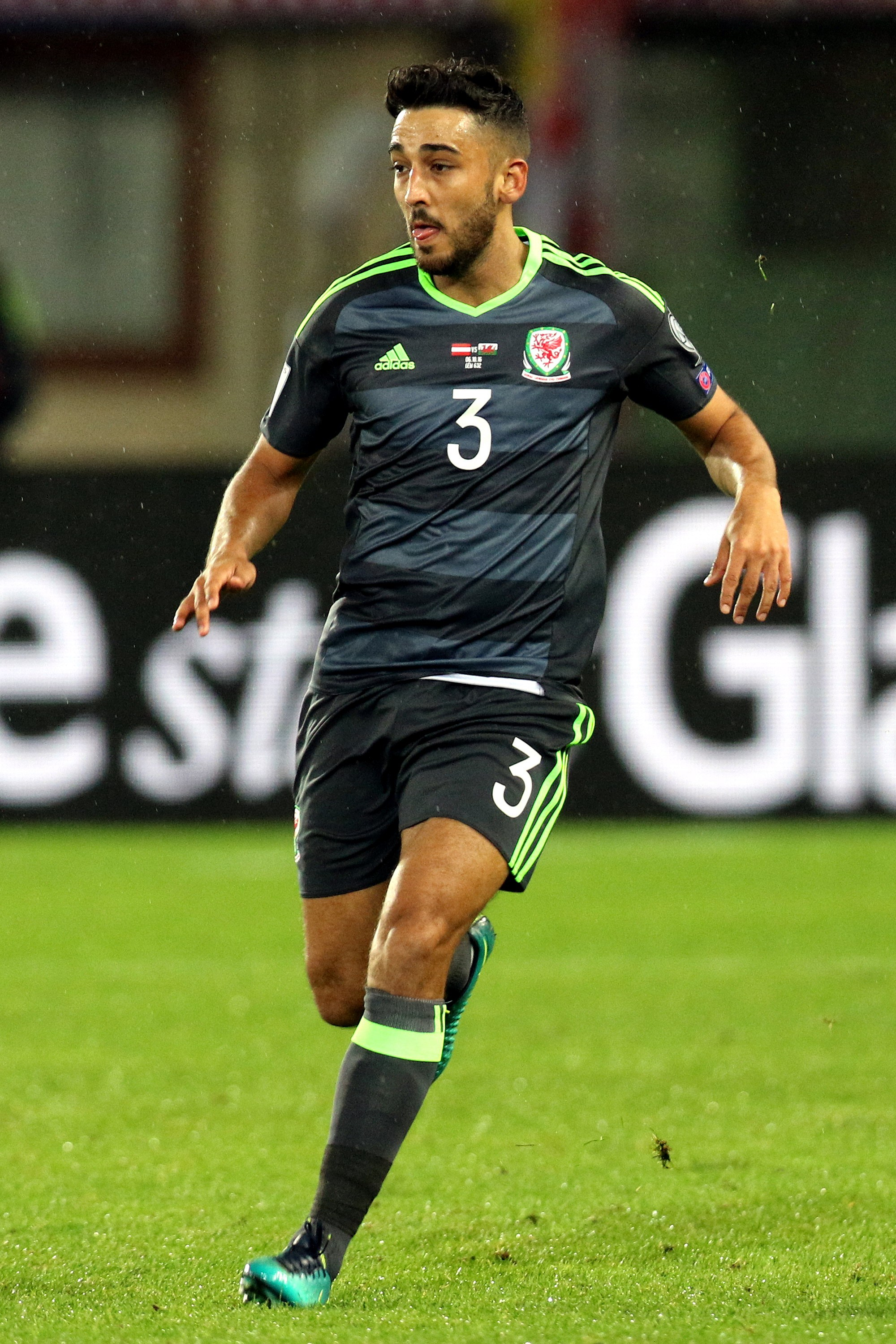
- Taylor playing for Wales in 2016

Personal information
- Full name: Neil John Taylor
- Date of birth: 7 February 1989 (age 37)
- Place of birth: St Asaph, Wales
- Height: 5 ft 9 in (1.76 m)
- Positions: Left-back; left wing-back

Youth career
- 1998–2005: Manchester City
- 2005–2007: Wrexham

Senior career*
Years	Team	Apps	(Gls)
2007–2010	Wrexham	75	(3)
2010–2017	Swansea City	160	(0)
2017–2021	Aston Villa	89	(0)
2021–2022	Middlesbrough	14	(0)
Total		338	(3)

International career
2005–2006	Wales U17	10	(0)
2006–2007	Wales U19	5	(0)
2007–2010	Wales U21	13	(0)
2009	Wales Semi-Pro	1	(0)
2010–2019	Wales	43	(1)
2012	Great Britain Olympic	5	(0)

Managerial career
- 2023–2024: Gulf United
- 2026–: Wales U18
Medal record
Men's football
Representing Wales (as player)
UEFA European Championship
Bronze medal – third place	2016 France
- * Club domestic league appearances and goals

Neil John Taylor (born 7 February 1989) is a Welsh professional football manager and former player who played as a left-back or left wing-back. He is currently the manager of the Wales national under-18 team.

A former Manchester City academy trainee, he began his career with native club Wrexham in 2007 and moved to Swansea City for an initial £150,000 in 2010, going on to make 179 appearances for the Swans. He joined Aston Villa in January 2017 as part of a swap for Jordan Ayew, and made 103 total appearances. After being released, he signed for Middlesbrough in November 2021, where he played for in the final season of his career, before retiring a year later.

Taylor made his full international debut for Wales in 2010, and earned 43 caps up to 2019. He was part of their squad which reached the semi-finals at UEFA Euro 2016, and also represented Great Britain at the 2012 Olympics on home soil. Born to a Bengali mother from Kolkata, he was one of a relatively small number of British Asians in professional football.

== Club career ==
=== Wrexham ===
Taylor began his career at Manchester City, but left the club at the age of 15. He instead moved to Wrexham at the age of 16, progressing through the youth system at the club, signing a professional contract in July 2007. He made his professional debut on 28 August 2007 in the second round of the League Cup, as a 79th-minute substitute for Eifion Williams in a 0–5 home loss to Aston Villa at the Racecourse Ground. On 22 September, he made his league debut, starting in a 2–1 League Two loss at Stockport County, crossing for the opening goal by Marc Williams. He finished the 2007–08 season when he made 27 league and cup appearances. He signed an extension to his contract on 13 March 2008, keeping him at Wrexham until 2010. Wrexham finished the season with relegation out of The Football League.

On 7 October 2008, Taylor scored his first career goal in a 3–1 home win over York City in the Conference Premier, a match in which he was captain, and followed it up with another in a 5–0 rout of Eastbourne Borough on 20 December. His only other Wrexham goal came in his last appearance on 10 April 2010, volleying to conclude a 2–0 win at relegated Grays Athletic.

=== Swansea City ===
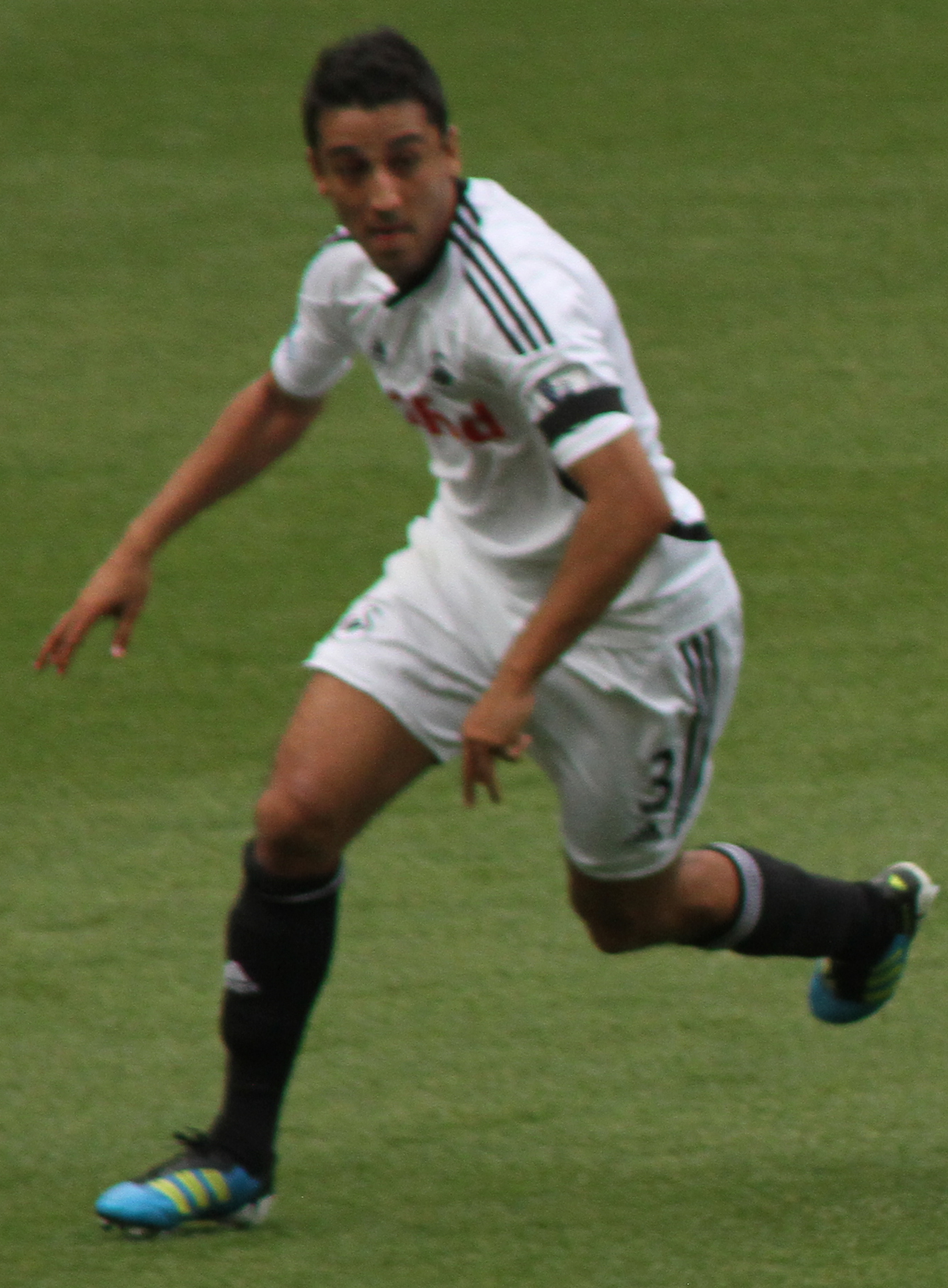
Taylor playing for Swansea City in 2011

At the end of the 2009–10 season, Taylor joined Football League Championship side Swansea City on a free transfer. A fee of £150,000 plus 10% of any future profit was agreed between the two clubs just before entering a professional footballers compensation committee tribunal on 30 September 2010. He made his Swans debut on 21 August, as a half-time substitute for Albert Serrán in a 2–0 defeat at Norwich City. He had played 15 league matches, due to injuries and suspensions, before spraining his ankle against Reading on 1 January 2011. He made his return on 19 February against Doncaster Rovers, the same week where both he and captain Garry Monk became fathers. On 12 May, in the Championship play-off semi-final first leg against Nottingham Forest, Taylor was sent off after 53 seconds for a high challenge on Lewis McGugan, with the match ending in a goalless draw.

His impressive form then sparked a £1 million plus bid from Newcastle United that summer, but he committed himself to the Swans instead with a contract extension. That paid off for both player and club as Taylor again enjoyed a successful season in helping the Swans to 11th spot in their first Premier League campaign.

Taylor suffered a broken ankle in the match against Sunderland on 1 September 2012 after falling awkwardly during a challenge on Craig Gardner in the early stages of the match and was ruled out until the end of the season. On 14 December 2012, Taylor signed a new three-and-a-half-year contract with Swansea, lasting until 2016.

In late February, Taylor returned to full training after six months out with injury. Shortly before his return, Swansea City won the League Cup Final following a 5–0 win over League Two side Bradford City. In late April, he played 80 minutes for Swansea City U21s as part of his rehabilitation. Taylor made his first senior appearance since his injury as a substitute for Ben Davies in a 2–0 loss against Chelsea on 28 April 2013. After the match, he expressed relief at his return to the first team.

After Taylor's return, Swansea manager Michael Laudrup described the battle for the left-back slot between Taylor and Davies as "a beautiful problem for a manager to have". Following the transfer of Davies to Tottenham Hotspur in 2014, Taylor reestablished himself as first-choice left back for Swansea. Taylor signed a new four-year contract in June 2015, tying him to the club until 2019.

=== Aston Villa ===
After his position as Swansea's left back was challenged by Stephen Kingsley and Martin Olsson, on 31 January 2017 Taylor joined Championship side Aston Villa along with an estimated £5 million in exchange for Jordan Ayew. He made his debut eleven days later in a 1–0 home loss to Ipswich Town, starting and playing 77 minutes while wearing a protective mask over his fractured cheekbone. Manager Steve Bruce said he did well given his injury and lack of match practice.

On 30 September 2017, Taylor was sent off at the end of a 1–0 home win over Bolton Wanderers for a foul on Adam Le Fondre. He was not included in the Villa team that lost the 2018 EFL Championship play-off final, but played as they won against Derby County in the next year's edition, promoting them to the Premier League.

Having been mostly inactive due to injury, Taylor played just 14 Premier League games in the 2019–20 season, as Villa avoided the drop on the final day. In the 2020–21 season, he was frequently benched under deputed left-back Matt Targett. However, he made just one 15-minute league appearance as a substitute for the injured Targett in a 2–0 loss against Manchester City on 20 January 2021.

In May 2021, Aston Villa announced that Taylor would leave the club when his contract expired at the end of the season.

=== Middlesbrough ===
On 18 November 2021, Taylor joined Championship side Middlesbrough on a short-term contract until the middle of January. He made his debut on 18 December, with Chris Wilder picking him ahead of Marc Bola for a 1–0 home win over AFC Bournemouth, after which Wilder praised him. On 14 January, having made one more appearance and with Bola suffering a knee injury, Taylor's deal was extended for the rest of the 2021–22 season. Taylor was released by Middlesbrough at the end of the season.

On 7 November 2022, Taylor announced his retirement from professional football via Twitter (now X).

== International career ==
=== Wales ===
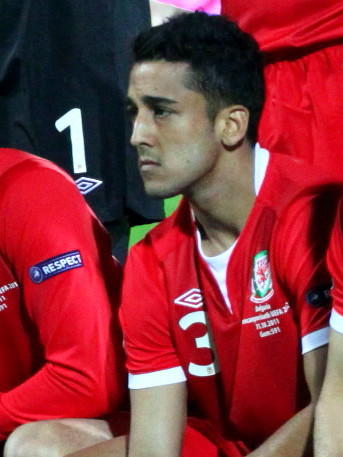
Taylor with Wales in 2011

Taylor was also eligible for India through his mother. He made his debut for Wales on 23 May 2010 in a friendly against Croatia at the Stadion Gradski vrt, replacing Andy Dorman for the final 23 minutes of the 2–0 loss; he and Mark Bradley had been promoted from the under-21 team in an emergency. In May 2011, he played two matches at the Nations Cup in Dublin.

On 9 September 2014, in Wales' first match of UEFA Euro 2016 qualification, he gave away a penalty to Andorra in the fifth minute, converted by Ildefons Lima, but the Welsh fought back for a 2–1 victory. At the final tournament in France, he played every minute as Wales reached a tournament semi-final for the first time. He scored his first international goal in a 3–0 group win over Russia; it was his first senior goal since one for Wrexham at Grays Athletic in April 2010.

On 24 March 2017, Taylor was sent off for breaking Séamus Coleman's leg in two places with a reckless tackle in a goalless draw against the Republic of Ireland in a 2018 FIFA World Cup qualifying game, leaving Coleman out injured for a year. Coleman needed surgery on a broken tibia and fibula and Taylor was given a two-match international ban by FIFA.

He withdrew from the national team in November 2019 for personal reasons, and subsequently retired from international football.

=== Great Britain ===
Stuart Pearce named Taylor in his 18-man squad for the 2012 Summer Olympics in London as one of three Swansea City players. He played his first match for Great Britain in a friendly against Brazil at the Riverside Stadium on 20 July. He then went on to appear in all of the team's group stage fixtures, helping to secure progression into the knockout stages.

== Coaching career ==
In March 2023, Taylor was appointed assistant to Wales under-21 manager Matt Jones.

On 1 September 2023, Taylor was appointed first-team manager of UAE First Division side Gulf United FC. The team is a private club who achieved back-to-back promotions from the UAE Second Division and UAE Third Division across the past two seasons. The club confirmed that he "will remain in his role as assistant coach with the Wales U21's National Team on international breaks throughout the season". In May 2024, he was one of twenty candidates to be issued a UEFA Pro Licence by the Football Association of Wales after completing a two-year course.

On 25 August 2024, Taylor departed Gulf United after one season in charge. In September 2026 Taylor replaced Chris Gunter as Wales under-18 manager.

== Personal life ==
Taylor was born in St Asaph, Denbighshire, and brought up in nearby Ruthin, where he attended Ysgol Brynhyfryd. He is of mixed Welsh-Bengali descent; his mother, Shibani Chakraborty, is an Indian Bengali from Kolkata, while his father, John Taylor, is Welsh. While playing for Swansea he lived with his wife Genna and their two children in Killay, Swansea. In a 2016 spring clean, they donated furniture worth thousands of pounds to be sold by the British Heart Foundation. Taylor travels to India to promote football, and has said that due to his name, the population are surprised to learn of his ancestry. Taylor became president of Ruthin Town in 2016.

== Career statistics ==
=== Club ===
Appearances and goals by club, season and competition
Club	Season	League			FA Cup		League Cup		Europe		Other		Total	
Club	Season	Division	Apps	Goals	Apps	Goals	Apps	Goals	Apps	Goals	Apps	Goals	Apps	Goals
Wrexham	2007–08	League Two	26	0	0	0	1	0	—		0	0	27	0
Wrexham	2008–09	Conference Premier	26	2	2	0	—		—		6 (Note: Two appearances in Conference League Cup, four in FA Trophy)	0	34	2
Wrexham	2009–10	Conference Premier	23	1	2	0	—		—		1 (Note: Appearance in FA Trophy)	0	26	1
Wrexham	Total		75	3	4	0	1	0	0	0	7	0	87	3
Swansea City	2010–11	Championship	29	0	0	0	2	0	—		1 (Note: Appearance(s) in Championship play-offs)	0	32	0
Swansea City	2011–12	Premier League	36	0	1	0	1	0	—		—		38	0
Swansea City	2012–13	Premier League	6	0	0	0	0	0	—		—		6	0
Swansea City	2013–14	Premier League	10	0	3	0	1	0	6 (Note: Appearance(s) in UEFA Europa League)	0	—		20	0
Swansea City	2014–15	Premier League	34	0	0	0	2	0	—		—		36	0
Swansea City	2015–16	Premier League	34	0	0	0	0	0	—		—		34	0
Swansea City	2016–17	Premier League	11	0	0	0	2	0	—		—		13	0
Swansea City	Total		160	0	4	0	8	0	6	0	1	0	179	0
Aston Villa	2016–17	Championship	14	0	—		—		—		—		14	0
Aston Villa	2017–18	Championship	29	0	1	0	0	0	—		—		30	0
Aston Villa	2018–19	Championship	31	0	1	0	2	0	—		3	0	37	0
Aston Villa	2019–20	Premier League	14	0	1	0	3	0	—		—		18	0
Aston Villa	2020–21	Premier League	1	0	0	0	3	0	—		—		4	0
Aston Villa	Total		89	0	3	0	8	0	0	0	3	0	103	0
Middlesbrough	2021–22	Championship	14	0	3	0	0	0	—		0	0	17	0
Total			338	3	14	0	17	0	6	0	11	0	386	3

=== International ===
Appearances and goals by national team and year
National team	Year	Apps	Goals
Wales	2010	1	0
Wales	2011	7	0
Wales	2012	2	0
Wales	2013	4	0
Wales	2014	6	0
Wales	2015	6	0
Wales	2016	12	1
Wales	2017	3	0
Wales	2018	0	0
Wales	2019	2	0
Total		43	1

Wales score listed first, score column indicates score after each Taylor goal.

International goals by date, venue, cap, opponent, score, result and competition
No.	Date	Venue	Cap	Opponent	Score	Result	Competition
1	20 June 2016	Stadium Municipal, Toulouse, France	31	Russia	2–0	3–0	UEFA Euro 2016

== Managerial statistics ==
As of match played 30 May 2024

Managerial record by team and tenure
Team	From	To	Record					Ref
Team	From	To	P	W	D	L	Win %	Ref
Gulf United	1 September 2023	25 August 2024	32	5	10	17	15.6	
Total			32	5	10	17	15.6	

== Honours ==
Aston Villa

- EFL Championship play-offs: 2019
- EFL Cup runner-up: 2019–20
