= Ben Davies (footballer, born 1993) =

Welsh footballer (born 1993)

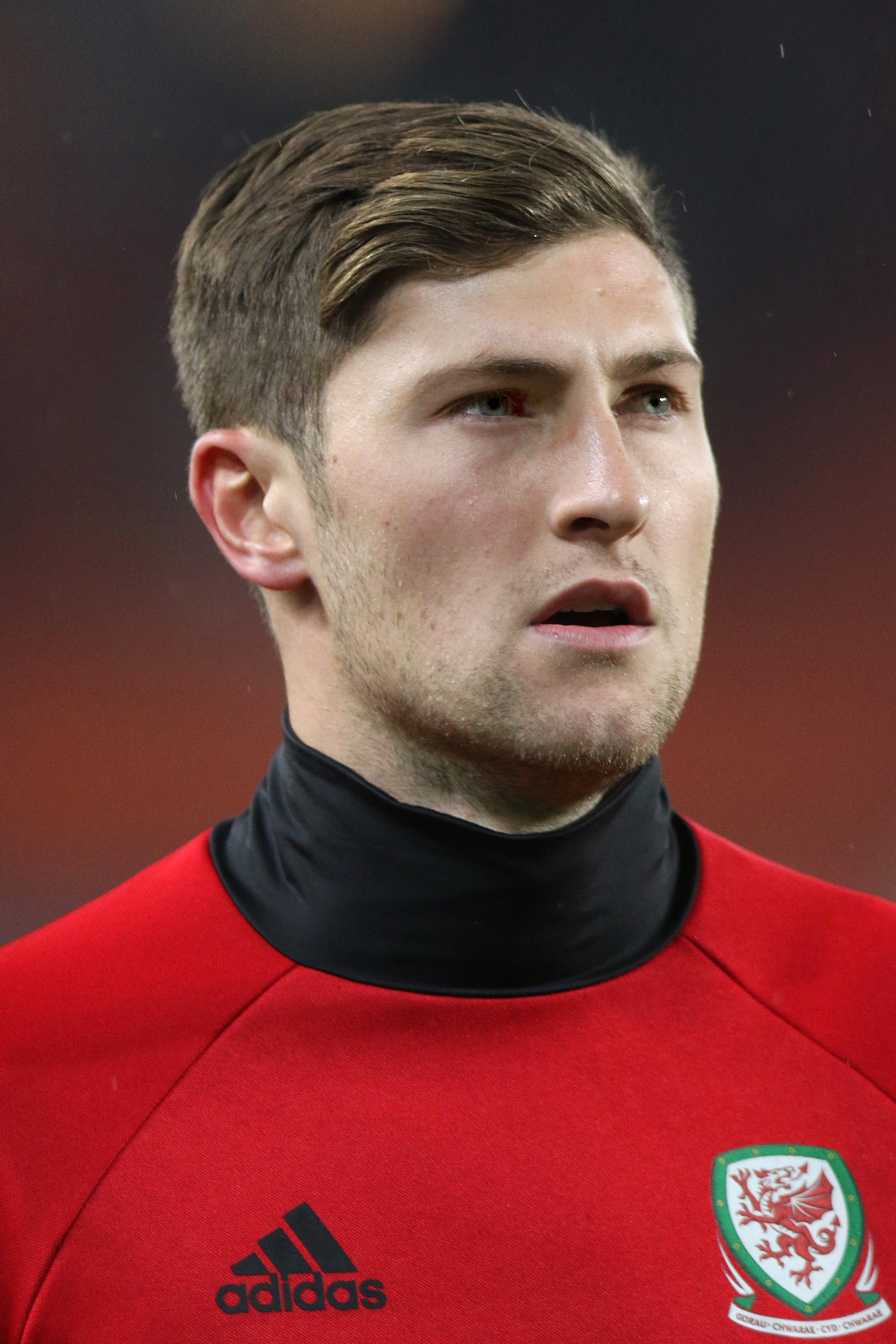
- Davies lining up for Wales in 2016

Personal information
- Full name: Benjamin Thomas Davies
- Date of birth: 24 April 1993 (age 33)
- Place of birth: Neath, Wales
- Height: 5 ft 11 in (1.81 m)
- Positions: Left-back; centre-back

Team information
- Current team: Tottenham Hotspur
- Number: 33

Youth career
- 2000–2001: Swansea City
- 2001–2004: Viborg FF
- 2004–2012: Swansea City

Senior career*
Years	Team	Apps	(Gls)
2012–2014	Swansea City	71	(3)
2014–	Tottenham Hotspur	247	(9)

International career^{‡}
2009	Wales U17	1	(0)
2011	Wales U19	5	(0)
2012–	Wales	106	(3)
Medal record
Men's football
Representing Wales
UEFA European Championship
Bronze medal – third place	2016 France
- * Club domestic league appearances and goals as of 23:44, 24 October 2026 (UTC) ‡ National team caps and goals as of 22:07, 17 November 2026 (UTC)

Benjamin Thomas Davies (born 24 April 1993) is a Welsh professional footballer who plays as a left-back and centre-back for Premier League club Tottenham Hotspur and captains the Wales national team. He is also a member of the Football Association of Wales Council.

Davies is an academy graduate of Swansea City, a Welsh club based in Swansea who play in the English football league system, also joining Danish club Viborg FF's academy while his family lived in Denmark. He made his professional debut for Swansea City in the second Premier League game of the 2012–13 season against West Ham United, scoring his first professional goal in a 3–1 Premier League win against Stoke City in January 2013. In the 2013–14 season, Davies was once again a regular for Swansea City.

In July 2014, Davies was signed by Tottenham Hotspur for an undisclosed fee, making his debut for Tottenham in a Europa League game against Cypriot side AEL Limassol. During Mauricio Pochettino's tenure, Davies battled Danny Rose for the starting left-back spot, but Davies was redeployed as a left-sided centre-back in a defensive back three by Antonio Conte.

Davies made three appearances for the Welsh national U-19 football team in his youth. His appearances all came as part of qualification for the 2012 UEFA European Under-19 Championship. Davies made his debut senior Welsh national team against Scotland at the 2014 FIFA World Cup qualification in 2012. He has since made 102 senior appearances for Wales, and represented the side at UEFA Euro 2016, reaching the semi-finals, and UEFA Euro 2020. Davies also helped Wales qualify for the FIFA World Cup in 2022, their first tournament appearance since 1958.

== Early life ==
Davies was born in Neath, West Glamorgan. After spending time in the youth academy at Swansea City, he and his family moved to Viborg, Denmark, after his father accepted a job offer. They spent three years living in Denmark, where he played for Viborg FF's youth team before returning to Swansea. Davies attended Ysgol Gyfun Ystalyfera and he is a fluent Welsh language speaker.

== Club career ==
=== Swansea City ===
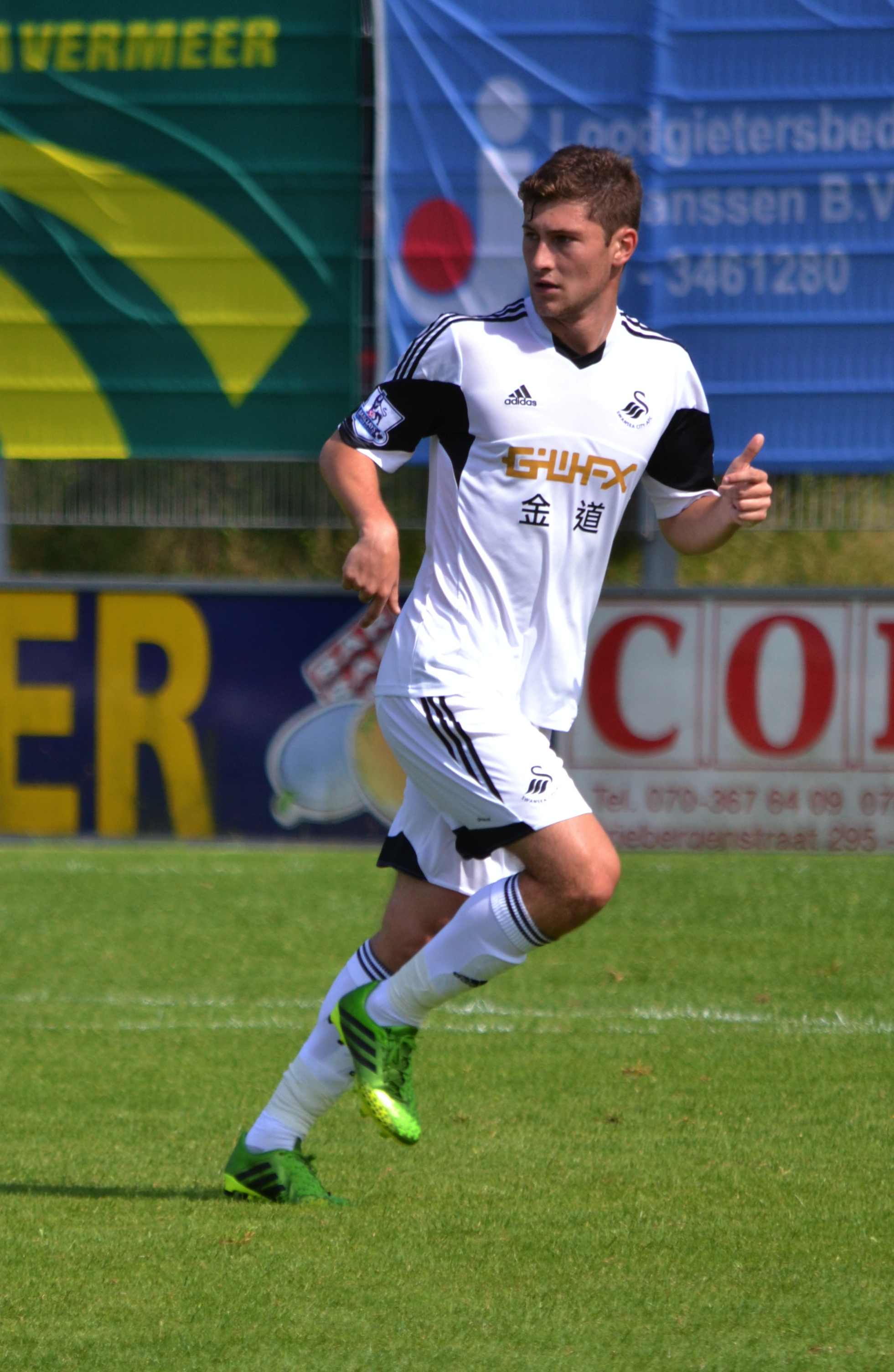
Davies playing for Swansea City in 2013

After spending time with the youth ranks, Davies signed a two-year contract with Swansea City, making his first-team debut against West Ham United for the Premier League on 25 August 2012, coming on as an 84th minute substitute for Neil Taylor in a 3–0 home win.

Davies became a regular starter for Swansea in the 2012–13 season, following a long-term injury to Taylor.

On 23 November 2012, Davies signed a new three-and-a-half-year contract with Swansea.

On 19 January 2013, Davies scored his first goal for Swansea against Stoke City in a 3–1 victory. In doing so, at 19 years and 270 days, he became Swansea's youngest scorer in the Premier League.

On 24 February 2013, Davies started at left-back in the 2013 Football League Cup final at Wembley Stadium, as the Swans beat Bradford City 5–0 to win the club's first major trophy.

In September 2013, he scored his second and third Premier League goals for Swansea, against West Bromwich Albion and Arsenal respectively.

On 24 December 2013, Davies signed a one-year contract extension with the Swans.

=== Tottenham Hotspur ===
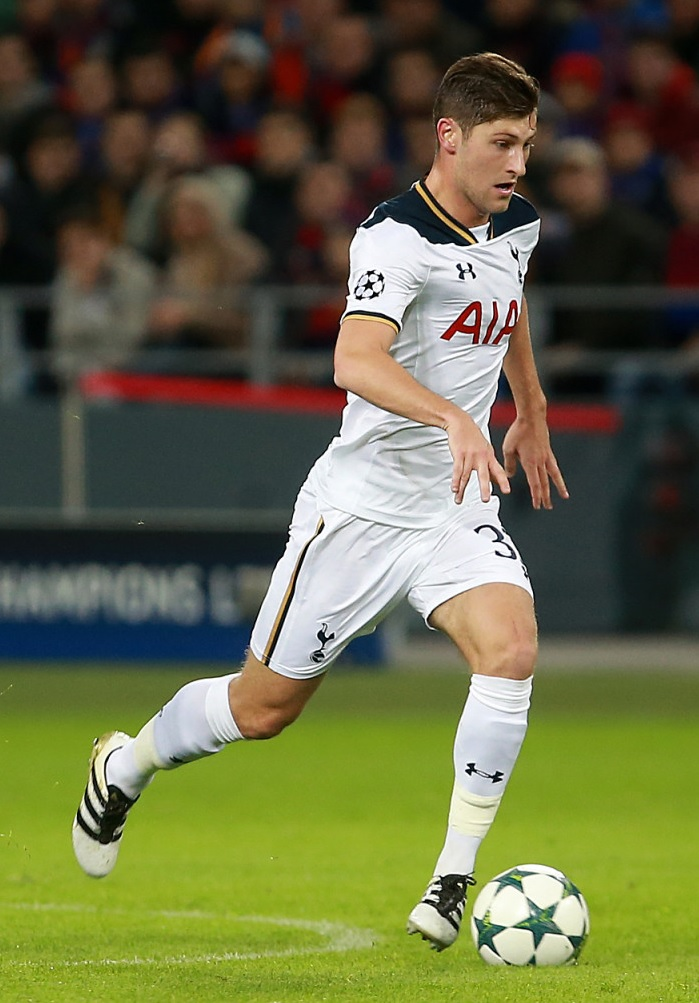
Davies playing for Tottenham Hotspur in 2016

On 23 July 2014, Davies joined Tottenham Hotspur on a five-year contract for an undisclosed fee. He joined on the same day as his Swansea teammate Michel Vorm, with Gylfi Sigurðsson being exchanged as part of the deal. Davies made his Premier League debut for Tottenham Hotspur as a late substitute in a 0–3 defeat to Liverpool. He made his first start for the club in the league in a 2–1 away win at Hull City on 23 November 2014. He was an unused substitute for the 2015 League Cup Final at Wembley Stadium on 1 March 2015, in which Tottenham were beaten 2–0 by Chelsea.

Davies scored his first goal for the club on 8 January 2017, a header in an FA Cup tie against Aston Villa. He signed a new four-year contract at Tottenham on 9 March 2017, extending his deal to 2021.

Davies scored his second Tottenham goal – and his first for them in the Premier League – against Hull City on the final day of the 2016–17 season; a first-time strike from outside the box into the top left corner added a sixth goal in an eventual 7–1 win for Tottenham.

Davies started for Tottenham in the opening match of the 2017–18 season, and scored a goal in a 2–0 win away to Newcastle United.

Davies signed a new 5-year contract with Tottenham in July 2019.

Davies scored his first goal of the 2020–21 season, his first in over three years, in the EFL Cup tie against Stoke City, helping the team win 3–1 to reach the semi-finals.

At the start of the 2021–22 season, Davies started only one Premier League game during Nuno Espírito Santo's brief tenure as head coach. He returned to being a regular starter under the management of Antonio Conte, who was hired as head coach in November 2021, playing as a left-sided centre-back in a back three.

Davies scored his first goal of the 2022–23 season in a league match against Bournemouth on 29 October, an equaliser in an eventual 3–2 comeback victory.

He scored his first goal of the 2023–24 season with a header from Pedro Porro's corner kick in a 4–2 defeat away to Brighton and Hove Albion on 28 December 2023.

On 8 June 2025, the club announced it had triggered a one-year extension to the player's contract.

He scored his first and only goal of the 2025–26 season from a corner in a 1–1 draw at home Sunderland on 4 January 2026. On 17 January 2026, Davies sustained a season-ending ankle injury in a 2–1 defeat at home to West Ham, for which he received surgery the following week.

On 10 June 2026, it was announced that Tottenham Hotspur had triggered a one-year contract extension, keeping Davies at the club until June 2027.

On 19 October 2026, Davies came off the bench to help seal Tottenham Hotspur’s first league win of the season, scoring the third in a 3-1 home victory over Coventry City F.C.

== International career ==
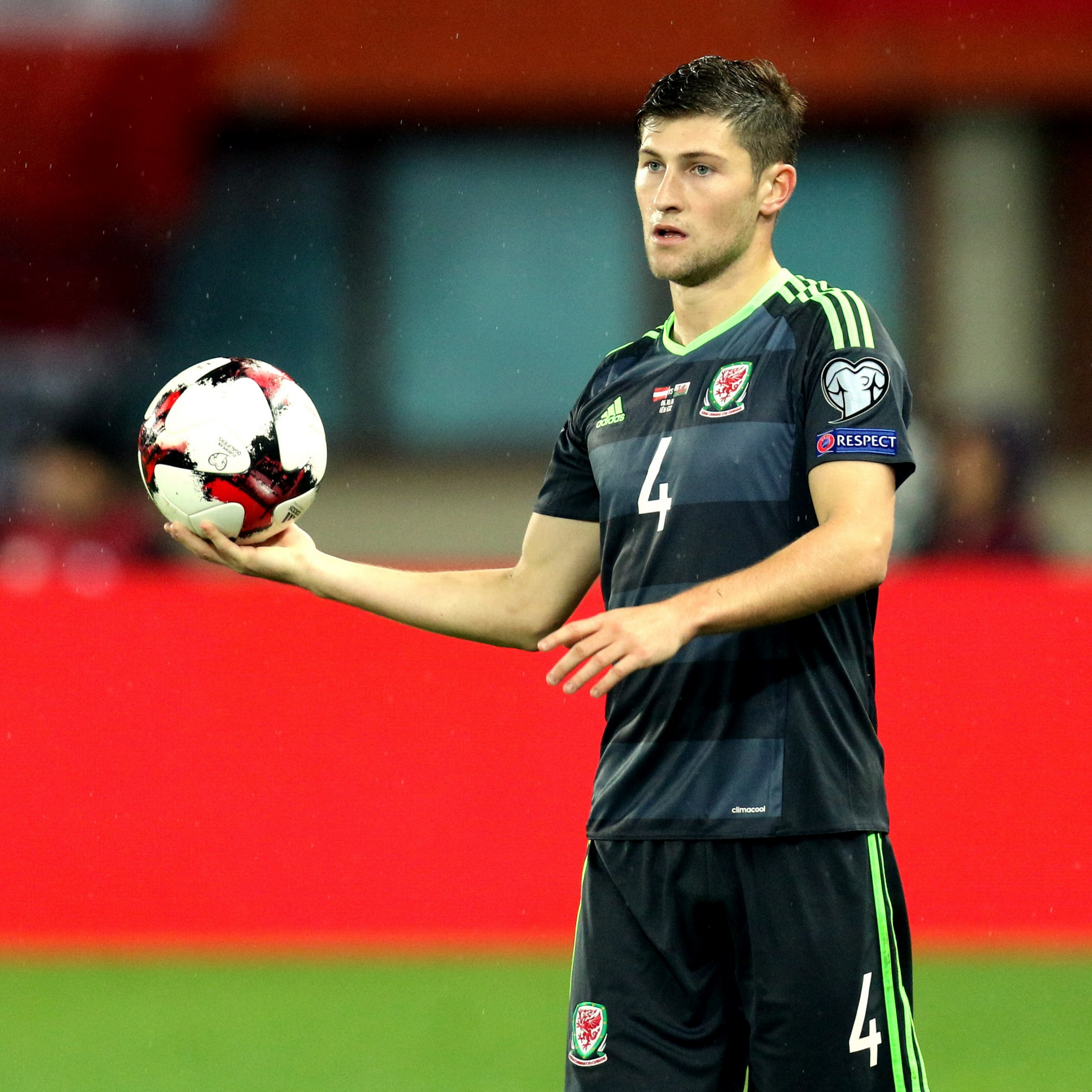
Davies playing for Wales in 2016

In September 2012, Davies was selected for the Wales squad for 2014 FIFA World Cup qualification matches in September 2012. He replaced club teammate Neil Taylor, who had suffered a broken ankle in a Premier League match against Sunderland. Davies made his full international debut in the 2–1 win against Scotland on 12 October 2012.

Davies was a member of the Wales side who qualified for UEFA Euro 2016, Wales' first tournament in 58 years. In Wales' opening match, Davies provided a crucial goal-line block after Marek Hamšík's shot passed goalkeeper Danny Ward, with Wales going on to win 2–1. Davies went on to start every match for Wales as they made a surprise run to the tournament semi-finals, losing to eventual champions Portugal. In May 2021 he was selected for the Wales squad for the delayed UEFA Euro 2020 tournament. In November 2022 he was named in the Wales squad for the 2022 FIFA World Cup in Qatar.

Following Gareth Bale's retirement in 2022 and Aaron Ramsey's promotion to captain, Davies was named vice captain of the national team, having first worn the armband in a friendly against England in 2020.

On 13 October 2025, he made his 100th international appearance in a 4–2 defeat against Belgium during the 2026 FIFA World Cup qualification.

== Outside football ==
In the summer of 2021, Davies was awarded a 2:1 degree in economics and business from the Open University, after balancing his studies with his job as a professional footballer over a period of five years. In September 2025, he graduated in the inaugural cohort of students from the PFA Business School, with an award from the University of Portsmouth.

Former Spurs team-mate Son Heung-min is the godfather to his children.

== Career statistics ==
=== Club ===
As of match played 24 October 2026

Appearances and goals by club, season and competition
Club	Season	League			FA Cup		League Cup		Europe		Other		Total	
Club	Season	Division	Apps	Goals	Apps	Goals	Apps	Goals	Apps	Goals	Apps	Goals	Apps	Goals
Swansea City	2012–13	Premier League	37	1	1	0	6	0	—		—		44	1
Swansea City	2013–14	Premier League	34	2	0	0	0	0	7 (Note: Appearances in UEFA Europa League)	0	—		41	2
Swansea City	Total		71	3	1	0	6	0	7	0	—		85	3
Tottenham Hotspur	2014–15	Premier League	14	0	2	0	4	0	9	0	—		29	0
Tottenham Hotspur	2015–16	Premier League	17	0	2	0	0	0	8	0	—		27	0
Tottenham Hotspur	2016–17	Premier League	23	1	4	1	2	0	5 (Note: Three appearances in UEFA Champions League, two appearances in UEFA Europa League)	0	—		34	2
Tottenham Hotspur	2017–18	Premier League	29	2	3	0	1	0	5 (Note: Appearance(s) in UEFA Champions League)	0	—		38	2
Tottenham Hotspur	2018–19	Premier League	27	0	1	0	3	0	9	0	—		40	0
Tottenham Hotspur	2019–20	Premier League	18	0	0	0	1	0	3	0	—		22	0
Tottenham Hotspur	2020–21	Premier League	20	0	3	0	2	1	13	0	—		38	1
Tottenham Hotspur	2021–22	Premier League	29	1	3	0	5	0	6 (Note: Appearances in UEFA Europa Conference League)	0	—		43	1
Tottenham Hotspur	2022–23	Premier League	31	2	2	0	0	0	7	0	—		40	2
Tottenham Hotspur	2023–24	Premier League	17	1	1	0	1	0	—		—		19	1
Tottenham Hotspur	2024–25	Premier League	17	0	0	0	3	0	8	0	—		28	0
Tottenham Hotspur	2025–26	Premier League	3	1	1	0	0	0	1	0	0	0	5	1
Tottenham Hotspur	2026–27	Premier League	2	1	0	0	1	1	—		—		3	2
Tottenham Hotspur	Total		247	9	22	1	23	2	74	0	0	0	366	12
Career total			318	12	23	1	29	2	81	0	0	0	451	15

=== International ===
As of match played 17 November 2026

Appearances and goals by national team and year
National team	Year	Apps	Goals
Wales	2012	2	0
Wales	2013	7	0
Wales	2014	3	0
Wales	2015	6	0
Wales	2016	10	0
Wales	2017	8	0
Wales	2018	7	0
Wales	2019	9	0
Wales	2020	6	0
Wales	2021	11	1
Wales	2022	8	0
Wales	2023	7	1
Wales	2024	8	0
Wales	2025	8	1
Wales	2026	6	0
Total		106	3

As of match played 13 October 2025. Wales' score listed first, score column indicates score after each Davies goal.

List of international goals scored by Ben Davies
No.	Date	Venue	Cap	Opponent	Score	Result	Competition
1	13 November 2021	Cardiff City Stadium, Cardiff, Wales	68	Belarus	4–0	5–1	2022 FIFA World Cup qualification
2	11 October 2023	Racecourse Ground, Wrexham, Wales	81	Gibraltar	1–0	4–0	Friendly
3	22 March 2025	Cardiff City Stadium, Cardiff, Wales	93	Kazakhstan	2–1	3–1	2026 FIFA World Cup qualification

== Honours ==
Swansea City

- Football League Cup: 2012–13

Tottenham Hotspur

- UEFA Europa League: 2024–25
- Football League/EFL Cup runner-up: 2014–15, 2020–21
- UEFA Champions League runner-up: 2018–19

== See also ==
- List of men's footballers with 100 or more international caps
