= 2011 Football League Championship play-off final =

Association football match in London

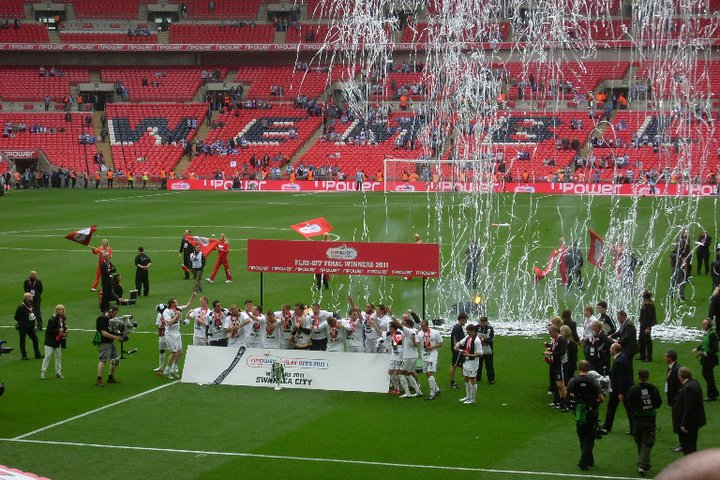
- Event: 2010–11 Football League Championship
Reading	Swansea City
2	4
- Date: 30 May 2011
- Venue: Wembley Stadium, London
- Man of the Match: Scott Sinclair (Swansea City)
- Referee: Phil Dowd
- Attendance: 86,581

The 2011 Football League Championship play-off final was an association football match which was played on 30 May 2011 at Wembley Stadium, London, between Swansea City and Reading. The match was to determine the third and final team to gain promotion from the Football League Championship, the second tier of English football, to the Premier League. The top two teams of the 2010–11 Football League Championship season gained automatic promotion to the Premier League, while the teams placed from third to sixth place in the table partook in play-off semi-finals; Swansea ended the season in third place while Reading had finished fifth. The winners of these semi-finals competed for the final place for the 2011–12 season in the Premier League. Winning the game was estimated to be worth up to £90 million to the successful team.

The 2011 final, refereed by Phil Dowd, was watched by a crowd of more than 86,000 people. Swansea took the lead in the first half with a Scott Sinclair penalty, who scored again a minute later. Before half-time, Stephen Dobbie added a third for a scoreline of 3–0. During half-time, Reading's Jay Tabb and their assistant manager were sent off for abusing the referee. An own goal early in the second half from Swansea's Joe Allen and a goal from Reading's Matt Mills made the score 3–2 but Sinclair completed his hat-trick, once again with a penalty, and Swansea won the match 4–2. It was their first top-tier play-off final win. Sinclair's hat-trick was the second in play-off final history, and he was named man of the match.

Swansea ended the next season in mid-table in the Premier League. Reading finished the following season as champions of the Football League Championship and were automatically promoted to the Premier League.

== Route to the final ==
Football League Championship final table, leading positions
Pos	Team	Pld	W	D	L	GF	GA	GD	Pts
1	Queens Park Rangers	46	24	16	6	71	32	+39	88
2	Norwich City	46	23	15	8	83	58	+25	84
3	Swansea City	46	24	8	14	69	42	+27	80
4	Cardiff City	46	23	11	12	76	54	+22	80
5	Reading	46	20	17	9	77	51	+26	77
6	Nottingham Forest	46	20	15	11	69	50	+19	75

Swansea City finished the regular 2010–11 season in third place in the Football League Championship, the second tier of the English football league system, two places and three points ahead of Reading. Both therefore missed out on the two automatic places for promotion to the Premier League and instead took part in the play-offs to determine the third promoted team. Swansea finished four points behind Norwich City (who were promoted in second place) and eight behind league winners Queens Park Rangers (QPR).

Reading faced Cardiff City in their play-off semi-final, the first leg of which took place at the Madejski Stadium. Michael Chopra came on for Cardiff's striker Craig Bellamy early in the first half who suffered a suspected hamstring strain, and after the break, Reading's Hal Robson-Kanu was replaced by Mathieu Manset, again through injury. Neither team dominated the match which had few chances, and ended 0–0. The second leg, at the Cardiff City Stadium, was played four days later. Shane Long put the visitors ahead midway through the first half, chipping Stephen Bywater, the Cardiff goalkeeper, from 20 yards (18 m). Long doubled his tally with a penalty on half time after Matt Mills was fouled by Dekel Keinan, and Jobi McAnuff scored a third, to secure a 3–0 aggregate win for Reading and qualification to the play-off final.

In the other play-off semi-final, Swansea City's opponents were Nottingham Forest, with the first leg being played at the City Ground. The Welsh side's defender Neil Taylor was sent off within two minutes for a foul on Lewis McGugan but despite having to play almost the whole game with ten men, Swansea held on for a 0–0 draw. The return leg took place four days later at the Liberty Stadium. Both sides hit the bar before Leon Britton's 25-yard (23 m) strike put Swansea into the lead. Five minutes later Stephen Dobbie doubled their lead, and while Robert Earnshaw struck back for Forest with twelve minutes remaining, a third goal, this time on the break, from Swansea's Darren Pratley in injury time sealed a 3–1 aggregate win and passage to the final.

Reading			Round	Swansea City
Opponent	Result	Legs	Semi-finals	Opponent	Result	Legs
Cardiff City	3–0	0–0 home; 3–0 away		Nottingham Forest	3–1	0–0 away; 3–1 home

== Match ==
=== Background ===
This was Swansea's first Championship play-off final, although they had lost in the third-tier final in 2006 on penalties to Barnsley at the Millennium Stadium in Cardiff. Reading had lost the 1995 Football League First Division play-off final against Bolton Wanderers at the old Wembley Stadium, and had failed to qualify for the final, losing out in the 2003 and 2009 play-off semi-finals. During the regular season, Swansea beat Reading both home and away, 1–0 on each occasion. Long was Reading's top scorer with 21 goals while Scott Sinclair led the scoring charts for Swansea with 19. The referee for the final was Phil Dowd, with assistant referees Scott Ledger and Simon Long, with Lee Mason acting as the fourth official.

The 2011 UEFA Champions League Final was scheduled to be held at Wembley Stadium on 28 May 2011, so alternative venues for all of the 2011 play-off finals were considered. Manchester United's Old Trafford had been confirmed as a possible alternative, while Arsenal's Emirates Stadium and the Millennium Stadium were also said to have been under consideration to host the play-off finals. It was subsequently confirmed that Wembley would host the Championship play-off final on 30 May, two days after the Champions League final, while Old Trafford would host the League One and League Two finals on 28 and 29 May respectively. Accountancy firm Deloitte calculated that the Championship play-off final would again be worth about £90 million to the winner, including more than £40 million of higher broadcast income, gate receipts and commercial income in the 2011–12 Premier League. Reading were looking to return to the Premier League after a three-year absence while Swansea had last played in England's top-flight in the 1982–83 season. A victory for them would have made them the first Welsh team to participate in the Premier League since its establishment in the 1992–93 season.

Jimmy Kébé returned to the Reading starting line-up having recovered from injury, with Shaun Cummings dropping to the bench. Kébé had scored nine goals and made seven assists, but a thigh injury had kept him out of the last six games. Swansea's starting eleven were unchanged from the team that had won the second semi-final leg against Nottingham Forest.

=== First half ===
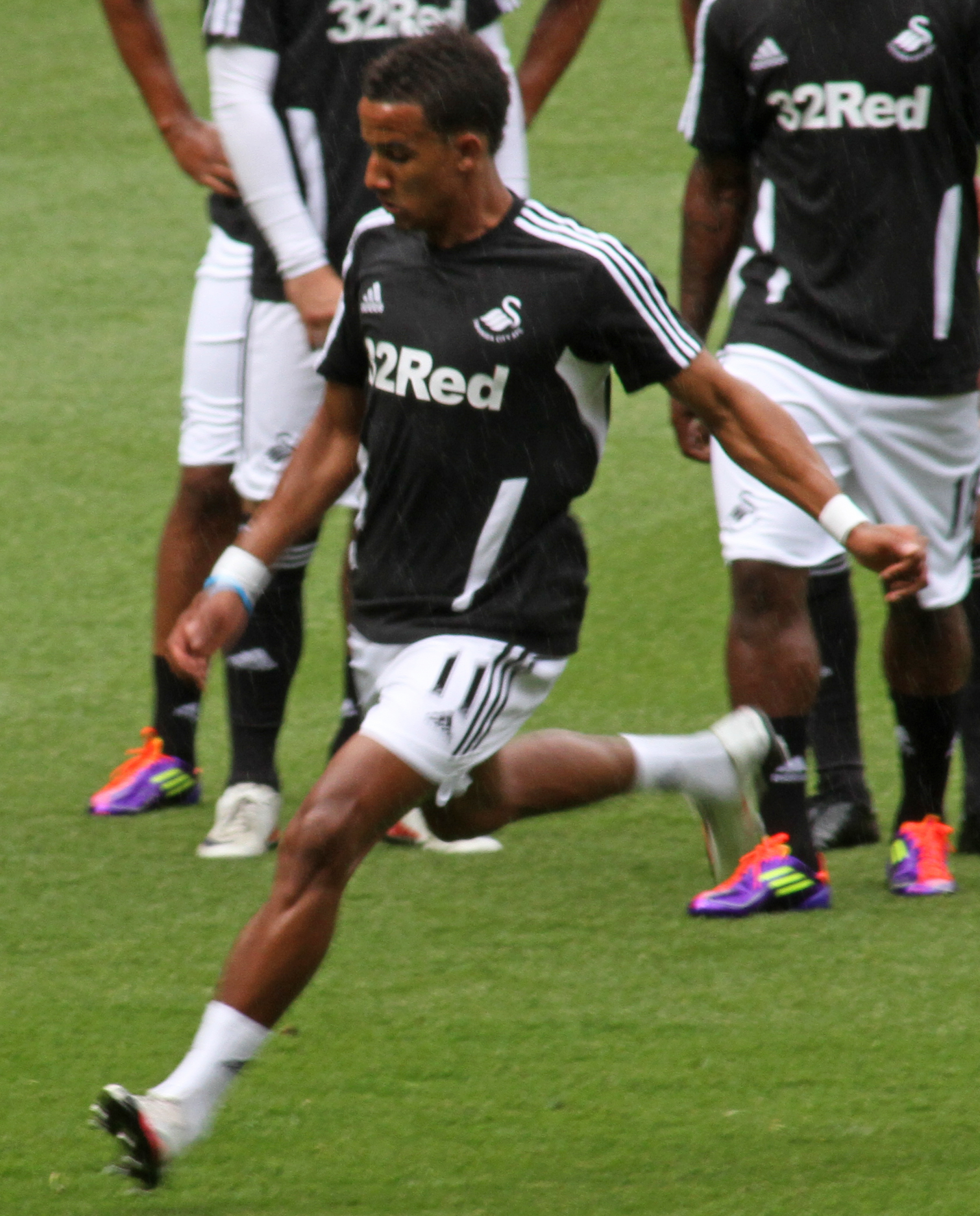
Scott Sinclair scored a hat-trick for Swansea, the first play-off final treble since 1998.

Reading kicked the game off around 3 p.m. in front of a Wembley crowd of 86,581. Kébé's early cross was dropped by the Swansea goalkeeper Dorus de Vries but was cleared by his defenders. Sinclair was then fouled, but the resulting free kick was struck high and wide of Adam Federici's goal by Fabio Borini. In the eighth minute, a foul on Sinclair by Andy Griffin saw him receive the first booking of the game from the referee Phil Dowd. Four minutes later, both Borini and Zurab Khizanishvili were also booked, this time for an altercation. In the 18th minute, a Jem Karacan attempt was deflected and three minutes later, Khizanishvili's challenge on Nathan Dyer in the box was deemed a foul. A penalty was awarded to Swansea which was scored by Sinclair. Immediately after the restart, Dobbie made a run down the right and passed to Sinclair, whose shot went in at the far post despite Federici getting a hand on it, making the score 2–0 after 22 minutes. Mills' shot for Reading was blocked and soon after a McAnuff corner was headed off-target by Noel Hunt. With about ten minutes of the half remaining, Sinclair passed to Borini, whose shot on the turn was defended by Mills. After a period of possession for Swansea, Reading had two corners with no end product before McAnuff was booked for a foul on Britton in the 39th minute. Within a minute, Swansea extended their lead to 3–0 – Khizanishvili failed to deal with Dyer's cross and Dobbie side-footed the ball past Federici. In the final minute of half, MacAnuff's cross was struck wide of an empty net from seven yards by Long. Into stoppage time, Mikele Leigertwood's shot from 22 yards was palmed down by de Vries, before Dowd brought the half to a close, with Swansea leading 3–0 at the break.

=== Second half ===
During the half-time interval, Dowd sent off Reading's Jay Tabb and their assistant manager Nigel Gibbs for abuse, disallowing them from watching the second half from the dug-out. Karacan's effort early in the second half was blocked before Reading were awarded a corner in the third minute. Hunt's header at the near post from McAnuff's cross was headed into his own net by the Swansea's Joe Allen, making it 3–1. Four minutes later, Allen was booked for a foul on Leigertwood, picking up the fifth yellow card of the game. Dobbie then struck wide with only the goalkeeper to beat before Mills scored from another McAnuff corner, reducing Reading's deficit to a single goal. Two minutes later, Karacan's strike hit the post and Garry Monk's block prevented Hunt from finishing the rebound. Each side made a substitution with around 15 minutes remaining, Simon Church replacing Hunt and Swansea's Mark Gower on for Britton. In the 80th minute, Swansea extended their lead with another Sinclair penalty, following a Griffin foul on Borini in the box. The strike completed Sinclair's hat-trick, just the second in play-off final history after Clive Mendonca's treble for Charlton Athletic against Sunderland in the 1998 Football League First Division play-off final. With six minutes remaining, Robson-Kanu came on for Griffin. Swansea retained possession and limited Reading's chances, and made their final substitution, Luke Moore coming on for Allen in the final moments of the game. Four minutes of additional time were indicated, in the last of which an unmarked Leigertwood headed over from a corner. The match ended 4–2 to Swansea who were promoted to the Premier League.

=== Details ===
30 May 2011
15:00 BST

Reading	2–4	Swansea City
Allen 49' (o.g.); Mills 57'	Report	Sinclair 21' (pen.), 22', 80' (pen.); Dobbie 40'

Wembley Stadium, London
Attendance: 86,581
Referee: Phil Dowd (Staffordshire)

Reading	Swansea City

GK	1	Adam Federici
RB	2	Andy Griffin	(yellow card) 8'	(substituted off) 84'
CB	5	Matt Mills (c)
CB	15	Zurab Khizanishvili	(yellow card) 12'
LB	23	Ian Harte
CM	4	Jem Karacan
CM	8	Mikele Leigertwood
RW	14	Jimmy Kébé
LW	11	Jobi McAnuff	(yellow card) 39'
CF	9	Shane Long
CF	10	Noel Hunt		(substituted off) 76'
Substitutes:
GK	41	Alex McCarthy
DF	24	Shaun Cummings
DF	26	Alex Pearce
MF	7	Jay Tabb	Red card
MF	19	Hal Robson-Kanu		(substituted on) 84'
MF	20	Brian Howard
FW	18	Simon Church		(substituted on) 76'
Manager:
Brian McDermott

GK	1	Dorus de Vries
RB	22	Àngel Rangel
CB	16	Garry Monk (c)
CB	2	Ashley Williams
LB	5	Alan Tate
CM	37	Leon Britton		(substituted off) 77'
CM	24	Joe Allen	(yellow card) 54'	(substituted off) 89'
RW	12	Nathan Dyer
AM	14	Stephen Dobbie		(substituted off) 55'
LW	21	Scott Sinclair
CF	15	Fabio Borini	(yellow card) 12'
Substitutes:
GK	25	Yves Ma-Kalambay
DF	17	Albert Serrán
MF	8	Darren Pratley		(substituted on) 55'
MF	27	Mark Gower	(yellow card) 82'	(substituted on) 77'
MF	29	Jazz Richards
FW	9	Craig Beattie
FW	19	Luke Moore		(substituted on) 89'
Manager:
Brendan Rodgers

Match officials:

- Assistant referees:
  - Scott Ledger
  - Simon Long
- Fourth official: Lee Mason
- Reserve referee: Andrew Halliday

Match rules:

- 90 minutes
- 30 minutes of extra time if necessary
- Penalty shoot-out if scores still level
- Seven named substitutes
- Maximum of three substitutions

=== Statistics ===
Statistics
	Reading	Swansea City
Total shots	19	6
Shots on target	11	4
Ball possession	47%	53%
Corner kicks	16	1
Fouls committed	18	4
Offsides	3	0
Yellow cards	3	3
Red cards	1	0

== Post-match ==
The Swansea manager Brendan Rodgers said: "It was a fantastic game, we didn't play as well as we have done for the rest of the season but in the moments we showed quality we were very good ... I think ourselves, Norwich and QPR will be a credit to the Championship." Monk, Swansea's captain, noted: "Reading came back at us, fair play to them ... But we held on." Sinclair was named as man of the match.

Swansea ended the next season in mid-table in the Premier League, in eleventh place and eleven points clear of the relegation zone. Reading finished the following season as champions of the Football League Championship place, one point ahead of Southampton, and were automatically promoted to the Premier League.
