= 2011–12 Swansea City A.F.C. season =

Swansea City
2011–12 season
- Chairman: Huw Jenkins
- Manager: Brendan Rodgers
- Stadium: Liberty Stadium
- Premier League: 11th
- FA Cup: 4th round
- League Cup: 2nd round
- Top goalscorer: League: Danny Graham (12 goals); All: Danny Graham (14 goals)
- Highest home attendance: 20,650 (13 May 2012 vs Liverpool)
- Lowest home attendance: 19,028 (20 August 2011 vs Wigan Athletic)
- Average home league attendance: 19,946
| Home colours | Away colours |

The 2011–12 season was Swansea City's third season in the first tier of English football, and their first return to top-flight football since 1983. During the 2010–11 season, Swansea finished in 3rd place and beat Reading 4–2 in the Championship play-off final, to win promotion to the Premier League. In doing so, they became the first Welsh team to enter the Premier League. Swansea finished the season at 11th place after beating Liverpool 1–0 in the last game of the season on 13 May 2012. Safety was already confirmed two weeks prior when the Swans drew 4–4 with Wolverhampton Wanderers on 28 April 2012, a game Swansea had led 4–1, although Andrea Orlandi posted the fastest goal of the season in that match.

== Players ==
=== Squad ===
Updated 13 May 2012.

Note: Flags indicate national team as defined under FIFA eligibility rules; some limited exceptions apply. Players may hold more than one non-FIFA nationality.

| No. | Pos. | Nation | Player |
|---|---|---|---|
| 1 | GK | NED | Michel Vorm |
| 2 | DF | WAL | Ashley Williams |
| 3 | DF | WAL | Neil Taylor |
| 5 | DF | ENG | Alan Tate (vice-captain) |
| 6 | MF | NED | Ferrie Bodde |
| 7 | MF | ENG | Leon Britton |
| 8 | MF | ESP | Andrea Orlandi |
| 10 | FW | ENG | Danny Graham |
| 11 | MF | ENG | Scott Sinclair |
| 12 | MF | ENG | Nathan Dyer |
| 13 | GK | WAL | David Cornell |
| 14 | FW | SCO | Stephen Dobbie |
| 15 | MF | ENG | Wayne Routledge |
| 16 | DF | ENG | Garry Monk (captain) |
| 18 | FW | ENG | Leroy Lita |
| 19 | FW | ENG | Luke Moore |
| 20 | DF | ARG | Federico Bessone |
| 21 | GK | POR | José Moreira |

| No. | Pos. | Nation | Player |
|---|---|---|---|
| 22 | DF | ESP | Àngel Rangel |
| 23 | DF | FRA | Darnel Situ |
| 24 | MF | WAL | Joe Allen |
| 25 | GK | GER | Gerhard Tremmel |
| 26 | MF | NED | Kemy Agustien |
| 27 | MF | ENG | Mark Gower |
| 28 | DF | ENG | Curtis Obeng |
| 29 | MF | WAL | Ashley Richards |
| 30 | MF | ENG | Scott Donnelly |
| 31 | MF | WAL | Lee Lucas |
| 33 | DF | WAL | Ben Davies |
| 34 | DF | WAL | Joe Walsh |
| 35 | DF | WAL | Daniel Alfei |
| 36 | FW | WAL | Casey Thomas |
| 37 | MF | WAL | Jordan Smith |
| 38 | MF | WAL | Gwion Edwards |
| 39 | MF | WAL | Kurtis March |
| 41 | FW | NIR | Rory Donnelly |

==== On loan players during the season ====
Note: Flags indicate national team as defined under FIFA eligibility rules; some limited exceptions apply. Players may hold more than one non-FIFA nationality.

| No. | Pos. | Nation | Player |
|---|---|---|---|
| 4 | DF | ENG | Steven Caulker (on loan from Tottenham Hotspur for the season) |
| 17 | MF | ENG | Josh McEachran (on loan from Chelsea for the season) |
| 42 | MF | ISL | Gylfi Sigurðsson (on loan from 1899 Hoffenheim for the season) |

== Transfers ==
=== Transfers in ===
| No. | Pos. | Nat. | Name | Age | EU | Moving from | Type | Transfer window | Ends | Transfer fee | Source |
|---|---|---|---|---|---|---|---|---|---|---|---|
| 1 | GK | (Netherlands) | Vorm | 27 | EU | Utrecht (Netherlands) | Transfer | Summer | August 2014 | £1,500,000 | |
| 10 | FW | (England) | Graham | 25 | EU | Watford | Transfer | Summer | June 2015 | £3,500,000 | |
| 15 | MF | (England) | Routledge | 26 | EU | Newcastle United | Transfer | Summer | August 2014 | Undisclosed fee | |
| 18 | FW | (England) | Lita | 26 | EU | Middlesbrough | Transfer | Summer | August 2014 | £1,750,000 | |
| 20 | DF | (Italy) (Argentina) | Bessone | 27 | EU | Leeds United | Transfer | Summer | August 2013 | Free | |
| 21 | GK | (Portugal) | Moreira | 29 | EU | Benfica (Portugal) | Transfer | Summer | July 2013 | Undisclosed fee | |
| 23 | DF | (France) | Situ | 34 | EU | Lens (France) | Transfer | Summer | August 2013 | £250,000 | |
| 25 | GK | (Germany) | Tremmel | 32 | EU | Free agent | Transfer | Summer | August 2013 | Free | |
| 28 | DF | (England) | Obeng | 22 | EU | Wrexham (Wales) | Transfer | Winter | June 2015 | Undisclosed fee | |
| 41 | FW | (Northern Ireland) | Donnelly | 19 | EU | Cliftonville (Northern Ireland) | Transfer | Winter | June 2015 | Undisclosed fee | |
| 44 | DF | (Greece) | Moras | 30 | EU | Free agent | Transfer | Mid-season | January 2012 | Free | |

=== Transfers out ===
| No. | Pos. | Nat. | Name | Age | EU | Moving to | Type | Transfer window | Transfer fee | Source |
|---|---|---|---|---|---|---|---|---|---|---|
| 1 | GK | (Netherlands) | de Vries | 30 | EU | Wolverhampton Wanderers | Transfer | Summer | Free | |
| 8 | MF | (England) | Pratley | 26 | EU | Bolton Wanderers | Out of contract | Summer | | |
| 9 | FW | (Scotland) | Beattie | 28 | EU | Heart of Midlothian (Scotland) | Mutual consent | Winter | | |
| 11 | FW | (Netherlands) | van der Gun | 32 | EU | Utrecht (Netherlands) | Out of contract | Summer | | |
| 17 | DF | (Spain) | Serrán | 26 | EU | AEK Larnaca (Cyprus) | Out of contract | Summer | | |
| 17 | DF | (Wales) | Cotterill | 24 | EU | Barnsley | Mutual consent | Winter | | |
| 18 | FW | (Spain) | Pintado | 33 | EU | AEK Larnaca (Cyprus) | Mutual consent | Summer | | |
| 20 | MF | (Wales) | MacDonald | 23 | EU | Bournemouth | Transfer | Summer | £80,000 | |
| 23 | MF | (England) | Harley | 26 | EU | Brighton & Hove Albion | Transfer | Summer | Undisclosed fee | |
| 25 | GK | (Belgium) (Democratic Republic of the Congo) | Ma-Kalambay | 25 | EU | Mechelen (Belgium) | Out of contract | Summer | | |
| 28 | MF | (Republic of Ireland) | Butler | 30 | EU | Free agent | Mutual consent | Winter | | |
| 33 | FW | (Wales) | Morgan | 22 | EU | Neath (Wales) | Out of contract | Summer | | |
| 38 | DF | (England) | Grimes | 20 | EU | Free agent | Out of contract | Summer | | |
| 44 | DF | (Greece) | Moras | 30 | EU | Cesena (Italy) | Out of contract | Winter | | |

=== Loans in ===
| No. | Pos. | Name | Country | Age | Loan club | Started | Ended | Start source | End source |
|---|---|---|---|---|---|---|---|---|---|
| 4 | DF | Caulker | (England) | 19 | Tottenham Hotspur | 1 July 2011 | 13 May 2012 | | |
| 17 | MF | McEachran | (England) | 18 | Chelsea | 16 January 2012 | 13 May 2012 | | |
| 42 | MF | Sigurðsson | (Iceland) | 22 | 1899 Hoffenheim | 2 January 2012 | 13 May 2012 | | |

Sources: For loan start source see "Start source". For loan end source see "End source".
EU = if holds or not a European Union passport; Country: when 2 flags, 1st flag = country that plays for internationally, 2nd flag = country of birth; No. = number on jersey; P = Position (for position name, pause mouse pointer on abbreviation); Name = Name on jersey (for more extensive name, pause mouse pointer on name); In/Out = In: The player came in on loan, Out: The player went out on loan; Loan club = the club that the player moved on loan to or the club that the player came from on loan; Started = the date when the player's loan started; Ended = the date when the player's loan ended.

=== Loans out ===
| No. | Pos. | Name | Country | Age | Loan club | Started | Ended | Start source | End source |
|---|---|---|---|---|---|---|---|---|---|
| 9 | FW | Beattie | (Scotland) | 27 | Watford | 24 October 2011 | 8 January 2012 | | |
| 13 | GK | Cornell | (Wales) | 20 | Hereford United | 19 August 2011 | 5 May 2012 | | |
| 14 | FW | Dobbie | (Scotland) | 29 | Blackpool | 22 March 2012 | 19 May 2012 | | |
| 30 | MF | Donnelly | (England) | 23 | Wycombe Wanderers | 13 June 2011 | 5 May 2012 | | |
| 31 | MF | Lucas | (Wales) | 19 | Burton Albion | 26 January 2012 | 5 May 2012 | | |
| 35 | DF | Alfei | (Wales) | 19 | Wrexham | 31 January 2012 | 7 May 2012 | | |
| 36 | FW | Thomas | (Wales) | 20 | Colchester United | 4 November 2011 | 2 January 2012 | | |

Sources: For loan start source see "Start source". For loan end source see "End source".
EU = if holds or not a European Union passport; Country: when 2 flags, 1st flag = country that plays for internationally, 2nd flag = country of birth; No. = number on jersey; P = Position (for position name, pause mouse pointer on abbreviation); Name = Name on jersey (for more extensive name, pause mouse pointer on name); In/Out = In: The player came in on loan, Out: The player went out on loan; Loan club = the club that the player moved on loan to or the club that the player came from on loan; Started = the date when the player's loan started; Ended = the date when the player's loan ended.

=== New contracts ===
| No. | Pos. | Nat. | Name | Age | Status | Contract length | Expiry date | Source |
|---|---|---|---|---|---|---|---|---|
| 2 | DF | (Wales) | Ashley Williams | 26 | Signed | 3 years | August 2014 | |
| 3 | DF | (Wales) | Neil Taylor | 22 | Signed | 4 years | July 2015 | |
| 5 | DF | (England) | Alan Tate | 28 | Signed | 2 years | July 2015 | |
| 6 | MF | (Netherlands) | Ferrie Bodde | 29 | Signed | 1 year | June 2012 | |
| 7 | MF | (England) | Leon Britton | 29 | Signed | 3-year | June 2015 | |
| 10 | MF | (Spain) | Andrea Orlandi | 26 | Signed | 1 year | July 2013 | |
| 12 | MF | (England) | Nathan Dyer | 23 | Signed | 3 years | August 2014 | |
| 16 | DF | (England) | Garry Monk | 32 | Signed | 3 years | August 2014 | |
| 22 | DF | (Spain) | Àngel Rangel | 28 | Signed | 3 years | June 2014 | |
| 24 | MF | (Wales) | Joe Allen | 21 | Signed | 4 years | August 2015 | |
| 27 | MF | (England) | Mark Gower | 33 | Signed | 1 year | June 2013 | |
| 28 | MF | (Republic of Ireland) | Thomas Butler | 30 | Signed | 1 year | July 2012 | |
| 29 | MF | (Wales) | Jazz Richards | 20 | Signed | 1.5 years | June 2013 | |
| 26 | MF | (Netherlands) | Kemy Agustien | 25 | Signed | 2 years | June 2014 | |
| 31 | MF | (Wales) | Lee Lucas | 20 | Signed | 3 years | June 2015 | |
| 38 | MF | (Wales) | Gwion Edwards | 19 | Signed | 3 years | June 2015 | |

== Season statistics ==
=== Premier League table ===
| Pos | Team | Pld | W | D | L | GF | GA | GD | Pts |
|---|---|---|---|---|---|---|---|---|---|
| 9 | Fulham | 38 | 14 | 10 | 14 | 48 | 51 | −3 | 52 |
| 10 | West Bromwich Albion | 38 | 13 | 8 | 17 | 45 | 52 | −7 | 47 |
| 11 | Swansea City | 38 | 12 | 11 | 15 | 44 | 51 | −7 | 47 |
| 12 | Norwich City | 38 | 12 | 11 | 15 | 52 | 66 | −14 | 47 |
| 13 | Sunderland | 38 | 11 | 12 | 15 | 45 | 46 | −1 | 45 |

Source: Barclays Premier League
Rules for classification: 1) points; 2) goal difference; 3) number of goals scored.

=== Results summary ===
| Overall | | | | | | | | Home | | | | | | Away | | | | | |
| Pld | W | D | L | GF | GA | GD | Pts | W | D | L | GF | GA | GD | W | D | L | GF | GA | GD |
|---|---|---|---|---|---|---|---|---|---|---|---|---|---|---|---|---|---|---|---|
| 38 | 12 | 11 | 15 | 44 | 51 | −7 | 47 | 8 | 7 | 4 | 27 | 18 | +9 | 4 | 4 | 11 | 17 | 33 | −16 |

Last updated: 2012.
Source: swanseacity.net

=== League performance ===
| Round | 1 | 2 | 3 | 4 | 5 | 6 | 7 | 8 | 9 | 10 | 11 | 12 | 13 | 14 | 15 | 16 | 17 | 18 | 19 | 20 | 21 | 22 | 23 | 24 | 25 | 26 | 27 | 28 | 29 | 30 | 31 | 32 | 33 | 34 | 35 | 36 | 37 | 38 |
|---|---|---|---|---|---|---|---|---|---|---|---|---|---|---|---|---|---|---|---|---|---|---|---|---|---|---|---|---|---|---|---|---|---|---|---|---|---|---|
| Ground | A | H | H | A | H | A | H | A | A | H | A | H | H | A | H | A | A | H | H | A | H | A | H | A | H | A | A | H | A | H | A | H | A | H | A | H | A | H |
| Result | L | D | D | L | W | L | W | L | D | W | D | L | D | L | W | D | L | D | D | W | W | L | D | W | L | L | W | W | W | L | L | L | L | W | D | D | L | W |
| Position | 20 | 16 | 15 | 19 | 14 | 16 | 10 | 13 | 15 | 10 | 10 | 13 | 13 | 15 | 11 | 12 | 14 | 14 | 15 | 12 | 10 | 13 | 14 | 10 | 11 | 14 | 14 | 11 | 8 | 10 | 11 | 14 | 14 | 12 | 12 | 12 | 12 | 11 |

Updated to match(es) played on 13 May 2012. Source: swanseacity.net
A = Away; H = Home; W = Win; D = Draw; L = Loss

== Statistics ==
=== Goals and appearances ===
As of 13 May 2012

| No. | Pos. | Name | League | | FA Cup | | League Cup | | Total | | Discipline | |
| No. | Pos. | Name | Apps | Goals | Apps | Goals | Apps | Goals | Apps | Goals | Yellow card | Red card |
|---|---|---|---|---|---|---|---|---|---|---|---|---|
| 1 | GK | (Netherlands) Michel Vorm | 37 | 0 | 0 | 0 | 0 | 0 | 37 | 0 | 2 | 0 |
| 2 | DF | (Wales) Ashley Williams | 37 | 1 | 2 | 0 | 1 | 0 | 40 | 1 | 6 | 0 |
| 3 | DF | (Wales) Neil Taylor | 35(1) | 0 | 1 | 0 | 0(1) | 0 | 36(2) | 0 | 5 | 0 |
| 4 | DF | (England) Steven Caulker | 26 | 0 | 0 | 0 | 0 | 0 | 26 | 0 | 2 | 0 |
| 5 | DF | (England) Alan Tate | 1(4) | 0 | 0 | 0 | 1 | 0 | 2(4) | 0 | 0 | 0 |
| 6 | DF | (Netherlands) Ferrie Bodde | 0 | 0 | 0 | 0 | 0 | 0 | 0 | 0 | 0 | 0 |
| 7 | MF | (England) Leon Britton | 35(1) | 0 | 1 | 0 | 0 | 0 | 36(1) | 0 | 3 | 0 |
| 8 | MF | (Spain) Andrea Orlandi | 2(1) | 1 | 1 | 0 | 1 | 0 | 4(1) | 1 | 1 | 0 |
| 10 | FW | (England) Danny Graham | 32(4) | 12 | 1(1) | 2 | 1 | 0 | 34(5) | 14 | 0 | 0 |
| 11 | MF | (England) Scott Sinclair | 35(3) | 8 | 0(1) | 0 | 0(1) | 0 | 35(5) | 8 | 1 | 0 |
| 12 | MF | (England) Nathan Dyer | 29(5) | 5 | 1(1) | 1 | 0 | 0 | 30(6) | 6 | 1 | 1 |
| 14 | FW | (Scotland) Stephen Dobbie | 2(6) | 0 | 0 | 0 | 0(1) | 0 | 2(7) | 0 | 0 | 0 |
| 15 | MF | (England) Wayne Routledge | 17(11) | 1 | 2 | 0 | 0 | 0 | 19(11) | 1 | 2 | 0 |
| 16 | MF | (England) Garry Monk | 14(2) | 0 | 2 | 0 | 0 | 0 | 16(2) | 0 | 3 | 0 |
| 17 | MF | (England) Josh McEachran | 1(3) | 0 | 1 | 0 | 0 | 0 | 2(3) | 0 | 0 | 0 |
| 18 | FW | (England) Leroy Lita | 4(12) | 2 | 1 | 0 | 1 | 0 | 6(12) | 2 | 1 | 0 |
| 19 | FW | (England) Luke Moore | 3(17) | 2 | 1 | 1 | 1 | 0 | 5(17) | 3 | 1 | 0 |
| 20 | DF | (Argentina) Federico Bessone | 0(1) | 0 | 1 | 0 | 0 | 0 | 1(1) | 0 | 0 | 0 |
| 21 | GK | (Portugal) José Moreira | 0 | 0 | 0 | 0 | 1 | 0 | 1 | 0 | 0 | 0 |
| 22 | DF | (Spain) Àngel Rangel | 32(2) | 0 | 1 | 1 | 0 | 0 | 33(2) | 1 | 4 | 0 |
| 23 | DF | (France) Darnel Situ | 0 | 0 | 0 | 0 | 0 | 0 | 0 | 0 | 0 | 0 |
| 24 | MF | (Wales) Joe Allen | 31(5) | 4 | 0(2) | 0 | 0 | 0 | 31(7) | 4 | 3 | 1 |
| 25 | GK | (Germany) Gerhard Tremmel | 1 | 0 | 2 | 0 | 0 | 0 | 3 | 0 | 0 | 0 |
| 26 | MF | (Netherlands) Kemy Agustien | 7(6) | 0 | 2 | 0 | 0 | 0 | 9(6) | 0 | 3 | 0 |
| 27 | MF | (England) Mark Gower | 14(6) | 0 | 1 | 0 | 1 | 0 | 16(6) | 0 | 2 | 0 |
| 28 | DF | (England) Curtis Obeng | 0 | 0 | 0 | 0 | 0 | 0 | 0 | 0 | 0 | 0 |
| 29 | MF | (Wales) Ashley Richards | 6(2) | 0 | 1 | 0 | 0 | 0 | 7(2) | 0 | 4 | 0 |
| 31 | MF | (Wales) Lee Lucas | 0 | 0 | 0 | 0 | 0 | 0 | 0 | 0 | 0 | 0 |
| 33 | MF | (Wales) Ben Davies | 0 | 0 | 0 | 0 | 0 | 0 | 0 | 0 | 0 | 0 |
| 34 | DF | (Wales) Joe Walsh | 0 | 0 | 0 | 0 | 1 | 0 | 1 | 0 | 0 | 0 |
| 35 | DF | (Wales) Daniel Alfei | 0 | 0 | 0 | 0 | 1 | 0 | 1 | 0 | 0 | 0 |
| 36 | FW | (Wales) Casey Thomas | 0 | 0 | 0 | 0 | 0 | 0 | 0 | 0 | 0 | 0 |
| 37 | MF | (Wales) Jordan Smith | 0 | 0 | 0 | 0 | 0 | 0 | 0 | 0 | 0 | 0 |
| 38 | MF | (Wales) Gwion Edwards | 0 | 0 | 0 | 0 | 0 | 0 | 0 | 0 | 0 | 0 |
| 39 | MF | (Wales) Kurtis March | 0 | 0 | 0 | 0 | 0 | 0 | 0 | 0 | 0 | 0 |
| 41 | FW | (Northern Ireland) Rory Donnelly | 0 | 0 | 0 | 0 | 0 | 0 | 0 | 0 | 0 | 0 |
| 42 | MF | (Iceland) Gylfi Sigurðsson | 17(1) | 7 | 0(1) | 0 | 0 | 0 | 17(2) | 7 | 0 | 0 |

==== Left club mid-season ====
| No. | Pos. | Name | League | | FA Cup | | League Cup | | Total | | Discipline | |
| No. | Pos. | Name | Apps | Goals | Apps | Goals | Apps | Goals | Apps | Goals | Yellow card | Red card |
|---|---|---|---|---|---|---|---|---|---|---|---|---|
| 9 | FW | (Scotland) Craig Beattie | 0 | 0 | 0 | 0 | 0 | 0 | 0 | 0 | 0 | 0 |
| 17 | MF | (Wales) David Cotterill | 0 | 0 | 0 | 0 | 0 | 0 | 0 | 0 | 0 | 0 |
| 28 | MF | (Republic of Ireland) Thomas Butler | 0 | 0 | 0 | 0 | 0 | 0 | 0 | 0 | 0 | 0 |
| 44 | DF | (Greece) Vangelis Moras | 0(1) | 0 | 0 | 0 | 0 | 0 | 0(1) | 0 | 0 | 0 |

=== Top scorers ===
Includes all competitive matches. The list is sorted by shirt number when total goals are equal.

| R | No. | Pos | Nat | Name | Premier League | FA Cup | League Cup | Total |
|---|---|---|---|---|---|---|---|---|
| 1 | 10 | FW | (England) | Danny Graham | 12 | 2 | 0 | 14 |
| 2 | 11 | LW | (England) | Scott Sinclair | 8 | 0 | 0 | 8 |
| 3 | 42 | MF | (Iceland) | Gylfi Sigurðsson | 7 | 0 | 0 | 7 |
| 4 | 12 | RW | (England) | Nathan Dyer | 5 | 1 | 0 | 6 |
| 5 | 24 | MF | (Wales) | Joe Allen | 4 | 0 | 0 | 4 |
| 6 | 19 | FW | (England) | Luke Moore | 2 | 1 | 0 | 3 |
| 7 | 18 | FW | (England) | Leroy Lita | 2 | 0 | 0 | 2 |
| 8 | 2 | CB | (Wales) | Ashley Williams | 1 | 0 | 0 | 1 |
| = | 8 | LW | (Spain) | Andrea Orlandi | 1 | 0 | 0 | 1 |
| = | 15 | MF | (England) | Wayne Routledge | 1 | 0 | 0 | 1 |
| = | 22 | FB | (Spain) | Àngel Rangel | 0 | 1 | 0 | 1 |
| | | | | Own goals | 1 | 0 | 1 | 2 |
| | | | | Totals | 44 | 5 | 1 | 50 |

Last updated: 13 May 2012
Source: Statistics from premierleague.com

=== Captains ===
Accounts for the Premier League only.

| No. | Pos. | Name | Starts |
|---|---|---|---|
| 2 | CB | (Wales) Ashley Williams | 23 |
| 16 | CB | (England) Garry Monk | 14 |
| 5 | CB | (England) Alan Tate | 1 |

=== Starting formations ===
Accounts for Premier League formations only.

| Qnt | Formation | Match(es) |
|---|---|---|
| 37 | 4–3–3 | 1–35, 37, 38 |
| 1 | 3–4–3 | 36 |

Only competitive matches.

== Fixtures & results ==
=== Pre-season friendlies ===
| 16 July 2011 Friendly | Neath (Wales) | 1–0 | Swansea City | Neath |
| 12:00 BST | Jones 44' (pen.) | Report | | Stadium: The Gnoll |

| 16 July 2011 Friendly | Port Talbot Town (Wales) | 1–3 | Swansea City | Port Talbot |
| 15:00 BST | Rose 51' | Report | Beattie 11'; Rangel 36'; March 59' | Stadium: Genquip Stadium; Attendance: 2,100 |

| 23 July 2011 Friendly | Afan Lido (Wales) | 0–2 | Swansea City | Aberavon |
| 15:00 BST | | Report | Beattie 16'; Lucas 27' | Stadium: Marston Stadium; Attendance: 3,200 |

| 27 July 2011 Friendly | Swansea City | 3–1 | (Azerbaijan) FC Inter Baku | Bischofshofen, Austria |
| 18:15 BST | Sinclair 47'; Dyer 54'; Moore (?) | Report | Shahriyar (?) |

| 31 July 2011 Friendly | Swansea City | 0–1 | United Arab Emirates' Olympic team | Flachau, Austria |
| 16:00 BST | | Report | Abdulrahman 16' | Referee: Martin Ston |

| 3 August 2011 Friendly | Swansea City | 2–0 | (Scotland) Celtic | Swansea |
| 19:00 BST | Rangel 64'; Dobbie 85' | Report | | Stadium: Liberty Stadium; Attendance: 7,804; Referee: Mark Whitby |

| 6 August 2011 Friendly | Swansea City | 1–0 | (Spain) Real Betis | Swansea |
| 15:00 BST | Graham 64' | Report | | Stadium: Liberty Stadium; Referee: Huw Jones |

=== Mid-season friendlies ===
| 6 October 2011 Friendly | Llanelli (Wales) | 0–3 | Swansea City | Llanelli |
| 19:45 BST | | Report | Moras 10'; Gower 27'; Beattie 65' | Stadium: Stebonheath Park; Attendance: 387; Referee: Dean John |

=== Premier League ===
| 15 August 2011 1 | Manchester City | 4–0 | Swansea City | Manchester |
| 20:00 BST | Džeko 57'; Agüero 67', 90+1'; Silva 71' | Report | | Stadium: Etihad Stadium; Attendance: 46,802; Referee: Mike Dean |

| 20 August 2011 2 | Swansea City | 0–0 | Wigan Athletic | Swansea |
| 15:00 BST | | Report | McCarthy (yellow card) 18'; Gómez (yellow card) 25'; Moses (yellow card) 76' | Stadium: Liberty Stadium; Attendance: 19,028; Referee: Phil Dowd |

| 27 August 2011 3 | Swansea City | 0–0 | Sunderland | Swansea |
| 15:00 BST | Agustien (yellow card) 59' | Report | Gardner (yellow card) 83' | Stadium: Liberty Stadium; Attendance: 19,938; Referee: Mark Halsey |

| 10 September 2011 4 | Arsenal | 1–0 | Swansea City | London |
| 15:00 BST | Arshavin 40'; Walcott (yellow card) 49'; Koscielny (yellow card) 53'; Arteta (yellow card) 78' | Report | Agustien (yellow card) 25'; Caulker (yellow card) 68' | Stadium: Emirates Stadium; Attendance: 60,087; Referee: Stuart Attwell |

| 17 September 2011 5 | Swansea City | 3–0 | West Bromwich Albion | Swansea |
| 15:00 BST | Sinclair 14' (pen.); Lita 24' (yellow card) 24'; Dyer 49' | Report | Brunt (yellow card) 28'; Odemwingie (yellow card) 78' | Stadium: Liberty Stadium; Attendance: 20,341; Referee: Martin Atkinson |

| 24 September 2011 6 | Chelsea | 4–1 | Swansea City | London |
| 15:00 BST | Torres 29' (red card) 39'; Mata (yellow card) 33'; Ramires 36', 76'; Cole (yellow card) 86'; Mikel (yellow card) 90+4'; Drogba 90+4' | Report | Dyer (yellow card) 54'; Monk (yellow card) 76'; Williams 86'; Taylor (yellow card) 89' | Stadium: Stamford Bridge; Attendance: 41,800; Referee: Mike Dean |

| 2 October 2011 7 | Swansea City | 2–0 | Stoke City | Swansea |
| 15:00 BST | Sinclair 9' (pen.); Gower (yellow card) 54'; Taylor (yellow card) 59'; Routledge (yellow card) 60'; Graham 85' | Report | Whelan (yellow card) 19'; Wilkinson (yellow card) 40'; Crouch (yellow card) 45'; Pennant (yellow card) 76'; Shotton (yellow card) 88' | Stadium: Liberty Stadium; Attendance: 19,523; Referee: Mike Jones |

| 15 October 2011 8 | Norwich City | 3–1 | Swansea City | Norwich |
| 15:00 BST | Pilkington 1', 63'; R. Martin 10' | Report | Monk (yellow card) 4'; Graham 12' | Stadium: Carrow Road; Attendance: 26,567; Referee: Jonathan Moss |

| 22 October 2011 9 | Wolverhampton Wanderers | 2–2 | Swansea City | Wolverhampton |
| 12:45 BST | Stearman (yellow card) 46'; O'Hara (yellow card) 65' (goal) 86'; Doyle 84' | Report | Graham 24'; Allen 35' | Stadium: Molineux Stadium; Attendance: 25,216; Referee: Michael Oliver |

| 29 October 2011 10 | Swansea City | 3–1 | Bolton Wanderers | Swansea |
| 15:00 BST | Allen 49'; Britton (yellow card) 50'; Sinclair 57' (pen.); Rangel (yellow card) 82'; Gower (yellow card) 90'; Graham 90+3' | Report | Pratley (yellow card) 42'; Gardner (yellow card) 45' (yellow-red card) 48'; Robinson (yellow card) 59'; M. Davies (yellow card) 70'; Graham 73' (o.g.) | Stadium: Liberty Stadium; Attendance: 19,477; Referee: Mark Clattenburg |

| 5 November 2011 11 | Liverpool | 0–0 | Swansea City | Liverpool |
| 15:00 GMT | Adam (yellow card) 13'; Agger (yellow card) 67' | Report | Taylor (yellow card) 56'; Williams (yellow card) 82' | Stadium: Anfield; Attendance: 45,013; Referee: Phil Dowd |

| 19 November 2011 12 | Swansea City | 0–1 | Manchester United | Swansea |
| 17:30 GMT | | Report | Hernández 11'; Evra (yellow card) 47' | Stadium: Liberty Stadium; Attendance: 20,295; Referee: Mike Dean |

| 27 November 2011 13 | Swansea City | 0–0 | Aston Villa | Swansea |
| 13:30 GMT | Sinclair (yellow card) 8'; Richards (yellow card) 42'; Monk (yellow card) 67' | Report | Delph (yellow card) 3'; Hutton (yellow card) 14'; Dunne (yellow card) 37'; Collins (yellow card) 90+3' | Stadium: Liberty Stadium; Attendance: 20,404; Referee: Neil Swarbrick |

| 3 December 2011 14 | Blackburn Rovers | 4–2 | Swansea City | Blackburn |
| 15:00 GMT | Yakubu 20', 45+2', 57', 82' (pen.); Hoilett (yellow card) 44' | Report | Lita 35'; Moore 66'; Allen (yellow card) 59' (yellow-red card) 81' | Stadium: Ewood Park; Attendance: 23,080; Referee: Chris Foy |

| 10 December 2011 15 | Swansea City | 2–0 | Fulham | Swansea |
| 15:00 GMT | Sinclair 56'; Vorm (yellow card) 87'; Graham 90+1' | Report | Senderos (yellow card) 82' | Stadium: Liberty Stadium; Attendance: 19,296; Referee: Jonathan Moss |

| 17 December 2011 16 | Newcastle United | 0–0 | Swansea City | Newcastle upon Tyne |
| 15:00 GMT | Cabaye (yellow card) 62' | Report | Richards (yellow card) 84' | Stadium: St James' Park; Attendance: 51,767; Referee: Lee Mason |

| 21 December 2011 17 | Everton | 1–0 | Swansea City | Liverpool |
| 20:00 GMT | Osman 60'; Gueye (yellow card) 76' | Report | Williams (yellow card) 40'; Routledge (yellow card) 69' | Stadium: Goodison Park; Attendance: 32,004; Referee: Kevin Friend |

| 27 December 2011 18 | Swansea City | 1–1 | Queens Park Rangers | Swansea |
| 17:00 GMT | Graham 14'; Richards (yellow card) 42' | Report | Hill (yellow card) 35'; Mackie 58'; Barton (yellow card) 65'; Taarabt (yellow card) 90+1' | Stadium: Liberty Stadium; Attendance: 19,530; Referee: Lee Probert |

| 31 December 2011 19 | Swansea City | 1–1 | Tottenham Hotspur | Swansea |
| 15:00 GMT | Richards (yellow card) 15'; Sinclair 84' | Report | Bale (yellow card) 41' van der Vaart 44'; Livermore (yellow card) 88' | Stadium: Liberty Stadium; Attendance: 20,393; Referee: Phil Dowd |

| 2 January 2012 20 | Aston Villa | 0–2 | Swansea City | Birmingham |
| 15:00 GMT | Collins (yellow card) 40'; Dunne (yellow card) 59' | Report | Dyer 4'; Caulker (yellow card) 18'; Agustien (yellow card) 34'; Routledge 47'; Orlandi (yellow card) 57'; Vorm (yellow card) 90+1' | Stadium: Villa Park; Attendance: 35,642; Referee: Anthony Taylor |

| 15 January 2012 21 | Swansea City | 3–2 | Arsenal | Swansea |
| 16:00 GMT | Sinclair 16' (pen.); Dyer 57'; Graham 70' | Report | van Persie 5'; Walcott 69' | Stadium: Liberty Stadium; Attendance: 20,409; Referee: Michael Oliver |

| 21 January 2012 22 | Sunderland | 2–0 | Swansea City | Sunderland |
| 15:00 GMT | Sessègnon 14'; Gardner 85' | Report | | Stadium: Stadium of Light; Attendance: 36,904; Referee: Chris Foy |

| 31 January 2012 23 | Swansea City | 1–1 | Chelsea | Swansea |
| 19:45 GMT | Taylor (yellow card) 14'; Sinclair 39'; Rangel (yellow card) 48' | Report | Malouda (yellow card) 45+2'; Cole (yellow card) 45' (yellow-red card) 86'; Meireles (yellow card) 87'; Taylor 90+3' (o.g.) | Stadium: Liberty Stadium; Attendance: 20,526; Referee: Andre Marriner |

| 4 February 2012 24 | West Bromwich Albion | 1–2 | Swansea City | West Bromwich |
| 15:00 GMT | Fortuné 54'; Morrison (yellow card) 79'; Shorey (yellow card) 90' | Report | Britton (yellow card) 43'; Sigurðsson 55'; Graham 59' | Stadium: The Hawthorns; Attendance: 24,274; Referee: Jonathan Moss |

| 11 February 2012 25 | Swansea City | 2–3 | Norwich City | Swansea |
| 15:00 GMT | Graham 23', 87' (pen.) | Report | Drury (yellow card) 43'; Holt 47', 63' (yellow card) 64'; Pilkington 51' | Stadium: Liberty Stadium; Attendance: 19,927; Referee: Martin Atkinson |

| 26 February 2012 26 | Stoke City | 2–0 | Swansea City | Stoke-on-Trent |
| 15:00 GMT | Upson 24'; Shawcross (yellow card) 27'; Crouch 39' | Report | | Stadium: Britannia Stadium; Attendance: 26,678; Referee: Howard Webb |

| 3 March 2012 27 | Wigan Athletic | 0–2 | Swansea City | Wigan |
| 15:00 GMT | Gómez (yellow card) 57'; Diamé (yellow card) 70' | Report | Sigurðsson 45+2', 54'; Dyer (red card) 61'; Rangel (yellow card) 64'; Williams (yellow card) 70' | Stadium: DW Stadium; Attendance: 19,001; Referee: Andre Marriner |

| 11 March 2012 28 | Swansea City | 1–0 | Manchester City | Swansea |
| 14:00 GMT | Moore 83' | Report | de Jong (yellow card) 18'; Balotelli (yellow card) 75' | Stadium: Liberty Stadium; Attendance: 20,510; Referee: Lee Mason |

| 17 March 2012 29 | Fulham | 0–3 | Swansea City | Fulham |
| 15:00 GMT | | Report | Sigurðsson 36', 66'; Allen 77' | Stadium: Craven Cottage; Attendance: 25,690; Referee: Mark Halsey |

| 24 March 2012 30 | Swansea City | 0–2 | Everton | Swansea |
| 15:00 GMT | Allen (yellow card) 45+1' | Report | Baines 59'; Gibson (yellow card) 74'; Jelavić 76'; Pienaar (yellow card) 83' | Stadium: Liberty Stadium; Attendance: 20,509; Referee: Neil Swarbrick |

| 1 April 2012 31 | Tottenham Hotspur | 3–1 | Swansea City | London |
| 16:00 GMT | van der Vaart 19'; Adebayor 73', 86' | Report | Sigurðsson 59' | Stadium: White Hart Lane; Attendance: 36,174; Referee: Andre Marriner |

| 6 April 2012 32 | Swansea City | 0–2 | Newcastle United | Swansea |
| 16:30 GMT | Williams (yellow card) 58' | Report | Cissé 5', 69'; Williamson (yellow card) 39' | Stadium: Liberty Stadium; Attendance: 19,874; Referee: Howard Webb |

| 11 April 2012 33 | Queens Park Rangers | 3–0 | Swansea City | London |
| 20:00 GMT | Barton 45+1'; Mackie 55'; Buzsáky 67'; Taiwo (yellow card) 72'; Diakité (yellow card) 79' | Report | | Stadium: Loftus Road; Attendance: 17,557; Referee: Lee Probert |

| 14 April 2012 34 | Swansea City | 3–0 | Blackburn Rovers | Swansea |
| 15:00 GMT | Sigurðsson 37'; Dyer 43'; Dann 63' (o.g.) | Report | Hoilett (yellow card) 33'; Formica (yellow card) 90+1' | Stadium: Liberty Stadium; Attendance: 18,985; Referee: Mark Clattenburg |

| 21 April 2012 35 | Bolton Wanderers | 1–1 | Swansea City | Bolton |
| 15:00 GMT | Eagles 14'; M. Davies (yellow card) 41'; Steinsson (yellow card) 63' | Report | Sinclair 6'; Williams (yellow card) 30' | Stadium: Reebok Stadium; Attendance: 25,401; Referee: Phil Dowd |

| 28 April 2012 36 | Swansea City | 4–4 | Wolverhampton Wanderers | Swansea |
| 15:00 GMT | Orlandi 1'; Allen 4'; Dyer 15'; Graham 31'; Moore (yellow card) 90'; Britton (yellow card) 90' | Report | Fletcher 28'; Jarvis 33', 69'; Edwards 54'; Ward (yellow card) 57' | Stadium: Liberty Stadium; Attendance: 19,408; Referee: Jonathan Moss |

| 6 May 2012 37 | Manchester United | 2–0 | Swansea City | Manchester |
| 16:00 GMT | Scholes 28'; Young 41'; Rooney (yellow card) 71' | Report | | Stadium: Old Trafford; Attendance: 75,496; Referee: Chris Foy |

| 13 May 2012 38 | Swansea City | 1–0 | Liverpool | Swansea |
| 15:00 GMT | Williams (yellow card) 45+2'; Graham 86' | Report | Carroll (yellow card) 45+2' | Stadium: Liberty Stadium; Attendance: 20,605; Referee: Mark Halsey |

=== FA Cup ===
| 7 January 2012 3rd round | Barnsley | 2–4 | Swansea City | Barnsley |
| 15:00 GMT | Vaz Tê 29', 65'; McEveley (yellow card) 74'; Addison (yellow card) 87' | Report | Rangel 30' (yellow card) 75'; Graham 46', 89'; Dyer 54'; Taylor (yellow card) 64' | Stadium: Oakwell; Attendance: 7,380; Referee: Stuart Attwell |

| 28 January 2012 4th round | Bolton Wanderers | 2–1 | Swansea City | Bolton |
| 15:00 GMT | Pratley 45+2'; Eagles 56'; Wheater (yellow card) 67'; Petrov (yellow card) 89'; Riley (yellow card) 90+1'; M. Davies (yellow card) 90+2' | Report | Moore 43' | Stadium: Reebok Stadium; Attendance: 11,597; Referee: Anthony Taylor |

=== League Cup ===
| 23 August 2011 2nd round | Shrewsbury Town | 3–1 | Swansea City | Shrewsbury |
| 19:45 BST | Morgan 19'; Wright 67'; Wroe 90+1' | Report | Cansdell-Sherriff 10' (o.g.) | Stadium: Greenhous Meadow; Attendance: 4,063; Referee: Paul Tierney |
