= Ashley Williams (footballer) =

Wales international footballer

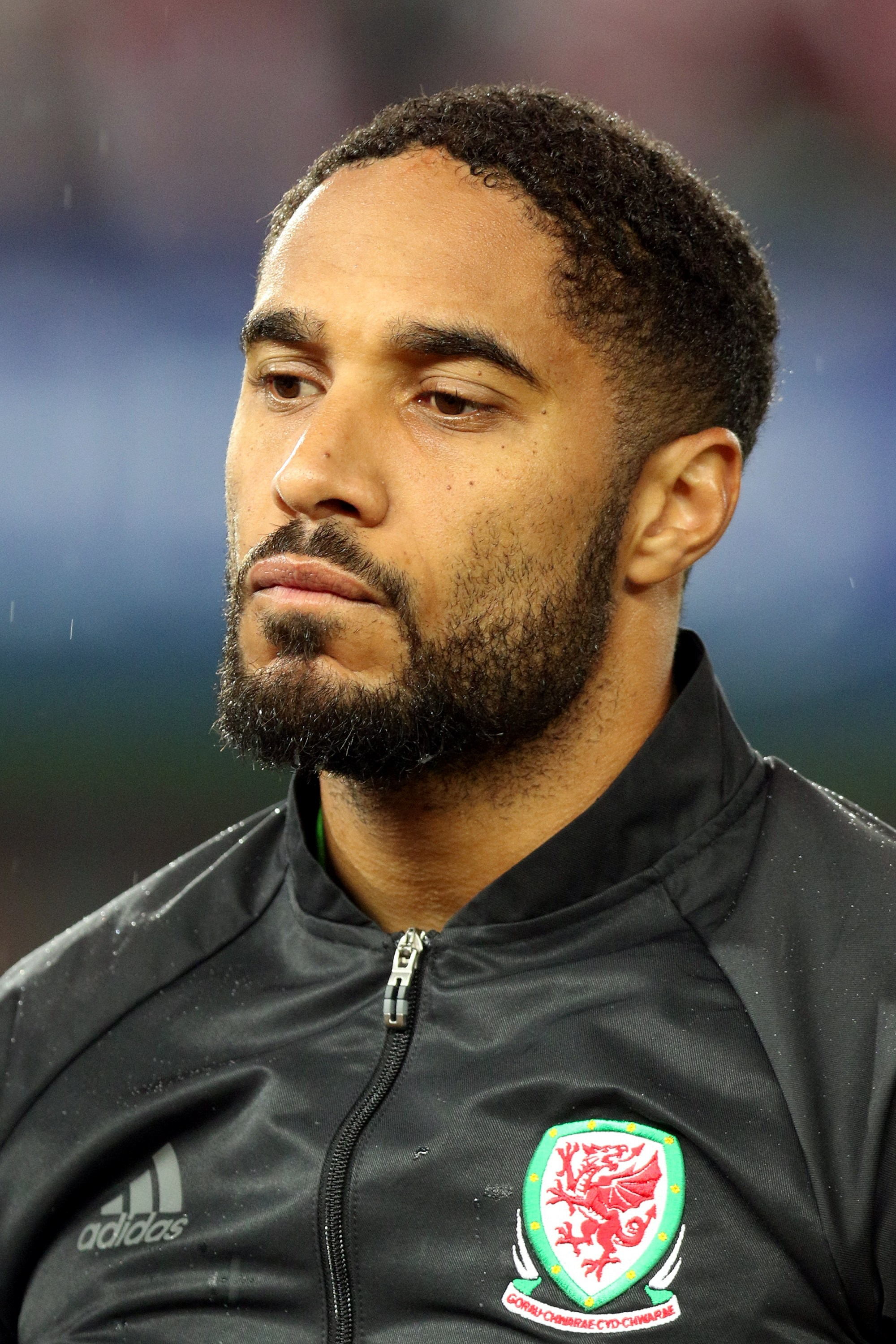
- Williams lining up for Wales in 2016

Personal information
- Full name: Ashley Errol Williams
- Date of birth: 23 August 1984 (age 42)
- Place of birth: Wolverhampton, England
- Height: 6 ft 0 in (1.83 m)
- Position: Centre-back

Team information
- Current team: Swansea City (interim head coach)

Youth career
- Tamworth
- West Bromwich Albion

Senior career*
Years	Team	Apps	(Gls)
2001–2003	Hednesford Town	46	(0)
2003–2008	Stockport County	162	(3)
2008	→ Swansea City (loan)	3	(0)
2008–2016	Swansea City	319	(14)
2016–2019	Everton	60	(2)
2018–2019	→ Stoke City (loan)	33	(1)
2019–2020	Bristol City	32	(2)
Total		655	(22)

International career
2008–2019	Wales	86	(2)

Managerial career
- 2026–: Swansea City (interim)
Medal record
Men's football
Representing Wales
UEFA European Championship
Bronze medal – third place	2016 France
- * Club domestic league appearances and goals

Ashley Errol Williams (born 23 August 1984) is a former professional footballer who played as a centre-back and is current interim head coach of EFL Championship club Swansea City.

After being released from West Bromwich Albion as a teenager, Williams played for non-league side Hednesford Town before turning professional at Stockport County in 2003, later becoming their captain. In March 2008, he was loaned to Swansea City, and after helping them win the League One title, signed for a then club record £400,000. He amassed 352 appearances for the Swans, scoring 14 goals. He aided them in their promotion to the Premier League and their victory in the 2013 Football League Cup Final.

In August 2016, he signed a three-year contract with fellow Premier League side Everton for a fee of £12 million. Williams was a regular in his first season at Goodison Park but eventually fell out of favour and he spent the 2018–19 season on loan at Stoke City. Upon his release by Everton, Williams signed a short-term deal with Bristol City in August 2019 which was extended in November of that year. He left the club at the end of the 2019–20 season and announced his retirement in January 2021 at the age of 36.

Williams earned 86 international caps for the Wales national team, scoring twice. He captained the team at Euro 2016, where Wales reached the semi-finals.

== Club career ==
=== Early career ===
Born in Wolverhampton, West Midlands, Williams began his career at West Bromwich Albion as a youth player but was released by the club at age 16. He went on to play for non-league Hednesford Town.

=== Stockport County ===
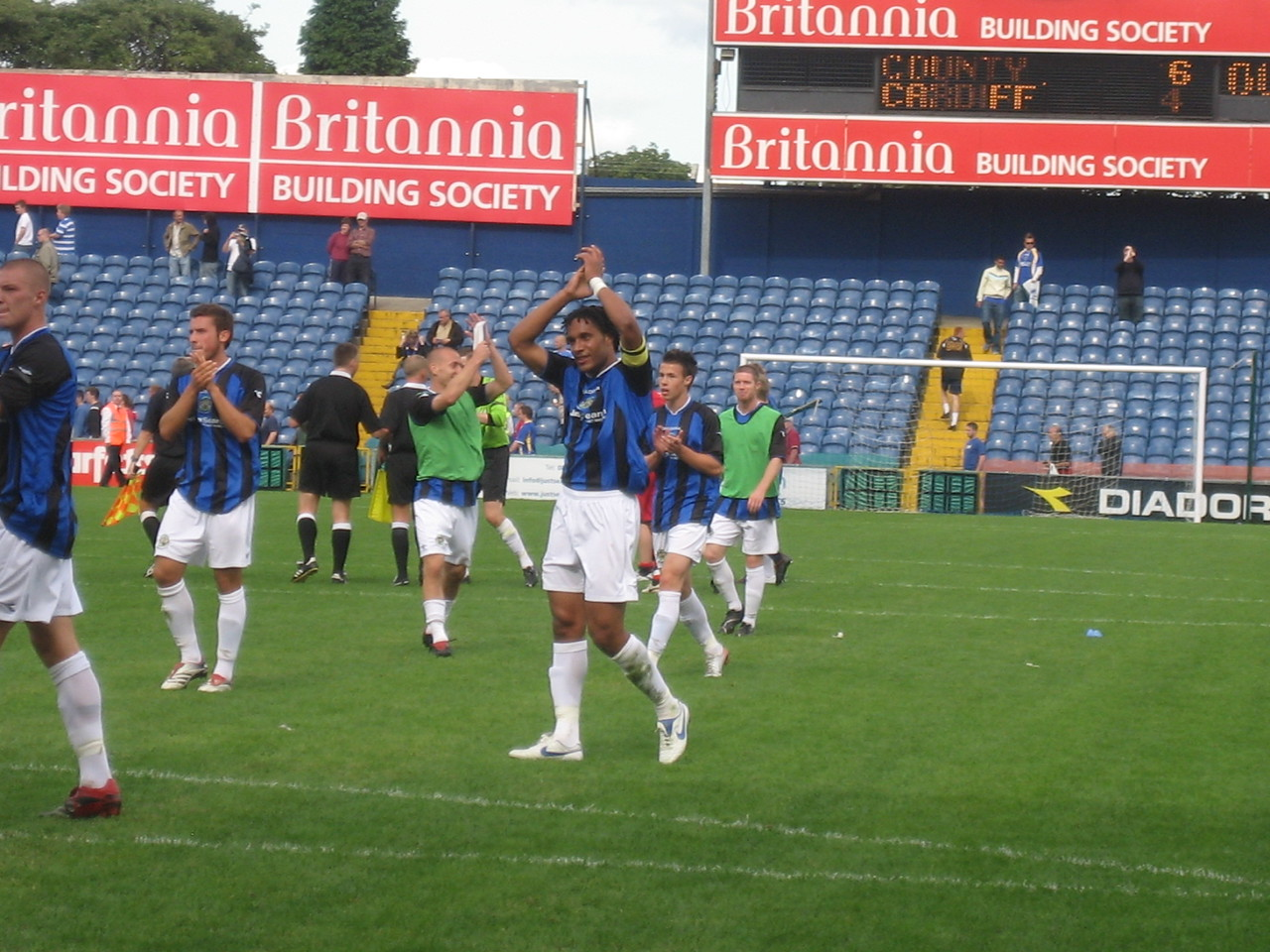
Williams whilst playing for Stockport County, Summer 2007

In late 2003 he left to join Division Two side Stockport County Williams later became captain of Stockport and was still at the club when he made his international debut for Wales. In November 2007, Williams won both the inaugural North-West League Two Player of the Year Award and the North-West Player of the Year Award.

=== Swansea City ===
In March 2008, Williams signed for Swansea City on loan until the end of the 2007–08 season, with a view to a permanent transfer. After helping Swansea win the League One title and, with it, promotion to the second tier of English football for the first time in 24 years, the move was made permanent for a reported £400,000, a club record transfer fee at the time.

On 16 September 2008, Williams scored his first Swansea goal in a 1–1 draw against Derby County. The defender impressed during his first season at Championship level, eventually going on to be named Wales Footballer of the Year at an FAW awards dinner in November 2009. Williams also picked up the Clubman of the Year award at the same event.

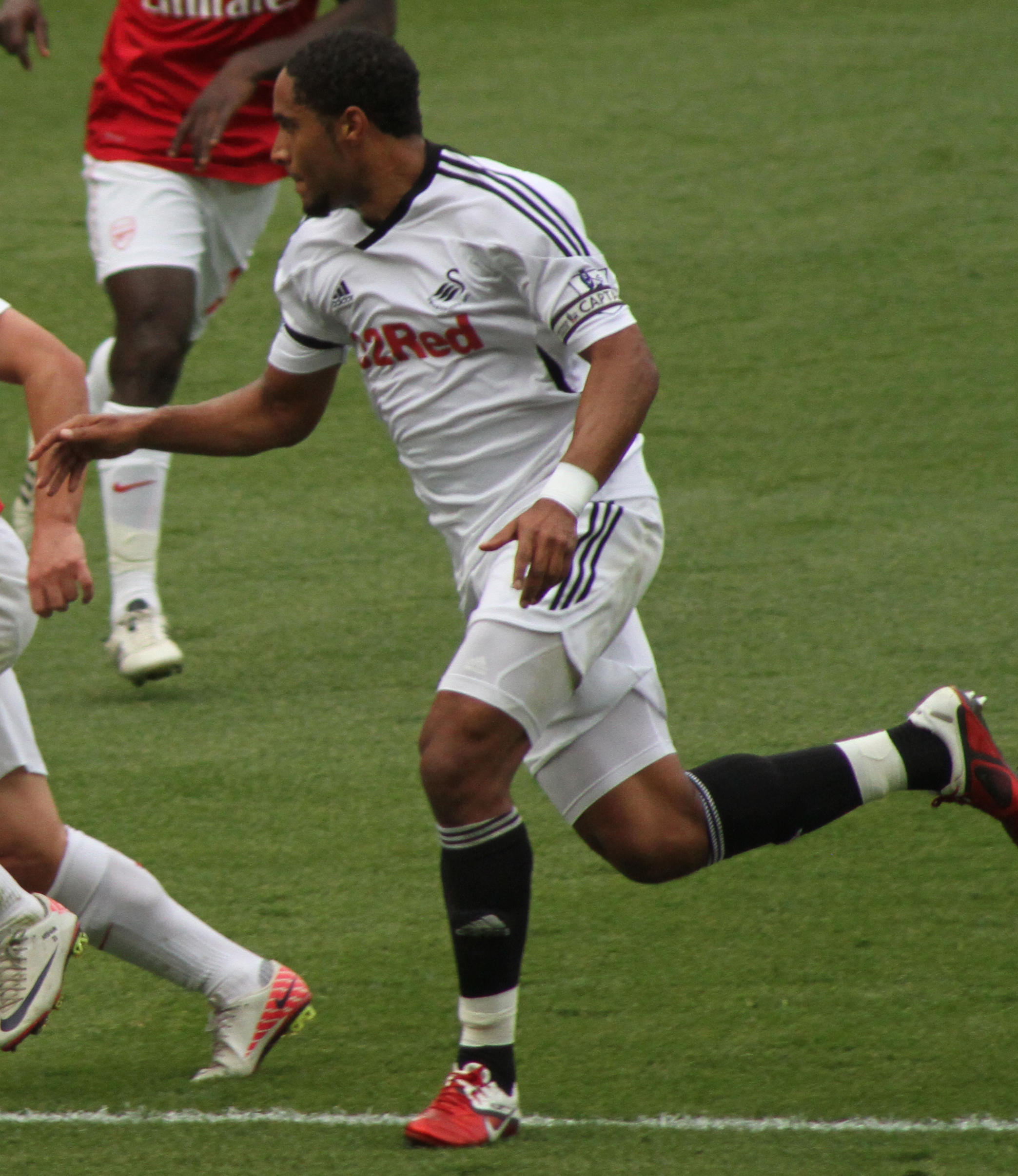
Williams playing for Swansea City in 2011

After finishing in eighth position during their first Championship campaign, Swansea improved on their position by one place the following season, missing out on a play-off position by a single point. Williams was part of a defence that conceded only 37 goals during that campaign, and was selected in the 2009–10 Championship PFA Team of the Year at the end of the season.

The 2010–11 season saw Swansea and Williams gain promotion to the Premier League via a play-off final win at Wembley Stadium. Williams was named in the Championship PFA Team of the Year for the second consecutive season. The season also saw him equal and surpass a club record of 106 consecutive matches, previously jointly held by Andy Legg and Gilbert Beech.

Swansea's first Premier League season began with a 4–0 loss at eventual champions Manchester City, but the club went on to finish the season in 11th place. On 24 September 2011, Williams scored his first ever Premier League goal in a 4–1 loss at Chelsea, after heading in a Mark Gower free kick.

In October 2012, Williams signed a new three-year contract with Swansea. The club's second season in the Premier League saw a ninth-placed finish and a first major trophy win in English football for Williams and Swansea, following a 5–0 win over Bradford City in the 2013 League Cup final on 24 February 2013. After captaining the team during the final at Wembley, Williams lifted the trophy with club captain Garry Monk, who had come on as a second-half substitute.

Also in the 2012–13 season, Alex Ferguson claimed that Robin van Persie "could have been killed" after being hit in the back of his head by a football which Williams had kicked at him. Despite Ferguson calling for a player ban The Football Association took no further action. (Williams denied kicking the ball deliberately into Van Persie's head.)

In July 2013, after acting as captain for the majority of Swansea's matches during the previous two seasons, Williams was permanently handed the club captaincy after Monk stepped down from the role. On 4 July 2014, Williams signed a new four-year contract with Swansea. On 19 April 2015, he was selected in the Team of the Decade at the Football League Awards.

=== Everton ===
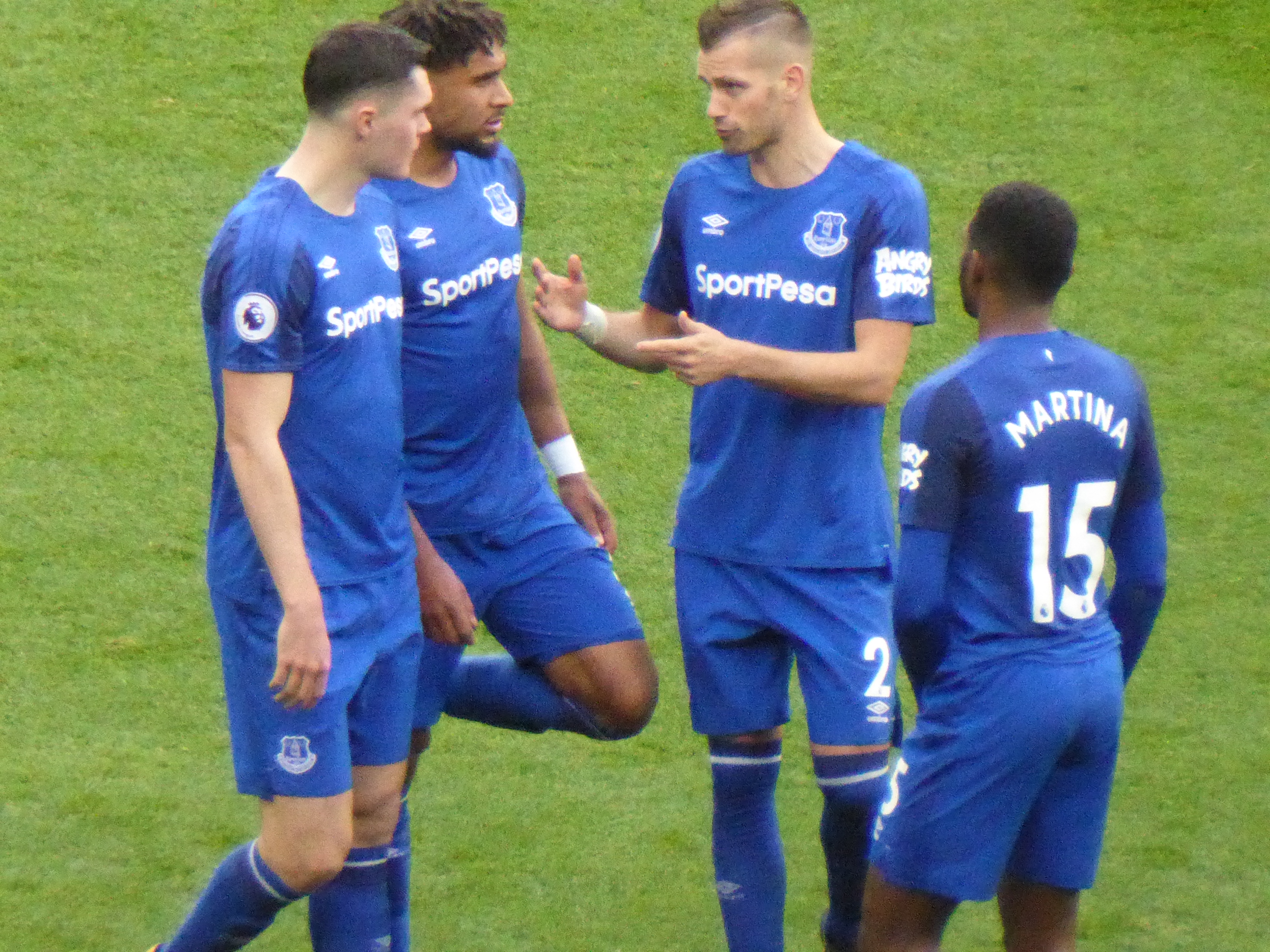
Williams (second from left) during a match against Manchester United in September 2017

On 10 August 2016, Williams joined Everton on a three-year contract for a £12 million transfer fee. He made his debut ten days later as a substitute in a 2–1 win against West Bromwich Albion at The Hawthorns, and three days after that, made his first start for Everton in a 4–0 EFL Cup win at home to Yeovil Town. Williams scored his first Everton goal with an 86th-minute header to secure a 2–1 win over Arsenal on 13 December. On 4 April 2017, he was sent-off at Manchester United for handling a goalbound shot by Luke Shaw, from which Zlatan Ibrahimović scored a penalty to equalise in a 1–1 draw.

Williams scored Everton's goal in their 2–1 Europa League group stage home loss to Lyon on 19 October 2017. He was also booked in that match for pushing Lyon goalkeeper Anthony Lopes into an advertising board, prompting a brawl involving both sets of players and Everton supporters. After the match, Everton manager Ronald Koeman said Williams needed to work on his self-control.

==== Loan to Stoke City ====
On 2 August 2018, Williams joined Stoke City on loan for the 2018–19 season. He made his debut nine days later in a 1–1 home draw with Brentford, replacing the injured Bruno Martins Indi after 26 minutes. On 22 August, he was sent off in a 3–0 loss to Wigan Athletic. Williams played 37 times for Stoke during the season, scoring once in a 2–2 draw with Norwich City on 22 April 2019.

Williams was released by Everton at the end of the 2018–19 season.

=== Bristol City ===
On 23 August 2019, Williams signed a short-term deal with Championship club Bristol City that would run until "mid-January". His club debut came at previous team Stoke, before making his first home appearance against longtime former employers Swansea. He scored his first goal for Bristol City on 1 November 2019 in a 2–2 draw with Barnsley. In November 2019, he signed an extended deal until the end of the 2019–20 season. He left the club at the end of the season on the expiration of his contract.

=== Retirement ===
On 26 January 2021, Williams announced his retirement from professional football, aged 36.

== International career ==
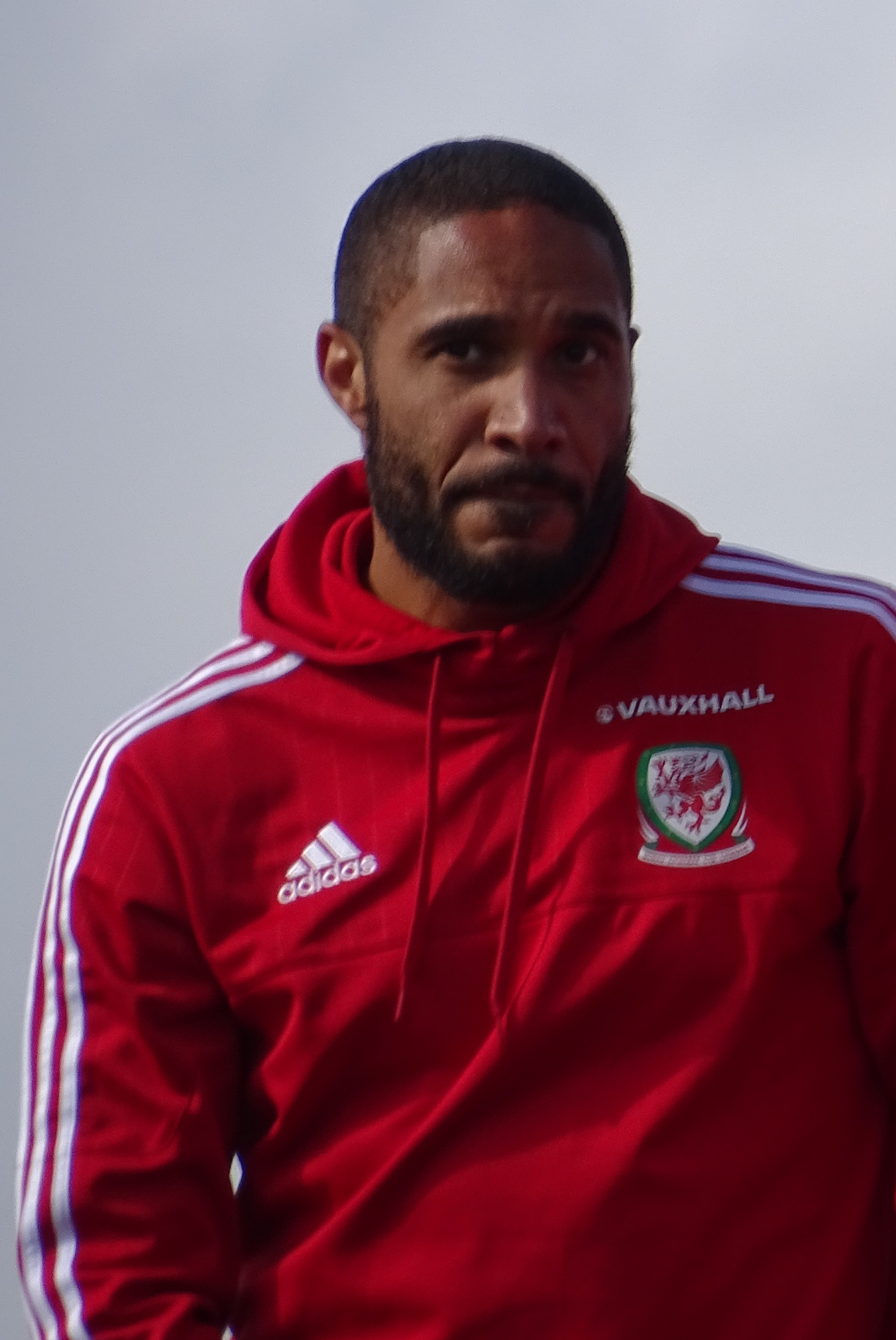
Williams during Wales' post-Euro 2016 homecoming party

Williams qualifies for the Wales national team through his maternal grandfather Bill Rowlands from Gelli, Rhondda. He made his international debut on 26 March 2008, two days before securing his move to Swansea City. In the match, he played the full 90 minutes for John Toshack's men in their 2–0 friendly away win in Luxembourg, making an early error through a poor backpass to goalkeeper Lewis Price, but recovered possession in time.

On 1 April 2009, Williams scored an own goal in a 2–0 loss to Germany in qualification for the 2010 FIFA World Cup, deflecting Mario Gómez's cross at the Millennium Stadium. He captained the country for the first time on 14 November in a 3–0 friendly win over Scotland at the Cardiff City Stadium. On 11 October 2010, he scored his first international goal in a 5–1 friendly win over Luxembourg in Parc y Scarlets, finishing a header from debutant Steve Morison.

In October 2012, Williams was named captain of Wales by manager Chris Coleman, replacing Aaron Ramsey. Coleman, who by that point had not won in his four matches, awarded the armband to Williams on account of his experience over the younger Ramsey. The decision was criticised by Raymond Verheijen, the assistant to Coleman's predecessor, Gary Speed.

On 31 May 2016, Williams was named in Coleman's 23-man squad for UEFA Euro 2016, Wales' first major tournament for more than half a century. On 1 July in Lille, Williams headed the equalising goal, against Belgium in the quarter-finals as Wales eventually won 3–1 to progress to the semi-finals for the first time in their international football history. In the semi-final, Wales lost 2–0 to Portugal.

Williams earned 86 caps for Wales and scored two goals with his last cap coming in June 2019 in a 1–0 away loss to Hungary.

== Personal life ==
Williams is of Jamaican descent through his father and of Welsh descent through his mother. In his time at Hednesford Town, Williams supported himself with various jobs including at a petrol station, as a waiter at Beefeater, and running a sideshow at Drayton Manor.

In December 2010, Williams established the charity WillsWorld with his wife Vanessa, with a view to helping under-privileged children. He is also a patron of Street Football Wales which fights social exclusion, and the Ethan Perkins Trust, which raises funds for research, support and awareness into childhood brain tumours.

Williams was a Liverpool fan as a child and his favourite player was John Barnes. He also likes basketball and supports the Miami Heat.

== Career statistics ==
=== Club ===
Appearances and goals by club, season and competition
Club	Season	League			FA Cup		League Cup		Other (Note: Includes UEFA Europa League, Football League Championship play-offs, FA Trophy, Southern League Cup, Staffordshire Senior Cup and Birmingham Senior Cup)		Total	
Club	Season	Division	Apps	Goals	Apps	Goals	Apps	Goals	Apps	Goals	Apps	Goals
Hednesford Town	2001–02	Southern League Premier Division	2	0	0	0	—		2	0	4	0
Hednesford Town	2002–03	Southern League Premier Division	33	0	0	0	—		9	0	42	0
Hednesford Town	2003–04	Southern League Premier Division	11	0	1	0	—		2	0	14	0
Hednesford Town	Total		46	0	1	0	0	0	13	0	60	0
Stockport County	2003–04	Second Division	10	0	0	0	0	0	—		10	0
Stockport County	2004–05	League One	44	1	3	1	1	0	1	0	49	2
Stockport County	2005–06	League Two	36	1	1	0	1	0	—		38	1
Stockport County	2006–07	League Two	46	1	2	0	1	0	1	0	50	1
Stockport County	2007–08	League Two	26	0	0	0	2	0	1	0	29	0
Stockport County	Total		162	3	6	1	5	0	3	0	175	4
Swansea City	2007–08	League One	3	0	0	0	0	0	—		3	0
Swansea City	2008–09	Championship	46	2	4	0	1	0	—		51	2
Swansea City	2009–10	Championship	46	5	0	0	0	0	—		46	5
Swansea City	2010–11	Championship	46	3	2	0	2	0	3	0	53	3
Swansea City	2011–12	Premier League	37	1	2	0	1	0	—		40	1
Swansea City	2012–13	Premier League	37	0	0	0	4	0	—		41	0
Swansea City	2013–14	Premier League	34	1	2	0	0	0	7	0	43	1
Swansea City	2014–15	Premier League	37	0	0	0	2	0	—		39	0
Swansea City	2015–16	Premier League	36	2	0	0	0	0	—		36	2
Swansea City	Total		322	14	10	0	10	0	10	0	352	14
Everton	2016–17	Premier League	36	1	1	0	2	0	—		39	1
Everton	2017–18	Premier League	24	1	0	0	2	0	8	1	34	2
Everton	Total		60	2	1	0	4	0	8	1	73	3
Stoke City (loan)	2018–19	Championship	33	1	2	0	2	0	—		37	1
Bristol City	2019–20	Championship	32	2	1	0	0	0	—		33	2
Career total			655	22	21	1	21	0	34	1	731	24

=== International ===
Appearances and goals by national team and year
National team	Year	Apps	Goals
Wales	2008	9	0
Wales	2009	9	0
Wales	2010	6	1
Wales	2011	7	0
Wales	2012	7	0
Wales	2013	6	0
Wales	2014	5	0
Wales	2015	7	0
Wales	2016	13	1
Wales	2017	7	0
Wales	2018	7	0
Wales	2019	3	0
Total		86	2

Wales score listed first, score column indicates score after each Williams goal.

International goals by date, venue, cap, opponent, score, result and competition
No.	Date	Venue	Cap	Opponent	Score	Result	Competition
1	11 August 2010	Parc y Scarlets, Llanelli, Wales	21	Luxembourg	4–1	5–1	Friendly
2	1 July 2016	Stade Pierre-Mauroy, Villeneuve-d'Ascq, France	64	Belgium	1–1	3–1	UEFA Euro 2016

== Honours ==
Swansea City

- Football League Championship play-offs: 2011
- Football League One: 2007–08
- Football League Cup: 2012–13

Individual

- PFA Team of the Year: 2009–10 Championship, 2010–11 Championship
- The Football League Team of the Decade
- Welsh Footballer of the Year: 2009
