= Darnel Situ =

French footballer (born 1992)

Personal information
- Full name: Darnel Situ Buyente
- Date of birth: 18 March 1992 (age 34)
- Place of birth: Rouen, France
- Height: 1.87 m (6 ft 2 in)
- Position: Centre-back

Youth career
- 1999–2003: Saint-Étienne du Rouvray
- 2003–2009: Lens

Senior career*
Years	Team	Apps	(Gls)
2009–2011	Lens	1	(0)
2010–2011	→ Lens II	10	(0)
2011	→ Swansea City (loan)	0	(0)
2012–2014	Swansea City	0	(0)
2014–2015	AGF	6	(0)
2015	IL Hødd	0	(0)
2016	Koper	4	(0)

International career
2007–2008	France U16	11	(2)
2008–2009	France U17	17	(3)
2009–2010	France U18	9	(1)
2010–2011	France U19	12	(1)
- * Club domestic league appearances and goals as of 3 October 2016

Darnel Situ Buyente (born 18 March 1992) is a French footballer. He is a French youth international and has captained at all levels of youth he has played at. Situ primarily plays as a centre back or a holding midfielder.

== Football career ==
=== Early career ===
Born in Rouen, Situ began his career playing for Football Club Saint-Étienne du Rouvray in the department of Seine-Maritime, spending his childhood years with the club's under-11 squad. In 2003, he moved up north to the next region over joining RC Lens on a youth contract. While at the Gaillette, short for the Centre Technique et Sportif de la Gaillette, Lens's youth academy, Situ established himself as one of the club's top youth prospects, alongside fellow defender William Rémy and midfielders Alexandre Coeff and Mehdi Abeid. He captained Lens's under-16 team that reached the semi-final stage of the Championnat National under-16 league, though Lens finished the group stage without a single point. While playing with the national under-16 team, Situ, alongside Rennes starlet Jérémy Hélan, drew the interest of Premier League clubs Manchester United, Chelsea, and Liverpool, as well as Portsmouth. Situ, at one point, met with Manchester United manager Alex Ferguson, but a deal could not be reached. France teammate Helan later joined Manchester City.

=== Lens ===
Despite constant rumours of Situ rejecting a contract with his parent club for a move abroad, on 4 February 2009, he signed his first professional contract agreeing to a three-year deal with Lens. For the 2009–10 season, despite being only 17, he was inserted onto the club's senior team, but was not assigned a number. Manager Jean-Guy Wallemme, instead, allowed the young player to get some stable playing time in the Championnat de France amateur, the fourth division of French football, with the team's reserve squad. Situ made his debut in the reserves opening match against Vesoul Haute-Saône, appearing as a substitute. He earned his first start the following week playing the entire 90 minutes in the team's 0–0 draw with Olympique Noisy-le-Sec. After appearing on the bench for several league and cup matches with the senior team at the start of the 2010 portion of the season, Situ made his professional debut in the club's Round of 64 Coupe de France match against amateur club AFC Compiègne. He started the match in the centre back position alongside veteran Ala Eddine Yahia and played the entire 90 minutes in the team's 1–0 victory.

Situ had a trial at Newcastle United and scored a goal in his debut in a reserves match 5–0 win over Gateshead Reserves.

=== Swansea City ===
Situ agreed a two-year deal with Swansea on 31 August 2011 signing for an initial fee of £250,000. Several weeks later, FIFA announced that international clearance would not be granted for Situ. As a result, Lens loaned him out to Swansea for the 2011 portion of the season and, on 10 January 2012, announced that it had reached an agreement with Swansea on a permanent deal.

On 25 September 2012, Situ was an unused substitute in Swansea's 3–2 win over Crawley Town in the League Cup.

On 13 November 2012, Situ ruptured his Achilles in a 2–1 defeat to Cardiff City Under-21s. After nearly a year out, Situ returned to the Swansea City Under-21s squad on 4 November 2013. Darnell left the Swans at the end of the 2014 season without making a senior appearance.

=== AGF Aarhus ===
On 18 August 2014, Situ signed a one-year deal with AGF on a free transfer.

== International career ==
Situ has represented and captained several of French national youth sides, which include the under-16, under-17, and, most recently, the under-18 team. With the under-16s, Situ made ten appearances, scoring two goals. With the under-17 team, he was designated as captain and tasked with the challenge of qualifying for the 2009 UEFA European Under-17 Football Championship. Situ led the team to qualification while appearing in 17 of the 19 total matches contested, scoring three goals against England in the Algarve Cup, Belarus in qualification for under-17 competition, and against Switzerland in the tournament itself. France was eliminated in the group stage portion of the tournament following their loss to Italy.

Situ joined the under-18 team in August 2009, as an underage player, playing with his elder peers at the SBS Cup in the Japanese prefecture of Shizuoka. He finished the 2009–10 under-18 campaign with nine caps and one goal, which came against Denmark.
