= Jazz Richards =

Welsh footballer

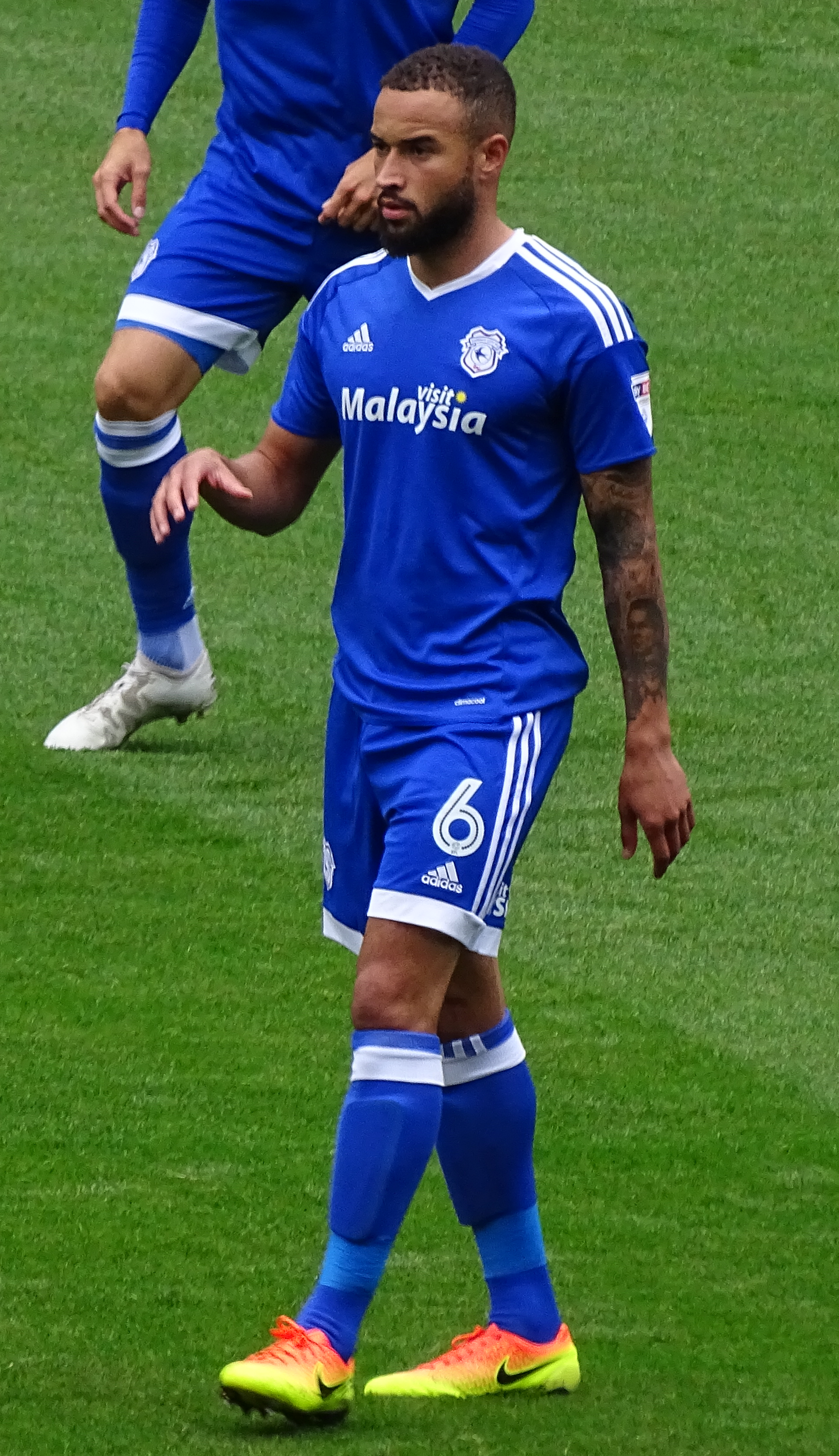
- Richards playing for Cardiff City in 2016

Personal information
- Full name: Ashley Darel Jazz Richards
- Date of birth: 12 April 1991 (age 35)
- Place of birth: Swansea, Wales
- Height: 5 ft 8 in (1.73 m)
- Positions: Full back; midfielder

Youth career
- West End
- 2005–2007: Cardiff City
- 2007–2009: Swansea City

Senior career*
Years	Team	Apps	(Gls)
2009–2015	Swansea City	39	(0)
2013	→ Crystal Palace (loan)	11	(0)
2013	→ Huddersfield Town (loan)	9	(0)
2015	→ Fulham (loan)	14	(0)
2015–2016	Fulham	22	(0)
2016–2020	Cardiff City	47	(0)
2021–2024	Haverfordwest County	64	(4)

International career^{‡}
2007–2008	Wales U17	10	(0)
2008–2009	Wales U19	11	(0)
2009–2012	Wales U21	15	(0)
2012–2018	Wales	14	(0)

Managerial career
- 2021: Haverfordwest County (joint-interim)
Medal record
Men's football
Representing Wales
UEFA European Championship
Bronze medal – third place	2016 France
- * Club domestic league appearances and goals as of 22 November 2024 ‡ National team caps and goals as of 16:00, 20 October 2018 (UTC)

Ashley Darel Jazz Richards (born 12 April 1991) is a Welsh former footballer who played as a full-back.

A versatile player who is also capable of playing at left-back and as a midfielder, Richards began his professional career at his hometown club Swansea City, having previously played youth football for their local rivals Cardiff City. He made only 51 appearances for the club in all competitions during a six-year spell with the first team.

During his time with the Swans, he spent time on loan with Crystal Palace, Huddersfield Town and Fulham, before joining the latter for an undisclosed fee in 2015. He established himself in Fulham's first team for a brief period. In 2016, he returned to Cardiff City, helping the club win promotion to the Premier League in 2018.

He signed for Haverfordwest County on 6 March 2021 on a contract until the end of the season.

Richards made his full international debut for Wales in 2012, and represented the nation at UEFA Euro 2016. He has won 14 caps for his country.

== Club career ==
=== Swansea City ===
==== Youth and first–team breakthrough ====
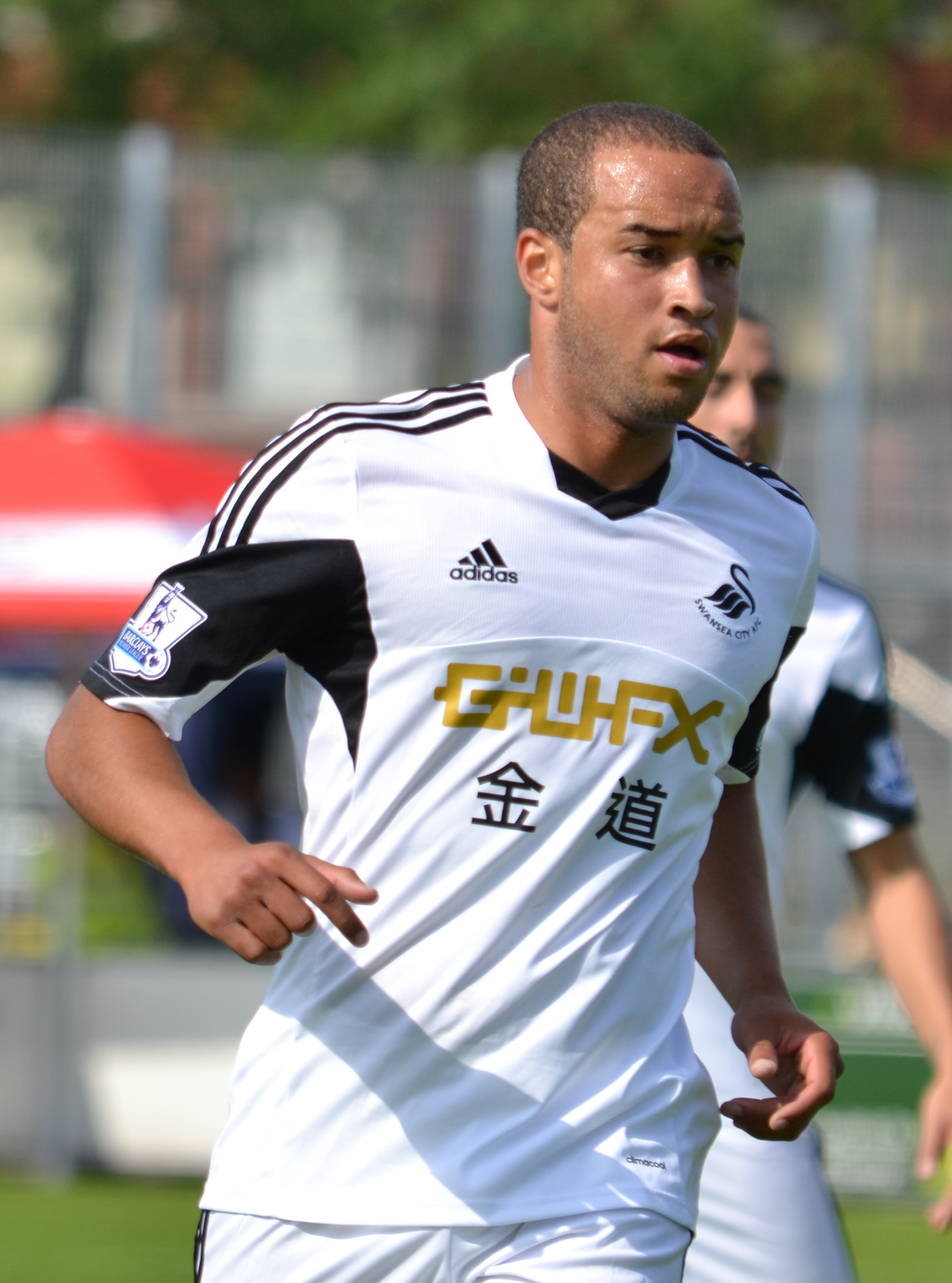
Richards playing for Swansea City in 2013

Born in Swansea, Richards played local football for his schools and local club West End, before joining the Cardiff City Academy. After two seasons, he was released and joined the academy at their South Wales rivals Swansea City at the age of fifteen. Richards initially started out as a central midfielder but switched to playing as a defender under manager Roberto Martínez due to the increased competition between midfielders in the first team at the time. He has since continued to play at that position as well. Richards earned £60 a week while on a scholarship with the Swans. He then signed his first professional contract with the team.

After spending two seasons with the academy and reserve sides, Richards made his professional debut for Swansea in a Championship match against Middlesbrough during a 3–0 loss on 15 August 2009, replacing Shaun MacDonald as a substitute in the 63rd minute. After Richards made 15 appearances during the 2009–10 season, he signed a new two-year deal with Swansea.

The start of the 2010–11 season saw Richards spend the opening six months as an unused substitute or in the reserve side. He did not make his first appearance of the season until 3 January 2011, during a 2–1 defeat against Leicester City following a defensive injury crisis where several first team players were ruled out. Throughout January and February, Richards was given a handful of first team opportunities. However, he lost his first team place for the remainder of the season following the return of Àngel Rangel from injury. He made eight appearances during the 2010–11 season as Swansea went on to become the first Welsh team ever to gain promotion to the Premier League.

After appearing on the bench for several matches at the start of the following season, Richards made his Premier League debut when he came on as a substitute for Neil Taylor during a 3–1 loss to Norwich City on 15 October 2011. Twelve days later, he was rewarded with a new 18-month contract. He then made his first start for the club in the Premier League, playing in a 4–2 loss against Blackburn Rovers on 3 December 2011. As the 2011–12 season progressed, Richards was sent to play in the reserves for the rest of the season, in order to regain his fitness. He finished the season with eight appearances.

==== Loan to Crystal Palace in 2013 ====
At the start of the 2012–13 season, Richards struggled to break into the first team over Rangel in the right-back position. Because of this, he stated his desire to leave the club on loan to gain experience and compete for his spot in the first team. However, he was forced to wait until the winter transfer window to secure a move. In the first half of the season, he made just four appearances for Swansea, all in cup competitions. At the end of January, he joined Crystal Palace on loan until the end of the season. He made his debut for the club five days later, on 30 January 2013 in a 1–0 loss against Huddersfield Town. In his next match, against Charlton Athletic, Richards assisted Glenn Murray's winning goal, as Palace defeated their South London rivals 2–1. During his loan spell, he signed a new contract with Swansea until June 2016. He went on to make 11 appearances and appeared as an unused substitute in the 2013 Championship play-off final, as Palace beat Watford 1–0 to achieve promotion to the Premier League.

==== Loan to Huddersfield Town ====
After returning to Swansea, Richards made his first appearance of the 2013–14 season in the second leg of the Europa League qualifiers, a 0–0 draw against Malmö, helping Swansea advance 4–0 on aggregate. On 10 September 2013, Richards joined Championship side Huddersfield Town on a 93-day emergency loan. After not being able to obtain international clearance from FIFA in time to play against Doncaster Rovers on 14 September, he made his Town debut as a substitute in a 2–1 win over Charlton Athletic on 17 September 2013. His loan spell ended on 17 December after just 9 appearances for the Terriers. Following his return from his loan spell, Richards did not appear in another match until 16 February 2014 when he made played in a 3–1 loss against Everton in the last-sixteen of the FA Cup. He made no further appearances during the remainder of the season.

==== Return to Swansea ====
In the 2014–15 season, Richards made his first appearance of the season in the first round of the League Cup, in a 1–0 win over Rotherham United on 26 August 2014. He then made his first Premier League appearance in two years when he came on as a substitute in the 82nd minute of a 0–0 draw against Sunderland on 27 September 2014. Following this, Richards was given a handful of first team appearances throughout 2014 despite struggling to compete with Rangel and suffering his own injury concerns. In a 2–1 loss against Tottenham Hotspur on 14 December 2014, Richards made an error that led to Christian Eriksen scoring the winning goal. After the match, he issued an apology to Swansea City supporters for his error. Despite his apology, he became a victim of abuse on social media website Twitter by Swansea City supporters. Manager Garry Monk backed Richards and picked him in the club's following fixture against Hull City.

This turned out to be Richards' last season with Swansea. In six years, he made just 51 appearances for the club and never established himself as a regular. Only 18 of his appearances coming in the Premier League. His lone match in the 2013–14 Europa League qualifiers was his only appearance in a European competition for the club.

=== Fulham ===
On 24 January 2015, Richards joined Championship side Fulham on a one-month loan deal. He made his debut for the club on 31 January 2015, starting in a 2–1 loss against Blackburn Rovers. After making five appearances, Richards had his loan spell with Fulham extended until the end of the season. Richards went on to make 14 appearances for the Cottagers, all of which were starts.

On 2 July 2015, Swansea accepted Fulham's bid for Richards to transfer on a permanent deal. He signed a three-year deal with the option of a fourth, for an undisclosed fee. Although his year was marked with injuries, Richards' made 22 appearances in his only season as a permanent player at the club. He established himself as a regular when he was fit. However, ahead of the 2016–17 season, Richards was expected to lose his first team place at Fulham, with manager Slaviša Jokanović preferring Ryan Fredericks in the right-back position. As a result, Fulham accepted a bid from Cardiff City for Richards.

=== Cardiff City ===
On 19 July 2016, Richards joined Championship club Cardiff City on a three-year deal in a swap move which saw Scott Malone join Fulham. He made his debut in a goalless draw at Birmingham City, where he became embroiled in controversy after reportedly refusing to do Cardiff's traditional ayatollah gesture, performed by fans of the club, several times at the match. However, the club later released video footage that showed him performing the gesture.

After starting the season as a regular in the first team, Richards suffered a training injury in September that led to him missing three months of the season. His lengthy rehabilitation prompted manager Neil Warnock to quip "I've had lads with broken legs recover quicker than him." He eventually made his return on 2 January, as unused substitute against Aston Villa. He enjoyed an extended run in the first team soon after, playing in ten of the club's following twelve matches, stating that he felt that he had "a lot more to show. I think I'm nowhere near my full potential." In his first season with Cardiff, he appeared in a career high 26 league matches.

At the start of the following season, Richards again suffered an injury blow early in the season, being forced to undergo surgery after hurting his ankle during 2–1 victory over Sunderland on 23 September 2017. He returned from injury in January 2018, playing in five matches before his season was ended by a further injury. He made only eleven appearances in all competitions during the season as Cardiff achieved promotion after finishing as runners-up. Richards was released by Cardiff when his contract finished at the end of the 2019–20 season.

=== Haverfordwest County ===
In March 2021, Richards joined Cymru Premier side Haverfordwest County on a contract until the end of the season. In May 2021, Richards signed a contract extension to keep him at the club until the end of the 2021–22 season. In April 2022, Richards scored his first senior professional goals with a hat trick against Cefn Druids. Subsequently, he signed a two year contract extension to the end of the 2023/2024 season.

Richards played in Haverfordwest's Europa Conference League campaign in 2023, playing against teams KF Shkendija and B36 Torshavn. In May 2024, Richards was placed on the expired contracts list at Haverfordwest and not included in the 2024–25 season squad.

== International career ==
Richards represented the Wales under-17 and under-19 sides. He was called up to the under-21 squad for the first time in March 2009 to face Luxembourg. He won ten or more caps at all three levels during his youth career.

On 27 May 2012, he gained his first full international cap for Wales in their 2–0 friendly loss to Mexico in New Jersey, replacing Neil Taylor for the last ten minutes of the match. Wales qualified for Euro 2016 and Richards was called up into the final 23-man squad. He played his only game in the tournament as a late substitute in the team's first match, a 2–1 victory over Slovakia. Wales went on to reach the semi-finals before losing to Portugal. As of October 2018, Richards has had 14 international caps with Wales, including seven appearances in the starting lineup. He played in four matches in Euro 2016 qualifying and three in 2018 World Cup qualifying.

== Personal life ==
Richards' comes from a family with a sporting background as his cousin Eli Walker is a professional athlete. Walker is a rugby union player.

== Career statistics ==
=== Club ===
As of 22 February 2020

Appearances and goals by club, season and competition
Club	Season	League			National cup		League cup		Other		Total	
Club	Season	Division	Apps	Goals	Apps	Goals	Apps	Goals	Apps	Goals	Apps	Goals
Swansea City	2009–10	Championship	15	0	—		—		—		15	0
Swansea City	2010–11	Championship	6	0	1	0	1	0	—		8	0
Swansea City	2011–12	Premier League	8	0	1	0	0	0	—		9	0
Swansea City	2012–13	Premier League	0	0	1	0	3	0	—		4	0
Swansea City	2013–14	Premier League	0	0	1	0	0	0	1	0	2	0
Swansea City	2014–15	Premier League	10	0	1	0	2	0	—		13	0
Swansea City	Total		39	0	5	0	6	0	1	0	51	0
Crystal Palace (loan)	2012–13	Championship	11	0	—		—		—		11	0
Huddersfield Town (loan)	2013–14	Championship	9	0	—		0	0	—		9	0
Fulham (loan)	2014–15	Championship	14	0	—		—		—		14	0
Fulham	2015–16	Championship	22	0	1	0	3	0	—		26	0
Fulham	Total		36	0	1	0	3	0	0	0	40	0
Cardiff City	2016–17	Championship	26	0	1	0	1	0	0	0	28	0
Cardiff City	2017–18	Championship	6	0	3	0	2	0	0	0	11	0
Cardiff City	2018–19	Premier League	4	0	0	0	1	0	0	0	5	0
Cardiff City	2019–20	Championship	11	0	2	0	0	0	0	0	13	0
Cardiff City	Total		47	0	6	0	4	0	0	0	57	0
Haverfordwest	2020–21	Cymru Premier	5	0	0	0	0	0	0	0	5	0
Haverfordwest	2021–22	Cyru Premier	26	3	1	0	2	0	0	0	30	3
Haverfordwest	2022–23	Cyru Premier	16	1	0	0	0	0	4	0	20	1
Haverfordwest	2023–24	Cyru Premier	10	0	0	0	0	0	0	0	10	0
Haverfordwest	Total		57	4	1	0	2	0	4	0	64	4
Career total			199	4	13	0	15	0	5	0	232	4

=== International ===
As of match played 11 October 2018

Wales national team
Year	Apps	Goals
2012	1	0
2013	3	0
2015	4	0
2016	2	0
2017	3	0
2018	1	0
Total	14	0

== Honours ==
Swansea City

- Football League Championship play-offs: 2011

Crystal Palace

- Football League Championship play-offs: 2013
