= Kemy Agustien =

Curaçaoan footballer (born 1986)

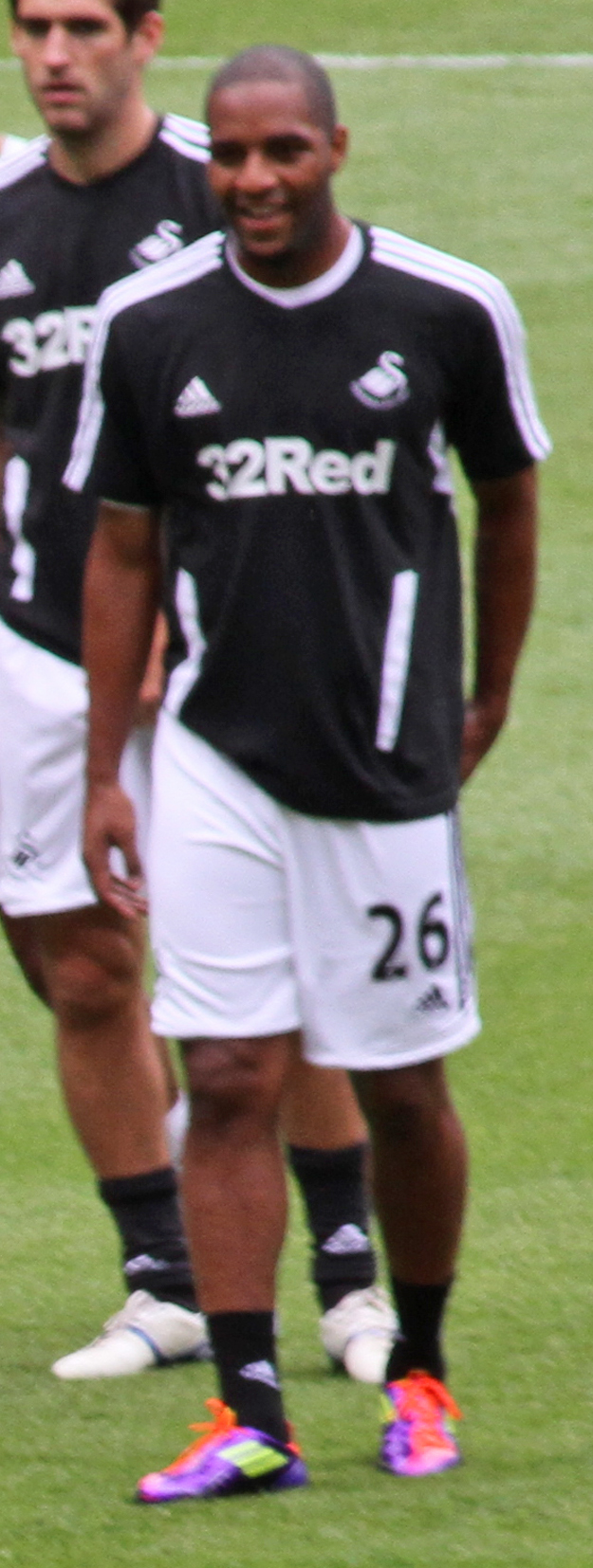
- Agustien with Swansea City in 2012

Personal information
- Full name: Germaine Hesus Agustien
- Date of birth: 20 August 1986 (age 40)
- Place of birth: Willemstad, Netherlands Antilles
- Height: 1.78 m (5 ft 10 in)
- Position: Central midfielder

Team information
- Current team: Alvechurch

Youth career
- 2002–2004: Willem II

Senior career*
| Years | Team | Apps | (Gls) |
| 2004–2006 | Willem II | 55 | (3) |
| 2006–2010 | AZ Alkmaar | 25 | (2) |
| 2006–2007 | → Roda JC (loan) | 31 | (2) |
| 2008–2009 | → Birmingham City (loan) | 18 | (0) |
| 2009–2010 | → RKC Waalwijk (loan) | 19 | (1) |
| 2010–2013 | Swansea City | 39 | (0) |
| 2011 | → Crystal Palace (loan) | 8 | (0) |
| 2013–2015 | Brighton & Hove Albion | 13 | (0) |
| 2015–2016 | Vendsyssel FF | 8 | (0) |
| 2016 | Hamilton Academical | 2 | (0) |
| 2016 | Dordrecht | 5 | (0) |
| 2017 | Global Cebu | | |
| 2017 | SV TEC | 10 | (0) |
| 2018 | Nuneaton Borough | 0 | (0) |
| 2018 | Halesowen Town | 3 | (0) |
| 2018–2019 | Barrow | 10 | (2) |
| 2019 | Wrexham | 3 | (0) |
| 2019 | Bradford (Park Avenue) | 4 | (0) |
| 2020–2022 | Mickleover (Note: The club was called Mickleover Sports until June 2020) | 43 | (0) |
| 2022 | Kettering Town | 6 | (0) |
| 2022–2023 | Hednesford Town | 16 | (0) |
| 2023 | Matlock Town | 4 | (0) |
| 2023– | Alvechurch | 1 | (0) |

International career^{‡}
| 2004–2005 | Netherlands U19 | 7 | (1) |
| 2007–2008 | Netherlands U20 | 7 | (1) |
| 2006–2007 | Netherlands U21 | 5 | (0) |
| 2015– | Curaçao | 13 | (0) |
- * Club domestic league appearances and goals as of 19:50, 17 December 2023 (UTC) ‡ National team caps and goals as of 20:31, 9 July 2017

Germaine Hesus "Kemy" Agustien (born 20 August 1986) is a Curaçaoan professional footballer who plays as a central midfielder for Southern League Premier Division Central club Alvechurch.

He previously played for Willem II, AZ Alkmaar, Roda JC and RKC Waalwijk, for Birmingham City, Crystal Palace, Swansea City and Brighton & Hove Albion in English football, for Danish club Vendsyssel FF, for Scottish club Hamilton Academical. and for Global Cebu in the Philippines. An adaptable player, capable of playing anywhere in midfield, his preferred position is as one of two central midfielders.

== Club career ==
Born in Willemstad, Netherlands Antilles, Agustien began his career in the youth system of Dutch club Willem II. He played two seasons in that club's first team in the Eredivisie, and appeared twice in the 2005–06 UEFA Cup. He signed for AZ in 2006, and was loaned to Roda JC for the 2006–07 season to gain more experience.

Agustien joined English Championship club Birmingham City in July 2008 on a season loan, with an option to make the deal permanent at the end of the 2008–09 season for a fee of €2 million. He made his first-team debut in the League Cup defeat at Southampton on 26 August 2008, and played his first match in the Football League four days later in a 1–1 draw at Norwich City. Having missed pre-season training because of a hernia operation, he did not adapt immediately to the pace and physicality of English football. He played 20 games in all competitions, but the second half of his season was dogged by injury. Birmingham manager Alex McLeish "couldn't commit [himself] to bringing him in for the money asked", so Agustien returned to AZ when his contract expired on 26 May 2009.

After his return to AZ, he was loaned to RKC Waalwijk, newly promoted to the Eredivisie, for the 2009–10 season. At the end of that season, he was released by AZ.

Agustien went on trial to Polish Ekstraklasa side Wisła Kraków in July 2010. Later he joined Swansea City of the English Championship on trial, but sustained an injury in a pre-season match which delayed his signing. After passing what was described as a "tough" medical, Agustien signed a two-year contract with the Welsh club in October. He made his debut two weeks later, coming on for Andrea Orlandi after 69 minutes as Swansea beat Leicester City 2–0.

By February 2011, Agustien was anxious for regular first-team football, and suggested that there had been interest from clubs in taking him on loan, but manager Brendan Rodgers considered him part of the Swansea squad. Agustien signed on loan for Crystal Palace on 8 March for the rest of the season. He made his debut against Barnsley in a 2–1 victory for Palace.

He made his Premier League debut for the newly promoted Swansea in a 4–0 loss against Manchester City, but suffered a hamstring injury in September, and was restricted to one brief substitute appearance in the next three months. In the 1–1 draw with Queens Park Rangers at the end of December, Agustien started in central midfield, but following an injury to Àngel Rangel he spent the second half at right back, a position he had never played before; he was named man of the match:

I was a little frustrated because I think I was playing well in midfield. But it is not about me, it is about the team. I did my best for the team. If I can help the team by filling in that position, then that's fine.

— Agustien on his unfamiliar position.

Ankle surgery in early March revealed further problems that kept Agustien out for the remainder of the season. Rodgers confirmed that Agustien would be offered a contract extension despite his injuries, and in May he signed a new two-year deal with Swansea. In the 2012–13 season was a big change for Swansea City, with change of management and new players. For Agustien, his injuries continued to haunt him, having missed five matches, due to an ankle injury.

Ahead of the 2013–14 season, Agustien, along with Alan Tate, Luke Moore and Leroy Lita, was left out of the squad for the pre-season tour, which led their future uncertain. During July 2013, Agustien transferred to Championship club Brighton & Hove Albion signing a two-year contract, however the deal was delayed for a number of days whilst awaiting international clearance which was finally completed on 1 August. Agustien made his debut for Brighton during a pre-season friendly game against Norwich City which finished 1–1. He made 14 appearances in all competitions in his first season, but only 3 in his second, which was disrupted by injury. He was released when his contract expired at the end of the 2014–15 season.

On 25 September 2015, it was announced that Agustien had signed a contract with the Danish 1st Division side Vendsyssel FF until the end of the year. Wearing number 13, the player was struck by injuries and his contract was not extended when it expired on 1 January 2016.

In March 2016 he signed for Scottish club Hamilton Academical. In May 2016 it was announced that he would leave Hamilton at the end of the 2015–16 season.

Agustien returned to Dutch football for 2016–17, signing a one-year contract with Eerste Divisie club FC Dordrecht. He was released by the club on 15 November 2016. Following his release from the club, Agustien signed with Filipino club Global F.C., playing in the Philippines Football League.

Agustien signed for English National League North club Nuneaton Borough on 27 June 2018, but left again by mutual consent before the season started. He played for Halesowen Town of the Southern League on a non-contract basis, then trained with and appeared as an over-age player for Birmingham City's under-23 team, before joining National League club Barrow on 15 November on a short-term contract. He scored twice from 11 appearances in all competitions, and then left the club when a contract extension could not be agreed.

On 21 March 2019, Agustien signed for another National League club, Wrexham, until the end of the season. He made three appearances before being released when his contract expired. He signed for Bradford (Park Avenue) of the National League North in late September 2019, and went straight into the starting eleven for their visit to Brackley Town. He was substituted after 57 minutes with his team down to ten men and losing 5–0; the final score was 8–0.

On 30 January 2020 he signed for Mickleover Sports.

On 12 October 2022, Agustien returned to the National League North when he signed for Kettering Town.

On 2 December 2022, Agustien joined Southern League Premier Division Central side Hednesford Town. In June 2023, he joined Northern Premier League Premier Division club Matlock Town, leaving the club in September 2023. He subsequently joined Southern League Premier Division Central club Alvechurch.

== International career ==
At international level, he was a member of the Netherlands under-20 squad for the 2005 FIFA World Youth Championship, where he played in two of the group-stage matches. He played for the Dutch Olympic squad that reached the final of the 2006 Toulon Tournament; Agustien converted his penalty as his team lost in a penalty shootout. He played again, and scored, at the 2007 edition, and also played for the under-21 team, including two appearances in qualifying matches for the 2009 European under-21 championships. Named in the Netherlands' preliminary 37-man squad for the 2008 Olympics, he was not selected for Beijing.

In 2014, Agustien decided to represent his country of birth, receiving his first call-up for the Curaçao senior team ahead of the 2014 Caribbean Cup in Jamaica. He was however forced to withdraw from the final squad for the tournament due to injury, having yet to make his debut for the national team. He made his debut for Curaçao 6 June 2015 in a friendly match against Trinidad and Tobago which ended in a 1–0 win at home.

== Personal life ==
His son, Demiane Agustien is also a professional footballer.

Agustien revealed he almost died from a serious car accident after his car flipped twice following a loss of control. In April 2013, Agustien was banned from driving for 12 months and picked up 39 points.

== Career statistics ==
=== Club ===
As of match played 5 September 2023

Appearances and goals by club, season and competition
| Club | Season | League | | | National cup | | League cup | | Other | | Total | |
| Club | Season | Division | Apps | Goals | Apps | Goals | Apps | Goals | Apps | Goals | Apps | Goals |
|---|---|---|---|---|---|---|---|---|---|---|---|---|
| Willem II | 2004–05 | Eredivisie | 21 | 1 | 5 | 1 | — | | — | | 26 | 2 |
| Willem II | 2005–06 | Eredivisie | 34 | 2 | 1 | 0 | — | | 6 (Note: Two appearances in UEFA Cup, four appearances one goal in Eredivisie relegation play-offs) | 1 | 41 | 3 |
| Willem II | Total | | 55 | 3 | 6 | 1 | — | | 6 | 1 | 67 | 5 |
| AZ | 2006–07 | Eredivisie | 0 | 0 | 0 | 0 | — | | 0 | 0 | 0 | 0 |
| AZ | 2007–08 | Eredivisie | 25 | 2 | 0 | 0 | — | | 6 (Note: Appearances in UEFA Cup) | 0 | 31 | 2 |
| AZ | 2008–09 | Eredivisie | 0 | 0 | 0 | 0 | — | | — | | 0 | 0 |
| AZ | 2009–10 | Eredivisie | 0 | 0 | 0 | 0 | — | | 0 | 0 | 0 | 0 |
| AZ | Total | | 25 | 2 | 0 | 0 | — | | 6 | 0 | 31 | 2 |
| Roda JC (loan) | 2006–07 | Eredivisie | 31 | 2 | 4 | 1 | — | | 1 (Note: Appearances in Eredivisie european competition play-offs) | 0 | 36 | 3 |
| Birmingham City (loan) | 2008–09 | Championship | 18 | 0 | 1 | 0 | 1 | 0 | — | | 20 | 0 |
| RKC Waalwijk (loan) | 2009–10 | Eredivisie | 19 | 1 | 0 | 0 | — | | — | | 19 | 1 |
| Swansea City | 2010–11 | Championship | 8 | 0 | 2 | 0 | 1 | 0 | 0 | 0 | 11 | 0 |
| Swansea City | 2011–12 | Premier League | 13 | 0 | 2 | 0 | 0 | 0 | — | | 15 | 0 |
| Swansea City | 2012–13 | Premier League | 18 | 0 | 2 | 0 | 1 | 0 | — | | 21 | 0 |
| Swansea City | Total | | 39 | 0 | 6 | 0 | 2 | 0 | 0 | 0 | 47 | 0 |
| Crystal Palace (loan) | 2010–11 | Championship | 8 | 0 | 0 | 0 | 0 | 0 | — | | 8 | 0 |
| Brighton & Hove Albion | 2013–14 | Championship | 11 | 0 | 2 | 0 | 1 | 0 | 0 | 0 | 14 | 0 |
| Brighton & Hove Albion | 2014–15 | Championship | 2 | 0 | 0 | 0 | 1 | 0 | — | | 3 | 0 |
| Brighton & Hove Albion | Total | | 13 | 0 | 2 | 0 | 2 | 0 | 0 | 0 | 17 | 0 |
| Vendsyssel FF | 2015–16 | 1. Division | 8 | 0 | 0 | 0 | — | | — | | 8 | 0 |
| Hamilton Academical | 2015–16 | Scottish Premiership | 2 | 0 | 0 | 0 | 0 | 0 | — | | 2 | 0 |
| FC Dordrecht | 2016–17 | Eerste Divisie | 5 | 0 | 1 | 0 | — | | — | | 6 | 0 |
| TEC | 2017–18 | Tweede Divisie | 10 | 0 | 0 | 0 | — | | 0 | 0 | 10 | 0 |
| Nuneaton Borough | 2018–19 | National League North | 0 | 0 | 0 | 0 | — | | 0 | 0 | 0 | 0 |
| Halesowen Town | 2018–19 | Southern League Premier Division Central | 3 | 0 | 0 | 0 | — | | 0 | 0 | 3 | 0 |
| Barrow | 2018–19 | National League | 10 | 2 | 0 | 0 | — | | 1 (Note: Appearances in FA Trophy) | 0 | 11 | 2 |
| Wrexham | 2018–19 | National League | 3 | 0 | 0 | 0 | — | | 0 | 0 | 3 | 0 |
| Bradford (Park Avenue) | 2019–20 | National League North | 4 | 0 | 0 | 0 | — | | 0 | 0 | 4 | 0 |
| Mickleover | 2019–20 | Northern Premier League Premier Division | 5 | 0 | 0 | 0 | — | | 0 | 0 | 5 | 0 |
| Mickleover | 2020–21 | Northern Premier League Premier Division | 6 | 0 | 2 | 0 | — | | 2 | 0 | 10 | 0 |
| Mickleover | 2021–22 | Northern Premier League Premier Division | 32 | 0 | 2 | 0 | — | | 1 | 0 | 35 | 0 |
| Mickleover | Total | | 43 | 0 | 4 | 0 | — | | 3 | 0 | 50 | 0 |
| Kettering Town | 2022–23 | National League North | 6 | 0 | 0 | 0 | — | | 0 | 0 | 6 | 0 |
| Hednesford Town | 2022–23 | Southern League Premier Division Central | 16 | 0 | 0 | 0 | — | | 2 (Note: One appearance in Staffordshire Senior Cup, one appearance in Birmingham Senior Cup) | 0 | 18 | 0 |
| Matlock Town | 2023–24 | Northern Premier League Premier Division | 4 | 0 | 2 | 0 | — | | 0 | 0 | 6 | 0 |
| Career total | | | 322 | 10 | 26 | 2 | 5 | 0 | 19 | 1 | 372 | 13 |

=== International ===
As of match played 9 July 2017

Curaçao national team
| Year | Apps | Goals |
| 2015 | 5 | 0 |
| 2016 | 3 | 0 |
| 2017 | 5 | 0 |
| Total | 13 | 0 |

== Honours ==
Swansea City

- Football League Cup: 2012–13

Curaçao

- Caribbean Cup: 2017
