= Mark Gower =

English footballer (born 1978)

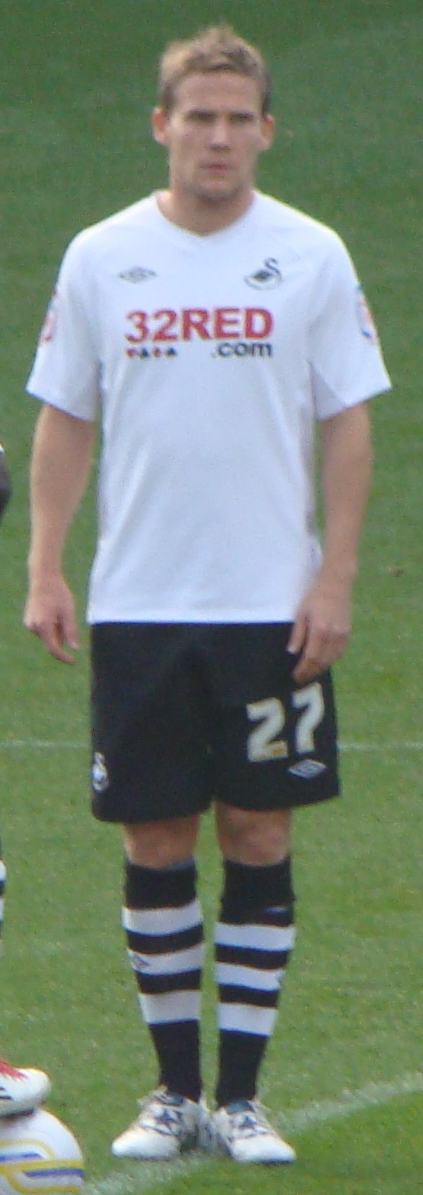
- Gower playing for Swansea City in 2010

Personal information
- Full name: Mark Gower
- Date of birth: 5 October 1978 (age 48)
- Place of birth: Edmonton, England
- Position: Midfielder

Youth career
- Gidea Park Rangers
- Tottenham Hotspur

Senior career*
Years	Team	Apps	(Gls)
1996–2001	Tottenham Hotspur	0	(0)
1999	→ Motherwell (loan)	9	(1)
2001–2003	Barnet	90	(15)
2003–2008	Southend United	203	(35)
2008–2013	Swansea City	129	(3)
2013	→ Charlton Athletic (loan)	6	(0)
2013–2014	Charlton Athletic	7	(0)
2015	Ebbsfleet United	2	(0)
Total		446	(54)

International career
2002	England C	4	(0)
- * Club domestic league appearances and goals

Mark Gower (born 5 October 1978) is an English former footballer, who played for several clubs, including Barnet, Southend United and Swansea City.

== Career ==
Born in Edmonton, London and moving to Romford, Gower began his career at Gidea Park Rangers, alongside Danny Cowley, before joining Tottenham Hotspur, where he was a member of the League Cup winning squad in the 1998–99 season. He had a spell on loan at Motherwell before joining Barnet in January 2001 for £32,500. At Motherwell he scored his first career goal in a 2–1 loss at Rangers. He joined Swansea City after declining a new contract at Southend United. He has the ability to play across the midfield, and he signed for Swansea City on a free transfer.

A midfielder, he is predominantly right-footed but can play on either flank or in the middle. Gower played for England schoolboys through to the under 18 team from the age of 14.

Gower played for Southend for five seasons, scoring 39 goals in the process. He moved to Swansea City when his contract at Southend expired. Gower failed to score in his first season with Swansea.

Before the start of the 2009–10 season, Gower revealed he would be ditching his number 11 shirt, when he chose that number all the squad told him it was 'cursed' and fail to find good form. Gower from then on wore the number 27 shirt. Shortly after changing shirt numbers he scored four goals in two pre-season friendlies. He finally scored his first league goal for Swansea in the 2–0 win over Queens Park Rangers. Since the start of the 2010–11 season under new manager Brendan Rodgers, Gower has adapted a new role in the centre of midfield and had played with eight different players this season in that very same position: Jordi López, Andrea Orlandi, Kemy Agustien, Darren Pratley, Joe Allen, David Cotterill, Scott Donnelly and the returning Leon Britton. Gower signed a one-year extension to his contract in November 2010, the extension proved Gower was viewed as integral to Brendan Rodgers plans.

Gower scored two 25-yard goals in consecutive games against Norwich City and Hull City respectively.

Gower signed for Charlton Athletic on a free from Swansea City on 3 June 2013, after a successful loan spell towards the end of the 2012–13 Football League season. On 22 May 2014, he was released from Charlton Athletic.

== Personal life ==
Gower's son, Jimi Gower, is a footballer currently with Primeira Liga club Moreirense, having previously played for the youth academy of the English club Arsenal.

== Career statistics ==
Appearances and goals by club, season and competition
Club	Season	League			National cup		League cup		Other		Total	
Club	Season	Division	Apps	Goals	Apps	Goals	Apps	Goals	Apps	Goals	Apps	Goals
Tottenham Hotspur	1998–99	Premier League	0	0	0	0	2	0	0	0	2	0
Tottenham Hotspur	1999–2000	Premier League	0	0	0	0	0	0	0	0	0	0
Tottenham Hotspur	2000–01	Premier League	0	0	0	0	0	0	0	0	0	0
Tottenham Hotspur	Total		0	0	0	0	2	0	0	0	2	0
Motherwell (loan)	1998–99	Scottish Premier League	9	1	0	0	0	0	0	0	9	1
Barnet	2000–01	Third Division	14	1	0	0	0	0	1 (Note: Appearance(s) in Football League Trophy)	1	15	2
Barnet	2001–02	Conference National	35	5	2	0	—		1	0	38	5
Barnet	2002–03	Conference National	41	9	0	0	—		0	0	41	9
Barnet	Total		90	15	2	0	0	0	2	1	94	16
Southend United	2003–04	Third Division	40	6	5	2	1	0	7	1	53	9
Southend United	2004–05	League Two	40	6	1	0	1	0	6	1	48	7
Southend United	2005–06	League One	40	6	1	0	0	0	1	0	42	6
Southend United	2006–07	Championship	43	8	3	1	5	1	0	0	51	10
Southend United	2007–08	League One	42	9	4	0	1	0	2 (Note: Appearance(s) in League One play-offs)	0	49	9
Southend United	Total		205	35	14	3	8	1	16	2	243	41
Swansea City	2008–09	Championship	36	0	3	0	2	0	0	0	41	0
Swansea City	2009–10	Championship	31	1	1	0	2	0	0	0	34	1
Swansea City	2010–11	Championship	40	2	1	0	2	0	2 (Note: Appearance(s) in Championship play-offs)	0	45	2
Swansea City	2011–12	Premier League	20	0	1	0	1	0	0	0	22	0
Swansea City	2012–13	Premier League	1	0	0	0	2	0	0	0	3	0
Swansea City	Total		128	3	6	0	9	0	2	0	145	3
Charlton Athletic (loan)	2012–13	Championship	6	0	0	0	0	0	0	0	6	0
Charlton Athletic	2013–14	Championship	7	0	0	0	0	0	0	0	7	0
Charlton Athletic	Total		13	0	0	0	0	0	0	0	13	0
Career total			445	54	22	3	17	1	20	3	504	61

== Honours ==
Southend United

- Football League One: 2005–06
- Football League Two play-offs: 2005
- Football League Trophy runner-up: 2003–04, 2004–05

Swansea City

- Football League Championship play-offs: 2011
