= 2016–17 in English football =

Football in England
- Season: 2016–17

Men's football
- Premier League: Chelsea
- Championship: Newcastle United
- League One: Sheffield United
- League Two: Portsmouth
- National League: Lincoln City
- FA Cup: Arsenal
- EFL Trophy: Coventry City
- EFL Cup: Manchester United
- Community Shield: Manchester United

Women's football
- WSL 1: Chelsea
- WSL 2: Everton
- FA Women's Premier League: Tottenham Hotspur
- Women's FA Cup: Manchester City

The 2016–17 season was the 137th season of competitive association football in England.

== National teams ==
=== England national football team ===
==== Results and fixtures ====
===== 2016 =====
4 September 2016 2018 FIFA World Cup Qualification	Slovakia	0–1	England	Trnava, Slovakia
17:00 BST		Report	Lallana 90+5'	Stadium: Štadión Antona Malatinského; Referee: Milorad Mažić (Serbia)

8 October 2016 2018 FIFA World Cup Qualification	England	2–0	Malta	London, England
17:00 BST	Sturridge 29'; Alli 38'	Report		Stadium: Wembley Stadium; Referee: Stefan Johannesson (Sweden)

11 October 2016 2018 FIFA World Cup Qualification	Slovenia	0–0	England	Ljubljana, Slovenia
19:45 BST		Report		Stadium: Stožice Stadium; Referee: Deniz Aytekin (Germany)

11 November 2016 2018 FIFA World Cup Qualification	England	3–0	Scotland	London, England
19:45 GMT	Sturridge 23'; Lallana 50'; Cahill 61'	Report		Stadium: Wembley Stadium; Attendance: 87,258; Referee: Cuneyt Cakir (Turkey)

15 November 2016 Friendly	England	2–2	Spain	London, England
20:00 GMT	Lallana 9' (pen.); Vardy 48'	Report	Iago Aspas 89'; Isco 90+6'	Stadium: Wembley Stadium; Referee: Ovidiu Hațegan (Romania)

===== 2017 =====
22 March 2017 Friendly	Germany	1–0	England	Dortmund, Germany
19:45 BST	Podolski 69'	Report		Stadium: Signal Iduna Park; Referee: Damir Skomina (Slovenia)

26 March 2017 2018 FIFA World Cup Qualification	England	2–0	Lithuania	London, England
17:00 BST	Defoe 22'; Vardy 66'	Report		Stadium: Wembley Stadium; Referee: Ruddy Buquet (France)

10 June 2017 2018 FIFA World Cup Qualification	Scotland	2–2	England	Glasgow, Scotland
17:00 BST	Griffiths 87', 90'	Report	Oxlade-Chamberlain 70'; Kane 90+3'	Stadium: Hampden Park; Referee: Paolo Tagliavento (Italy)

13 June 2017 Friendly	France	3–2	England	Saint-Denis, France
19:45 BST	Umtiti 22'; Sidibé 43'; Dembélé 78'	Report	Kane 9', 48' (pen.)	Stadium: Stade de France; Referee: Davide Massa (Italy)

===== 2018 FIFA World Cup qualification (UEFA) Group F =====
Pos	Team	Pld	W	D	L	GF	GA	GD	Pts	Qualification	England	Slovakia	Scotland	Slovenia	Lithuania	Malta
1	England	10	8	2	0	18	3	+15	26	Qualification to 2018 FIFA World Cup	—	2–1	3–0	1–0	2–0	2–0
2	Slovakia	10	6	0	4	17	7	+10	18		0–1	—	3–0	1–0	4–0	3–0
3	Scotland	10	5	3	2	17	12	+5	18		2–2	1–0	—	1–0	1–1	2–0
4	Slovenia	10	4	3	3	12	7	+5	15		0–0	1–0	2–2	—	4–0	2–0
5	Lithuania	10	1	3	6	7	20	−13	6		0–1	1–2	0–3	2–2	—	2–0
6	Malta	10	0	1	9	3	25	−22	1		0–4	1–3	1–5	0–1	1–1	—

Source: FIFA
Rules for classification: Qualification tiebreakers

2018 FIFA World Cup qualification tiebreakers
In league format, the ranking of teams in each group was based on the following criteria (regulations Articles 20.6 and 20.7):
1. Points (3 points for a win, 1 point for a draw, 0 points for a loss)
2. Overall goal difference
3. Overall goals scored
4. Points in matches between tied teams
5. Goal difference in matches between tied teams
6. Goals scored in matches between tied teams
7. Away goals scored in matches between tied teams (if the tie was only between two teams in home-and-away league format)
8. Fair play points
  - first yellow card: minus 1 point
  - indirect red card (second yellow card): minus 3 points
  - direct red card: minus 4 points
  - yellow card and direct red card: minus 5 points
9. Drawing of lots by the FIFA Organising Committee

==== Managerial changes ====
Outgoing manager	Manner of departure	Date of departure	Incoming manager	Date of appointment
(England) Roy Hodgson	Resigned	27 June 2016	(England) Sam Allardyce	27 June 2016
(England) Sam Allardyce	Resigned	26 September 2016	(England) Gareth Southgate	30 November 2016

=== England women's national football team ===
==== Results and fixtures ====
===== 2016 =====
15 September EURO	England	5–0	Estonia	Nottingham
	Carter 9', 17', 56'; J. Scott 13'; Carney 90+4'	Report		Stadium: Meadow Lane; Attendance: 7,052; Referee: Vera Opeykina (Russia)

20 September EURO	Belgium	0–2	England	Leuven
		Report	Parris 65'; Carney 85'	Stadium: Den Dreef; Attendance: 6,754; Referee: Pernilla Larsson (Sweden)

21 October Friendly	England	0–0	France	Doncaster
		Report		Stadium: Keepmoat Stadium; Referee: Graziella Pirriatore (Italy)

25 October Friendly	Spain	1–2	England	Guadalajara, Spain
		Report		Stadium: Estadio Pedro Escartín

29 November Friendly	Netherlands	0–1	England	Tilburg, Netherlands
		Report		Stadium: Koning Willem II Stadion

===== 2017 =====
22 January Friendly	England	0–1	Norway	La Manga, Spain
17:00 BST		Report	Hegerberg 26'	Stadium: La Manga Stadium

24 January Friendly	England	0–0	Sweden	Murcia, Spain
17:00 BST		Report		Stadium: Pinatar Arena

==== UEFA Women's Euro 2017 qualifying Group 7 ====
Pos	Team	Pld	W	D	L	GF	GA	GD	Pts	Qualification	England	Belgium	Serbia	Bosnia and Herzegovina	Estonia
1	England	8	7	1	0	32	1	+31	22	Final tournament	—	1–1	7–0	1–0	5–0
2	Belgium	8	5	2	1	27	5	+22	17	Final tournament	0–2	—	1–1	6–0	6–0
3	Serbia	8	3	1	4	10	21	−11	10		0–7	1–3	—	0–1	3–0
4	Bosnia and Herzegovina	8	3	0	5	8	17	−9	9		0–1	0–5	2–4	—	4–0
5	Estonia	8	0	0	8	0	33	−33	0		0–8	0–5	0–1	0–1	—

Source: UEFA

== UEFA competitions ==
=== UEFA Champions League ===
==== Play-off round ====
Team 1	Agg.	Team 2	1st leg	2nd leg
Steaua București (Romania)	0–6	(England) Manchester City	0–5	0–1

==== Group stage ====
===== Group A =====
Pos	Team	Pld	W	D	L	GF	GA	GD	Pts	Qualification	ARS	PAR	LUD	BSL
1	(England) Arsenal	6	4	2	0	18	6	+12	14	Advance to knockout phase	—	2–2	6–0	2–0
2	(France) Paris Saint-Germain	6	3	3	0	13	7	+6	12	Advance to knockout phase	1–1	—	2–2	3–0
3	(Bulgaria) Ludogorets Razgrad	6	0	3	3	6	15	−9	3	Transfer to Europa League	2–3	1–3	—	0–0
4	(Switzerland) Basel	6	0	2	4	3	12	−9	2		1–4	1–2	1–1	—

Source: UEFA

===== Group C =====
Pos	Team	Pld	W	D	L	GF	GA	GD	Pts	Qualification	BAR	MCI	BMG	CEL
1	(Spain) Barcelona	6	5	0	1	20	4	+16	15	Advance to knockout phase	—	4–0	4–0	7–0
2	(England) Manchester City	6	2	3	1	12	10	+2	9	Advance to knockout phase	3–1	—	4–0	1–1
3	(Germany) Borussia Mönchengladbach	6	1	2	3	5	12	−7	5	Transfer to Europa League	1–2	1–1	—	1–1
4	(Scotland) Celtic	6	0	3	3	5	16	−11	3		0–2	3–3	0–2	—

Source: UEFA

===== Group E =====
Pos	Team	Pld	W	D	L	GF	GA	GD	Pts	Qualification	MON	LEV	TOT	CSKA
1	(France) Monaco	6	3	2	1	9	7	+2	11	Advance to knockout phase	—	1–1	2–1	3–0
2	(Germany) Bayer Leverkusen	6	2	4	0	8	4	+4	10	Advance to knockout phase	3–0	—	0–0	2–2
3	(England) Tottenham Hotspur	6	2	1	3	6	6	0	7	Transfer to Europa League	1–2	0–1	—	3–1
4	(Russia) CSKA Moscow	6	0	3	3	5	11	−6	3		1–1	1–1	0–1	—

Source: UEFA

===== Group G =====
Pos	Team	Pld	W	D	L	GF	GA	GD	Pts	Qualification	LEI	POR	CPH	BRU
1	(England) Leicester City	6	4	1	1	7	6	+1	13	Advance to knockout phase	—	1–0	1–0	2–1
2	(Portugal) Porto	6	3	2	1	9	3	+6	11	Advance to knockout phase	5–0	—	1–1	1–0
3	(Denmark) Copenhagen	6	2	3	1	7	2	+5	9	Transfer to Europa League	0–0	0–0	—	4–0
4	(Belgium) Club Brugge	6	0	0	6	2	14	−12	0		0–3	1–2	0–2	—

Source: UEFA

==== Knockout phase ====
===== Round of 16 =====
Team 1	Agg.	Team 2	1st leg	2nd leg
Manchester City (England)	6–6 (a)	(France) Monaco	5–3	1–3
Bayern Munich (Germany)	10–2	(England) Arsenal	5–1	5–1
Sevilla (Spain)	2–3	(England) Leicester City	2–1	0–2

===== Quarter-finals =====
Team 1	Agg.	Team 2	1st leg	2nd leg
Atlético Madrid (Spain)	2–1	(England) Leicester City	1–0	1–1

=== UEFA Europa League ===
==== Qualifying rounds ====
===== Third qualifying round =====
Team 1	Agg.	Team 2	1st leg	2nd leg
Domžale (Slovenia)	2–4	(England) West Ham United	2–1	0–3

===== Play-off round =====
Team 1	Agg.	Team 2	1st leg	2nd leg
Astra Giurgiu (Romania)	2–1	(England) West Ham United	1–1	1–0

==== Group stage ====
===== Group A =====
Pos	Team	Pld	W	D	L	GF	GA	GD	Pts	Qualification	FEN	MU	FEY	ZOR
1	(Turkey) Fenerbahçe	6	4	1	1	8	6	+2	13	Advance to knockout phase	—	2–1	1–0	2–0
2	(England) Manchester United	6	4	0	2	12	4	+8	12	Advance to knockout phase	4–1	—	4–0	1–0
3	(Netherlands) Feyenoord	6	2	1	3	3	7	−4	7		0–1	1–0	—	1–0
4	(Ukraine) Zorya Luhansk	6	0	2	4	2	8	−6	2		1–1	0–2	1–1	—

Source: UEFA

===== Group K =====
Pos	Team	Pld	W	D	L	GF	GA	GD	Pts	Qualification	SPP	HBS	SOU	INT
1	(Czech Republic) Sparta Prague	6	4	0	2	8	6	+2	12	Advance to knockout phase	—	2–0	1–0	3–1
2	(Israel) Hapoel Be'er Sheva	6	2	2	2	6	6	0	8	Advance to knockout phase	0–1	—	0–0	3–2
3	(England) Southampton	6	2	2	2	6	4	+2	8		3–0	1–1	—	2–1
4	(Italy) Internazionale	6	2	0	4	7	11	−4	6		2–1	0–2	1–0	—

Source: UEFA

==== Knockout phase ====
===== Round of 32 =====
Team 1	Agg.	Team 2	1st leg	2nd leg
Manchester United (England)	4–0	(France) Saint-Étienne	3–0	1–0
Gent (Belgium)	3–2	(England) Tottenham Hotspur	1–0	2–2

===== Round of 16 =====
Team 1	Agg.	Team 2	1st leg	2nd leg
Rostov (Russia)	1–2	(England) Manchester United	1–1	0–1

===== Quarter-finals =====
Team 1	Agg.	Team 2	1st leg	2nd leg
Anderlecht (Belgium)	2–3	(England) Manchester United	1–1	1–2 (a.e.t.)

===== Semi-finals =====
Team 1	Agg.	Team 2	1st leg	2nd leg
Celta Vigo (Spain)	1–2	(England) Manchester United	0–1	1–1

===== Finals =====
24 May 2017
20:45 UTC+2

Ajax (Netherlands)	0–2	(England) Manchester United
	Report	Pogba 18'; Mkhitaryan 48'

Friends Arena, Solna
Attendance: 46,961
Referee: Damir Skomina (Slovenia)

=== UEFA Women's Champions League ===
==== Knockout phase ====
===== Round of 32 =====
Team 1	Agg.	Team 2	1st leg	2nd leg
Chelsea (England)	1–4	(Germany) Wolfsburg	0–3	1–1
Manchester City (England)	6–0	(Russia) Zvezda Perm	2–0	4–0

===== Round of 16 =====
Team 1	Agg.	Team 2	1st leg	2nd leg
Manchester City (England)	2–1	(Denmark) Brøndby	1–0	1–1

===== Quarter-finals =====
Team 1	Agg.	Team 2	1st leg	2nd leg
Fortuna Hjørring (Denmark)	0–2	(England) Manchester City	0–1	0–1

===== Semi-finals =====
Team 1	Agg.	Team 2	1st leg	2nd leg
Manchester City (England)	2–3	(France) Lyon	1–3	1–0

== Men's football ==
=== League season ===
==== Promotion and relegation ====
League Division	Promoted to league ▲	Relegated from league ▼
Premier League	Burnley ▲; Middlesbrough ▲; Hull City ▲	Newcastle United ▼; Norwich City ▼; Aston Villa ▼
Championship	Wigan Athletic ▲; Burton Albion ▲; Barnsley ▲	Charlton Athletic ▼; Milton Keynes Dons ▼; Bolton Wanderers ▼
League One	Northampton Town ▲; Oxford United ▲; Bristol Rovers ▲; AFC Wimbledon ▲	Doncaster Rovers ▼; Blackpool ▼; Colchester United ▼; Crewe Alexandra ▼
League Two	Cheltenham Town ▲; Grimsby Town ▲	Dagenham & Redbridge ▼; York City ▼
National League	Solihull Moors ▲; North Ferriby United ▲; Sutton United ▲; Maidstone United ▲	FC Halifax Town ▼; Altrincham ▼; Kidderminster Harriers ▼; Welling United ▼

==== Premier League ====
Antonio Conte enjoyed a successful start to life as Chelsea manager, winning the title in his first season at the club and earning a record number of league victories for a season, with only poor early form preventing them from also setting a new points total. Tottenham Hotspur shrugged off a disappointing Champions League campaign to push Chelsea close for the title, though they ultimately missed out – however, they ultimately finished with both the best attack and defence, with striker Harry Kane once again claiming the Golden Boot, whilst they ultimately went unbeaten at home during their final season at White Hart Lane. Manchester City improved on the previous season's finish by one place in Pep Guardiola's first season in charge, though ultimately ended the season trophyless, despite recording the third-best attack and reaching the semi-finals of the FA Cup. Liverpool made the Champions League for the first time in three years in Jürgen Klopp's first full season, though were prevented from finishing any higher than fourth by an inconsistent start to 2017, a consequence of both losing their £35 million signing Sadio Mané to international duty in January and February as well as suffering from several dropped points against bottom-half teams, in spite of going the season unbeaten against the rest of the top seven.

Despite winning seven of their final eight games, Arsenal finished in fifth place and failed to qualify for the Champions League for the first time since 1997, as fan pressure on both manager Arsène Wenger and share-owner Stan Kroenke grew. While they did win the FA Cup for the third time in four seasons, making Wenger the most successful manager in the competition's history, they endured yet another disastrous Champions League run, losing at the last-16 stage for a seventh successive year. Manchester United finished in sixth place, one place lower than the previous season, in José Mourinho's first season in charge with their failure to turn any one of their 15 draws into victories, though they did at least win the EFL Cup and won the Europa League final, winning the competition for the first time in their history and therefore securing a place in the Champions League. In only their second-ever top-flight season, AFC Bournemouth built on the success of the previous season as they secured a ninth-place finish and scored 55 goals, defying the critics who had tipped them to struggle from second-season syndrome. Much as Chelsea had the previous season, Leicester City made a poor defence of their title, despite having what turned out to be the best Champions League run of any English club this season by reaching the quarter-finals. With the club struggling, manager Claudio Ranieri was sacked in February and replaced by coach Craig Shakespeare, who steered the club to 12th place, still the lowest finish for a defending Premier League champion, but comfortably clear of relegation.

Crystal Palace had looked in serious danger of relegation early on, but a revival after Sam Allardyce took over saw them comfortably survive, securing a club-record fifth successive top-flight season in the process. Swansea City also looked dead and buried after early struggles under Francesco Guidolin and then a disastrous spell with Bob Bradley as manager, but were ultimately saved by a late improvement under Paul Clement's management. Burnley fared the best of the promoted clubs, with only atrocious away form preventing them finishing higher as they made their home-ground of Turf Moor one of the hardest places to get a point from – and secured a second successive top-flight season for the first time in 40 years. Watford, in their first successive top-flight campaign for 30 years, successfully ensured a third consecutive Premier League season – however, as a result of poor away form, a disastrous end to the season and several spells of indifferent form throughout the campaign, the Hornets were unable to really build on the previous season despite recording their first league victories over Manchester United and at Arsenal since the 1980s.

After several successive escapes from relegation, Sunderland's resilience finally collapsed and they dropped into the Championship after a decade, spending virtually the entire season rooted to the bottom of the table, as David Moyes being the first manager to spend a full season in charge of the Black Cats since 2011 ultimately amounted to nothing. Middlesbrough also struggled throughout their first top-flight season in eight years, with a poor end to the season, the weakest goalscoring record in the division and an inability to turn one of their 13 draws into victories ultimately dooming them. Hull City were the final relegated side, never quite recovering from a disastrous pre-season which saw manager Steve Bruce quit and next to no new players signed; despite encouraging early season form under Mike Phelan, a dismal run in the winter saw him sacked and replaced by Marco Silva, who steered the club to a much better second half of the season, but it ultimately proved to be a case of too little, too late.

Pos	Team	Pld	W	D	L	GF	GA	GD	Pts	Qualification or relegation
1	Chelsea (C)	38	30	3	5	85	33	+52	93	Qualification for the Champions League group stage
2	Tottenham Hotspur	38	26	8	4	86	26	+60	86	Qualification for the Champions League group stage
3	Manchester City	38	23	9	6	80	39	+41	78	Qualification for the Champions League group stage
4	Liverpool	38	22	10	6	78	42	+36	76	Qualification for the Champions League play-off round
5	Arsenal	38	23	6	9	77	44	+33	75	Qualification for the Europa League group stage (Note: Arsenal qualified for the Europa League group stage by winning the 2016–17 FA Cup. As they had also qualified there by the virtue of their league position (5th), this spot was passed to the next-highest ranked team (6th), Manchester United.)
6	Manchester United	38	18	15	5	54	29	+25	69	Qualification for the Champions League group stage (Note: Manchester United qualified for the Champions League group stage by winning the 2016–17 UEFA Europa League. Based on their league position (6th), they would have received the spot above to enter the Europa League group stage. This spot was vacated without replacement as per UEFA regulations.)
7	Everton	38	17	10	11	62	44	+18	61	Qualification for the Europa League third qualifying round (Note: Manchester United, winners of the 2016–17 EFL Cup, initially attained a spot in the Europa League third qualifying round. That was passed to the next-highest ranked team in the league not already qualified for UEFA competitions (7th-placed Everton).)
8	Southampton	38	12	10	16	41	48	−7	46	
9	Bournemouth	38	12	10	16	55	67	−12	46	
10	West Bromwich Albion	38	12	9	17	43	51	−8	45	
11	West Ham United	38	12	9	17	47	64	−17	45	
12	Leicester City	38	12	8	18	48	63	−15	44	
13	Stoke City	38	11	11	16	41	56	−15	44	
14	Crystal Palace	38	12	5	21	50	63	−13	41	
15	Swansea City	38	12	5	21	45	70	−25	41	
16	Burnley	38	11	7	20	39	55	−16	40	
17	Watford	38	11	7	20	40	68	−28	40	
18	Hull City (R)	38	9	7	22	37	80	−43	34	Relegation to EFL Championship
19	Middlesbrough (R)	38	5	13	20	27	53	−26	28	Relegation to EFL Championship
20	Sunderland (R)	38	6	6	26	29	69	−40	24	Relegation to EFL Championship

Source: Premier League
Rules for classification: 1) Points; 2) Goal difference; 3) Goals scored; 4) Play-offs (only if needed to decide champion, teams for relegation or teams for UEFA competitions).
(C) Champions; (R) Relegated

==== Championship ====
Newcastle United and Brighton & Hove Albion led the way for most of the season, and ultimately secured the two automatic promotion spots. Newcastle, as in their previous spell in the second tier, made an immediate return to the top-flight as champions despite a late scare with three games to go (and because of both Sunderland and Middlesbrough being relegated, it would be the first time since 1998 that the Magpies were the sole North-East team in the top-flight), while Brighton (ironically managed by Chris Hughton who steered Newcastle to promotion in their previous spell in the Championship) lost out on the title on the last day, after not winning any of their last 3 games – however, by this point, they had already earned promotion to the top-flight for only the second time in their history, and for the first time since 1983, after they narrowly missed out to Middlesbrough on goal difference on the final day of the previous season. Taking the final spot through the playoffs were Huddersfield Town, who won promotion to the top-flight for the first time in 45 years and in manager David Wagner's first full season in charge – whilst they did endure a poor end to the season and ultimately finished with a negative goal difference, the Terriers gradually eased their way through the play-off semi-final games against Sheffield Wednesday and then edged out Reading on penalties in the final at Wembley.

Leeds United managed a promotion challenge for the first time in six years and secured only their third finish in the top half of the Championship since being relegated from the Premier League in 2004, but poor runs of form either end of the season combined with an excellent late run by Fulham saw them fall short of the play-offs. Aston Villa's first season outside of the top-flight since 1988 proved to be turbulent as they changed managers after just eleven games – whilst they didn't look like relegation material, their failure to turn draws into wins also prevented them from making anything resembling a promotion challenge despite striker Jonathan Kodjia scoring 19 of their goals. Birmingham City's season surprised for all the wrong reasons, as they controversially sacked manager Gary Rowett in favour of Gianfranco Zola in December despite being only just outside the play-offs, only for their form to completely collapse in the second half of the season, leaving them needing a late improvement after Zola was replaced by Harry Redknapp and then a final-day win at Bristol City to stay up.

After two seasons flirting with relegation, Rotherham United finished bottom in what was a truly awful league campaign, getting through three managers by the end of November and recording the lowest second tier points total since 3 points for a win was introduced in 1981, with only a three match unbeaten run at the end of the season stopping them from conceding 100 goals. Wigan Athletic were immediately relegated back to League One, never quite getting back to grips with life in the Championship and ultimately being cost dear by a poor end to the season, as well as a failure to win home games between October and January. Blackburn Rovers filled the final relegation spot in a season marred by increasing fan protests aimed at the owners; while a late-season revival under Tony Mowbray meant they took survival to the last day, other results ultimately went against them and sent them down to the third tier for the first time since 1980; this also made them the first former Premier League champions to drop down into the third tier (Leicester City and Manchester City had both been in the third tier since the formation of the Premier League, but did not win the league until after their spells in the third tier). In their first ever season in the Championship, Burton Albion flirted with the drop on several occasions but ultimately pulled themselves away from the bottom three to ensure their first season in the second tier would not be their last.

Pos	Team	Pld	W	D	L	GF	GA	GD	Pts	Promotion, qualification or relegation
1	Newcastle United (C, P)	46	29	7	10	85	40	+45	94	Promotion to the Premier League
2	Brighton & Hove Albion (P)	46	28	9	9	74	40	+34	93	Promotion to the Premier League
3	Reading	46	26	7	13	68	64	+4	85	Qualification for the Championship play-offs (Note: Four teams play for one spot and promotion to the Premier League.)
4	Sheffield Wednesday	46	24	9	13	60	45	+15	81	Qualification for the Championship play-offs
5	Huddersfield Town (O, P)	46	25	6	15	56	58	−2	81	Qualification for the Championship play-offs
6	Fulham	46	22	14	10	85	57	+28	80	Qualification for the Championship play-offs
7	Leeds United	46	22	9	15	61	47	+14	75	
8	Norwich City	46	20	10	16	85	69	+16	70	
9	Derby County	46	18	13	15	54	50	+4	67	
10	Brentford	46	18	10	18	75	65	+10	64	
11	Preston North End	46	16	14	16	64	63	+1	62	
12	Cardiff City	46	17	11	18	60	61	−1	62	
13	Aston Villa	46	16	14	16	47	48	−1	62	
14	Barnsley	46	15	13	18	64	67	−3	58	
15	Wolverhampton Wanderers	46	16	10	20	54	58	−4	58	
16	Ipswich Town	46	13	16	17	48	58	−10	55	
17	Bristol City	46	15	9	22	60	66	−6	54	
18	Queens Park Rangers	46	15	8	23	52	66	−14	53	
19	Birmingham City	46	13	14	19	45	64	−19	53	
20	Burton Albion	46	13	13	20	49	63	−14	52	
21	Nottingham Forest	46	14	9	23	62	72	−10	51	
22	Blackburn Rovers (R)	46	12	15	19	53	65	−12	51	Relegation to EFL League One
23	Wigan Athletic (R)	46	10	12	24	40	57	−17	42	Relegation to EFL League One
24	Rotherham United (R)	46	5	8	33	40	98	−58	23	Relegation to EFL League One

Source: English Football League, Soccerway
Rules for classification: 1) Points; 2) Goal difference; 3) Number of goals scored; 4) Points in head-to-head matches; 5) Goal difference in head-to-head matches; 6) Goals scored in head-to-head matches; 7) Play-off.
(C) Champions; (O) Play-off winners; (P) Promoted; (R) Relegated

==== League One ====
After five seasons of near-misses and playoff heartbreak, Sheffield United finally ended their exile from the Championship and returned to the second tier for the first time since 2011, going up as champions and breaking the 100-point mark in the process; despite making a slow start, the Blades gradually surged up the table and into the top two, giving former player Chris Wilder promotion in his first season as the club's manager as well as his second successive promotion in a year. Taking second place in a battle that went to the final day, Bolton Wanderers secured promotion back to the Championship at the first opportunity and in manager Phil Parkinson's first season in charge, never once looking like falling out of the top six. Taking the final spot through the play-offs were Millwall who shrugged off losing in the final the previous year by scraping into the top six in their last few games and then edged past opponents Bradford City in the final at Wembley, returning to the second tier after two years.

Fleetwood Town enjoyed their best season in their history, earning an unlikely fourth place, missing out on automatic promotion on the final day before only just being edged out by Bradford City in the play-offs semi-finals. In their first ever season at this level, AFC Wimbledon surprised the critics with an early challenge for promotion – whilst several dropped points and a failure to win any of their last six games pushed them back down into mid-table and below rivals Milton Keynes Dons (who looked like suffering a second successive relegation before the arrival of Hearts manager Robbie Neilson helped push them away from the drop), the club were not once in danger of suffering an immediate relegation back to League Two and ensured their stay in the third tier would last beyond one season. Northampton Town's first season in League One since 2009 started strongly as they continued their impressive unbeaten run, but a sharp drop in form in the winter months pushed them into the relegation battle, before a late good run of form helped them move back up the table. For the second season in a row, John Sheridan returned to Oldham Athletic to mastermind the Latic's great escape from relegation, despite their miserable scoring record that saw them score less than all four relegated teams.

At the bottom of the table, Chesterfield's three-year stay in League One came to an end as their decline in form following the loss of manager Paul Cook to Portsmouth finally took its toll. Coventry City fared not much better as they hit rock-bottom and fell into the bottom tier of the Football League for the first time since 1959 and just 16 years after having been in the top-flight – even victory in the Football League Trophy and a late run of good results following the return of successful former manager Mark Robins proved to not be enough, as growing fan protests towards the owners left the Sky Blues facing a bleak future. Only two years after narrowly missing out on promotion to the Championship, Swindon Town fell into League Two for the first time since 2012 with several poor results proving costly, despite the surprise appointment of former Tottenham manager Tim Sherwood as director of football. Taking the final spot were Port Vale, who looked like shrugging off the loss of manager Rob Page to Northampton Town – however, a complete collapse in form around the winter period saw them slide into the relegation zone and they were relegated on the final day after drawing at Fleetwood, as it turned out a victory would have proved enough to save them.

Pos	Team	Pld	W	D	L	GF	GA	GD	Pts	Promotion, qualification or relegation
1	Sheffield United (C, P)	46	30	10	6	92	47	+45	100	Promotion to the EFL Championship
2	Bolton Wanderers (P)	46	25	11	10	68	36	+32	86	Promotion to the EFL Championship
3	Scunthorpe United	46	24	10	12	80	54	+26	82	Qualification for the League One play-offs (Note: Four teams play for one spot and promotion to the EFL Championship.)
4	Fleetwood Town	46	23	13	10	64	43	+21	82	Qualification for the League One play-offs
5	Bradford City	46	20	19	7	62	43	+19	79	Qualification for the League One play-offs
6	Millwall (O, P)	46	20	13	13	66	57	+9	73	Qualification for the League One play-offs
7	Southend United	46	20	12	14	70	53	+17	72	
8	Oxford United	46	20	9	17	65	52	+13	69	
9	Rochdale	46	19	12	15	71	62	+9	69	
10	Bristol Rovers	46	18	12	16	68	70	−2	66	
11	Peterborough United	46	17	11	18	62	62	0	62	
12	Milton Keynes Dons	46	16	13	17	60	58	+2	61	
13	Charlton Athletic	46	14	18	14	60	53	+7	60	
14	Walsall	46	14	16	16	51	58	−7	58	
15	AFC Wimbledon	46	13	18	15	52	55	−3	57	
16	Northampton Town	46	14	11	21	60	73	−13	53	
17	Oldham Athletic	46	12	17	17	31	44	−13	53	
18	Shrewsbury Town	46	13	12	21	46	63	−17	51	
19	Bury	46	13	11	22	61	73	−12	50	
20	Gillingham	46	12	14	20	59	79	−20	50	
21	Port Vale (R)	46	12	13	21	45	70	−25	49	Relegation to EFL League Two
22	Swindon Town (R)	46	11	11	24	44	66	−22	44	Relegation to EFL League Two
23	Coventry City (R)	46	9	12	25	37	68	−31	39	Relegation to EFL League Two
24	Chesterfield (R)	46	9	10	27	43	78	−35	37	Relegation to EFL League Two

Source: BBC Sport
Rules for classification: 1) Points; 2) Goal difference; 3) Number of goals scored
(C) Champions; (O) Play-off winners; (P) Promoted; (R) Relegated

==== League Two ====
Having lost in the play-offs just the previous year, Portsmouth shrugged off the heartbreak and won promotion to League One for the first time since 2013 and their first promotion in 14 years – despite looking set for the play-offs once more, a late surge in form from January onwards helped propel them into the top 3, taking the title on the last day. Going up in second were Plymouth Argyle, who also shrugged off their play-off loss from the previous year and ensured their six-year exile from the third tier came to an end, only missing out on the title by goal difference. Doncaster Rovers took the last automatic spot, securing an immediate return to League One – they had ironically been the first club to be promoted, but a failure to win any of their last five games pushed them into third place. Taking the last place through the play-offs were Blackpool, who also secured an immediate return to League One by defeating Exeter City at Wembley, also giving the club their first promotion since 2010 after 3 relegations in 5 years.

Despite losing their manager to Shrewsbury Town and then dismissing his replacement after only five months, Grimsby Town's first season in the Football League for six years saw them never once threatened with relegation and they secured their Football League status comfortably. Crewe Alexandra endured a turbulent season both on and off the pitch, as their strong start petered out and they were sucked into the relegation fight, which led to the dismissal of manager Steve Davis, an act seen as overdue by the fans after months of protests against the owners and their refusal to sack him. However, following the appointment of former player David Artell as manager, the Railwaymen fought their way back up the table and finished comfortably clear of the bottom two.

At the bottom of the table, after 112 years in the Football League and just three years after narrowly missing out on promotion to the Championship, Leyton Orient finally hit rock-bottom and were relegated to the fifth tier in a season that saw them change managers five times and was marked by increasing fan protests against the club owners, one of which led to the end of their final home game being finished behind closed doors. Taking the final spot on the last day were Hartlepool United, who finally saw their 96-year stay in the Football League end in the worst possible way – they had looked safe at the turn of the year but a collapse in form as well as failing to better the result of the team above them in their last game ultimately cost them their status. Having spent much of the season adrift in the relegation spaces, a late surge in form saw Newport County narrowly fight their way to safety – with a last-minute goal from player Mark O'Brien against Notts County on the final day proving to be crucial.

Pos	Team	Pld	W	D	L	GF	GA	GD	Pts	Promotion, qualification or relegation
1	Portsmouth (C, P)	46	26	9	11	79	40	+39	87	Promotion to EFL League One
2	Plymouth Argyle (P)	46	26	9	11	71	46	+25	87	Promotion to EFL League One
3	Doncaster Rovers (P)	46	25	10	11	85	55	+30	85	Promotion to EFL League One
4	Luton Town	46	20	17	9	70	43	+27	77	Qualification for League Two play-offs (Note: Four teams play for one spot and promotion to EFL League One)
5	Exeter City	46	21	8	17	75	56	+19	71	Qualification for League Two play-offs
6	Carlisle United	46	18	17	11	69	68	+1	71	Qualification for League Two play-offs
7	Blackpool (O, P)	46	18	16	12	69	46	+23	70	Qualification for League Two play-offs
8	Colchester United	46	19	12	15	67	57	+10	69	
9	Wycombe Wanderers	46	19	12	15	58	53	+5	69	
10	Stevenage	46	20	7	19	67	63	+4	67	
11	Cambridge United	46	19	9	18	58	50	+8	66	
12	Mansfield Town	46	17	15	14	54	50	+4	66	
13	Accrington Stanley	46	17	14	15	59	56	+3	65	
14	Grimsby Town	46	17	11	18	59	63	−4	62	
15	Barnet	46	14	15	17	57	64	−7	57	
16	Notts County	46	16	8	22	54	76	−22	56	
17	Crewe Alexandra	46	14	13	19	58	67	−9	55	
18	Morecambe	46	14	10	22	53	73	−20	52	
19	Crawley Town	46	13	12	21	53	71	−18	51	
20	Yeovil Town	46	11	17	18	49	64	−15	50	
21	Cheltenham Town	46	12	14	20	49	69	−20	50	
22	Newport County	46	12	12	22	51	73	−22	48	
23	Hartlepool United (R)	46	11	13	22	54	75	−21	46	Relegation to the National League
24	Leyton Orient (R)	46	10	6	30	47	87	−40	36	Relegation to the National League

Updated to match(es) played on 6 May 2017. Source: BBC Sport
Rules for classification: 1) Points; 2) Goal difference; 3) Number of goals scored
(C) Champions; (O) Play-off winners; (P) Promoted; (R) Relegated

==== National League Top Division ====
Six years after suffering relegation from League Two, Lincoln City returned to the Football League, winning promotion as champions and accumulating close to 100 points. They also became the first non-league team in over 100 years to reach the quarter-finals of the FA Cup, defeating top-flight side Burnley in the process. The season also saw the passing of former player and manager Graham Taylor in January. Forest Green Rovers won promotion through the playoffs, defeating Tranmere Rovers at Wembley in manager Mark Cooper's first full season in charge, having finished as runners-up in the playoff final the previous year. The promotion marked Forest Green Rovers' first appearance in the Football League, and meant that their home town of Nailsworth became the smallest settlement to host a Football League club.

At the bottom of the table, North Ferriby United's first-ever season in the fifth tier ended in disaster as they finished last, undone by their inability to score and having the second worst defence. Southport fared little better as their run of seven successive seasons in the fifth tier finally came to an end in the worst possible fashion, conceding nearly 100 goals and making it through not just three managers but even losing their chairman along the way. Braintree Town took the third spot on the last day of the season, only one season after finishing third in the table and losing out to eventually-promoted Grimsby Town over two legs – just one win from their final three games would have saved them from the drop. Despite victory in the FA Trophy, York City took the last spot on the final day of the campaign, suffering the embarrassment of a second successive relegation and becoming the first club to suffer back-to-back relegations from the Football League to the sixth tier; whilst their form between January and April gave them a good chance of survival, an awful first half of the season ultimately proved to be costly for their hopes, as did a staggering five results all going against them on the final day of the season.

Pos	Team	Pld	W	D	L	GF	GA	GD	Pts	Promotion, qualification or relegation
1	Lincoln City (C, P)	46	30	9	7	83	40	+43	99	Promotion to EFL League Two
2	Tranmere Rovers	46	29	8	9	79	39	+40	95	Qualification for the National League play-offs
3	Forest Green Rovers (O, P)	46	25	11	10	88	56	+32	86	Qualification for the National League play-offs
4	Dagenham & Redbridge	46	26	6	14	79	53	+26	84	Qualification for the National League play-offs
5	Aldershot Town	46	23	13	10	66	37	+29	82	Qualification for the National League play-offs
6	Dover Athletic	46	24	7	15	85	63	+22	79	
7	Barrow	46	20	15	11	72	53	+19	75	
8	Gateshead	46	19	13	14	72	51	+21	70	
9	Macclesfield Town	46	20	8	18	64	57	+7	68	
10	Bromley	46	18	8	20	59	66	−7	62	
11	Boreham Wood	46	15	13	18	49	48	+1	58	
12	Sutton United	46	15	13	18	61	63	−2	58	
13	Wrexham	46	15	13	18	47	61	−14	58	
14	Maidstone United	46	16	10	20	59	75	−16	58	
15	Eastleigh	46	14	15	17	56	63	−7	57	
16	Solihull Moors	46	15	10	21	62	75	−13	55	
17	Torquay United	46	14	11	21	54	61	−7	53	
18	Woking	46	14	11	21	66	80	−14	53	
19	Chester	46	14	10	22	63	71	−8	52	
20	Guiseley	46	13	12	21	50	67	−17	51	
21	York City (R)	46	11	17	18	55	70	−15	50	Relegation to National League North
22	Braintree Town (R)	46	13	9	24	51	76	−25	48	Relegation to National League South
23	Southport (R)	46	10	9	27	52	97	−45	39	Relegation to National League North
24	North Ferriby United (R)	46	12	3	31	32	82	−50	39	Relegation to National League North

Source: National League official site
Rules for classification: 1) Points; 2) Goal difference; 3) Number of goals scored; 4) Number of matches won; 5) Head-to-head results
(C) Champions; (O) Play-off winners; (P) Promoted; (R) Relegated

=== League play-offs ===
==== Football League play-offs ====
===== EFL Championship =====
====== Final ======
29 May 2017
15:00

Huddersfield Town	0–0 (a.e.t.)	Reading
	Report
Penalties
Löwe (penalty scored); Hefele (penalty missed); Wells (penalty scored); Mooy (penalty scored); Schindler (penalty scored)	4–3	(penalty scored) Kermorgant; (penalty scored) Williams; (penalty scored) Kelly; (penalty missed) Moore; (penalty missed) Obita

Wembley Stadium, London
Attendance: 76,682
Referee: Neil Swarbrick

===== EFL League One =====
====== Final ======
20 May 2017
15:00

Bradford City	0–1	Millwall
	Report	Morison 85'

Wembley Stadium, London
Attendance: 53,320
Referee: Simon Hooper

===== EFL League Two =====
====== Final ======
28 May 2017
15:00 BST

Blackpool	2–1	Exeter City
Potts 3'; Cullen 64'	Report	Wheeler 40'

Wembley Stadium, London
Attendance: 23,380
Referee: Darren England

==== National League play-offs ====
===== National League =====
====== Final ======
14 May 2017
15:00

Tranmere Rovers	1–3	Forest Green Rovers
Jennings 22'		Woolery 12', 44'; Doidge 41'

Wembley Stadium, London

===== National League North =====
====== Final ======
13 May 2017
15:00

FC Halifax Town	2–1 (a.e.t.)	Chorley
Roberts 48'; Garner 101'	Report	Blakeman 60'

The Shay, Halifax
Attendance: 7,920
Referee: Daniel Middleton

===== National League South =====
====== Final ======
13 May 2017
15:00

Ebbsfleet United	2–1	Chelmsford City
Winfield 72'; McQueen 76'	Report	Graham 55'

Stonebridge Road, Northfleet
Attendance: 3,134
Referee: Richard Hulme

=== Cup competitions ===
==== FA Cup ====
===== Final =====
27 May 2017
17:30 BST

Arsenal	2–1	Chelsea
Sánchez 4'; Ramsey 79'	Report	Costa 76'

Wembley Stadium, London
Attendance: 89,472
Referee: Anthony Taylor (Cheshire)

==== EFL Cup ====
===== Final =====
26 February 2017
16:30 GMT

Manchester United	3–2	Southampton
Ibrahimović 19', 87'; Lingard 38'	Report	Gabbiadini 45+1', 48'

Wembley Stadium, London
Attendance: 85,264
Referee: Andre Marriner (West Midlands)

==== Community Shield ====
7 August 2016
16:00 BST

Leicester City	1–2	Manchester United
Vardy 52'	Report	Lingard 32'; Ibrahimović 83'

Wembley Stadium, London
Attendance: 85,437
Referee: Craig Pawson (South Yorkshire)

==== EFL Trophy ====
===== Final =====
2 April 2017
14:30 BST

Coventry City	2–1	Oxford United
Bigirimana 11'; G. Thomas 55'	Report	Sercombe 75'

Wembley Stadium, London
Attendance: 74,434
Referee: Chris Sarginson

==== FA Trophy ====
===== Final =====
21 May 2017
16:15 BST

Macclesfield Town	2–3	York City
R. Browne 13'; O. Norburn 45+1'		J. Parkin 8'; V. Oliver 22'; A. Connolly 86'

Wembley Stadium, London
Attendance: 38,224
Referee: Paul Tierney (Lancashire)

== Women's football ==
=== FA WSL Spring Series ===
==== WSL Spring Series League 1 ====
Pos	Team	Pld	W	D	L	GF	GA	GD	Pts	Qualification or relegation
1	Chelsea (C)	8	6	1	1	32	3	+29	19	
2	Manchester City	8	6	1	1	17	6	+11	19	
3	Arsenal	8	5	3	0	22	9	+13	18	
4	Liverpool	8	4	2	2	20	18	+2	14	
5	Sunderland	8	2	3	3	4	14	−10	9	
6	Reading	8	2	2	4	10	15	−5	8	
7	Birmingham City	8	1	4	3	6	10	−4	7	
8	Bristol City	8	1	1	6	5	21	−16	4	
9	Yeovil Town	8	0	1	7	6	26	−20	1	
10	Notts County	0	0	0	0	0	0	0	0	Club folded before season began

Source: FA WSL
Rules for classification: 1) Points; 2) Goal difference; 3) Number of goals scored
(C) Champions

==== WSL Spring Series League 2 ====
Pos	Team	Pld	W	D	L	GF	GA	GD	Pts	
1	Everton	9	7	1	1	25	7	+18	22	Applied for promotion to the FA WSL 1. Promotion approved.
2	Doncaster Rovers Belles	9	5	3	1	19	9	+10	18	Applied for promotion to the FA WSL 1.
3	Millwall Lionesses	9	5	2	2	12	8	+4	17	
4	Aston Villa	9	5	2	2	19	16	+3	17	
5	Durham	9	5	1	3	14	10	+4	16	
6	Brighton & Hove Albion	9	2	4	3	8	13	−5	10	
7	London Bees	9	3	1	5	13	21	−8	10	
8	Watford	9	2	2	5	12	17	−5	8	
9	Sheffield	9	2	0	7	9	18	−9	6	
10	Oxford United	9	0	2	7	7	19	−12	2	

Source: FA WSL
Rules for classification: 1) Points; 2) Goal difference; 3) Number of goals scored

=== Women's Premier League ===
==== Northern Premier Division ====
Pos	Team	Pld	W	D	L	GF	GA	GD	Pts	Promotion or relegation
1	Blackburn Rovers (C)	20	17	3	0	59	20	+39	54	Qualification for the Championship play-off
2	Middlesbrough	20	14	1	5	60	31	+29	43	
3	Leicester City	20	10	4	6	44	37	+7	34	
4	Stoke City	20	8	6	6	43	37	+6	30	
5	Derby County	20	9	2	9	39	35	+4	29	
6	West Bromwich Albion	20	8	3	9	33	37	−4	27	
7	Fylde (Note: Fylde had three points deducted)	20	8	5	7	36	30	+6	26	
8	Bradford City	20	7	1	12	40	40	0	22	
9	Huddersfield Town	20	5	5	10	37	53	−16	20	
10	Nottingham Forest	20	5	3	12	27	49	−22	18	
11	Newcastle United (R)	20	2	1	17	16	65	−49	7	Relegation to the Division One North
12	Nuneaton Town	0	0	0	0	0	0	0	0	Club withdrew from league before season began

Source: The Football Association
Rules for classification: 1) Points; 2) Goal difference; 3) Number of goals scored
(C) Champions; (R) Relegated

==== Southern Premier Division ====
Pos	Team	Pld	W	D	L	GF	GA	GD	Pts	Promotion or relegation
1	Tottenham Hotspur (C, O, P)	20	17	1	2	58	13	+45	52	Qualification for the Championship play-off
2	Coventry United	20	15	3	2	55	15	+40	48	
3	Cardiff City	20	14	2	4	72	19	+53	44	
4	Charlton Athletic	20	13	3	4	55	25	+30	42	
5	Crystal Palace	20	9	6	5	48	23	+25	33	
6	C & K Basildon	20	8	3	9	29	42	−13	27	
7	Lewes	20	7	4	9	31	36	−5	25	
8	Portsmouth	20	5	2	13	31	66	−35	17	
9	West Ham United	20	1	6	13	12	59	−47	9	
10	Swindon Town	20	2	2	16	20	60	−40	8	
11	Queens Park Rangers	20	2	2	16	11	64	−53	8	
12	Forest Green Rovers	0	0	0	0	0	0	0	0	Club withdrew from league before season began

Source: The Football Association
Rules for classification: 1) Points; 2) Goal difference; 3) Number of goals scored
(C) Champions; (O) Play-off winners; (P) Promoted

==== Division One North ====
Pos	Team	Pld	W	D	L	GF	GA	GD	Pts	Promotion or relegation
1	Guiseley Vixens (C, P)	22	19	2	1	72	20	+52	59	Promotion to the Northern Premier Division
2	Liverpool Marshall Feds	22	13	5	4	66	29	+37	44	
3	Hull City	22	14	1	7	54	38	+16	43	
4	Chester-le-Street	22	13	2	7	58	42	+16	41	
5	Chorley	22	12	2	8	51	44	+7	38	
6	Brighouse Town	22	11	4	7	50	34	+16	37	
7	Morecambe (Note: Morecambe had three points deducted)	22	10	2	10	51	50	+1	29	
8	Leeds	22	7	2	13	51	59	−8	23	
9	Mossley Hill	22	6	1	15	45	72	−27	19	
10	Crewe Alexandra	22	4	6	12	31	59	−28	18	
11	Blackpool Wren Rovers (R)	22	5	3	14	37	68	−31	18	Relegation from Premier League
12	Tranmere Rovers (R)	22	1	4	17	19	70	−51	7	Relegation from Premier League

Source: The Football Association
Rules for classification: 1) Points; 2) Goal difference; 3) Number of goals scored
(C) Champions; (P) Promoted; (R) Relegated

==== Division One Midlands ====
Pos	Team	Pld	W	D	L	GF	GA	GD	Pts	Promotion or relegation
1	Wolverhampton Wanderers (C, P)	22	18	2	2	57	18	+39	56	Promotion to the Northern Premier Division
2	Loughborough Foxes	22	18	0	4	111	31	+80	54	
3	Sporting Khalsa	22	13	2	7	57	33	+24	41	
4	Radcliffe Olympic	22	13	1	8	58	36	+22	40	
5	Birmingham & West Midlands	22	13	1	8	59	45	+14	40	
6	The New Saints	22	12	3	7	65	44	+21	39	
7	Long Eaton United	22	9	3	10	54	45	+9	30	
8	Steel City Wanderers	22	9	1	12	46	62	−16	28	
9	Solihull	22	6	5	11	41	55	−14	23	
10	Leicester City Ladies	22	5	2	15	27	88	−61	17	
11	Rotherham United	22	5	1	16	45	70	−25	16	
12	Loughborough Students (Note: Loughborough Students had one point deducted twice) (R)	22	0	1	21	19	112	−93	−1	Relegation from the Premier League.

Source: The Football Association
Rules for classification: 1) Points; 2) Goal difference; 3) Number of goals scored
(C) Champions; (P) Promoted; (R) Relegated

==== Division One South East ====
Pos	Team	Pld	W	D	L	GF	GA	GD	Pts	Promotion or relegation
1	Gillingham (C, P)	22	18	3	1	104	14	+90	57	Promotion to the Southern Premier Division
2	Milton Keynes Dons	22	16	1	5	63	21	+42	49	
3	AFC Wimbledon	22	13	5	4	57	28	+29	44	
4	Cambridge United	22	13	2	7	55	35	+20	41	
5	Luton Town	22	11	4	7	44	39	+5	37	
6	Actonians	22	10	6	6	51	37	+14	36	
7	Enfield Town	22	7	4	11	31	51	−20	25	
8	Denham United	22	8	1	13	38	59	−21	25	
9	Ipswich Town	22	7	4	11	36	58	−22	25	
10	Norwich City	22	4	4	14	31	81	−50	16	
11	Stevenage	22	3	6	13	19	45	−26	15	
12	Lowestoft Town (R)	22	2	0	20	21	82	−61	6	Relegation from the Premier League

Source: The Football Association
Rules for classification: 1) Points; 2) Goal difference; 3) Number of goals scored
(C) Champions; (P) Promoted; (R) Relegated

==== Division One South West ====
Pos	Team	Pld	W	D	L	GF	GA	GD	Pts	Promotion or relegation
1	Chichester City (C, P)	20	19	1	0	100	8	+92	58	Promotion to the Southern Premier Division
2	Plymouth Argyle	20	18	0	2	104	19	+85	54	
3	Southampton Saints	20	12	5	3	52	32	+20	41	
4	Keynsham Town	20	12	2	6	71	32	+39	38	
5	Larkhall Athletic	20	11	3	6	45	42	+3	36	
6	Brislington	20	6	4	10	44	63	−19	22	
7	Maidenhead United	19	5	2	12	26	54	−28	17	
8	St Nicholas	20	4	3	13	31	74	−43	15	
9	Basingstoke	20	3	5	12	29	57	−28	14	
10	Cheltenham Town	20	4	1	15	25	74	−49	13	
11	Exeter City (R)	19	0	4	15	16	88	−72	4	Relegation from the Premier League
12	Shanklin (X)	0	0	0	0	0	0	0	0	Resigned from league. Record expunged.

Source: The Football Association
Rules for classification: 1) Points; 2) Goal difference; 3) Number of goals scored
(C) Champions; (P) Promoted; (R) Relegated; (X) Resigned

=== Women's FA Cup ===
==== Final ====
13 May 2017
17:15 BST

Birmingham City	1–4	Manchester City
Wellings 73'	Report	Bronze 18'; Christiansen 25'; Lloyd 32'; Scott 80'

Wembley Stadium, London
Attendance: 35,271
Referee: Rebecca Welch (Durham)

== Managerial changes ==
This is a list of changes of managers within English league football:

Team	Outgoing manager	Manner of departure	Date of departure	Position in table	Incoming manager	Date of appointment
Blackburn Rovers	(Scotland) Paul Lambert	Mutual consent	7 May 2016	Pre-season	(Republic of Ireland) Owen Coyle	2 June 2016
Cardiff City	(England) Russell Slade	Promoted to head of football	8 May 2016	Pre-season	(Wales) Paul Trollope	18 May 2016
Nottingham Forest	(England) Paul Williams	Mutual consent	12 May 2016	Pre-season	(France) Philippe Montanier	27 June 2016
Northampton Town	(England) Chris Wilder	Signed by Sheffield United	12 May 2016	Pre-season	(Wales) Rob Page	19 May 2016
Sheffield United	(England) Nigel Adkins	Sacked	12 May 2016	Pre-season	(England) Chris Wilder	12 May 2016
Rotherham United	(England) Neil Warnock	End of contract	18 May 2016	Pre-season	(England) Alan Stubbs	1 June 2016
Blackpool	(England) Neil McDonald	Mutual consent	18 May 2016	Pre-season	(England) Gary Bowyer	1 June 2016
Port Vale	(Wales) Rob Page	Signed by Northampton Town	19 May 2016	Pre-season	(Portugal) Bruno Ribeiro	20 June 2016
Manchester United	(Netherlands) Louis van Gaal	Sacked	23 May 2016	Pre-season	(Portugal) José Mourinho	27 May 2016
Reading	(England) Brian McDermott	Sacked	27 May 2016	Pre-season	(Netherlands) Jaap Stam	13 June 2016
Derby County	(England) Darren Wassall	End of contract	27 May 2016	Pre-season	(England) Nigel Pearson	27 May 2016
Oldham Athletic	(England) John Sheridan	Signed by Notts County	29 May 2016	Pre-season	(Northern Ireland) Steve Robinson	9 July 2016
Leeds United	(Scotland) Steve Evans	Sacked	31 May 2016	Pre-season	(England) Garry Monk	2 June 2016
Aston Villa	(Scotland) Eric Black	End of caretaker spell	2 June 2016	Pre-season	(Italy) Roberto Di Matteo	2 June 2016
Bradford City	(England) Phil Parkinson	Signed by Bolton Wanderers	10 June 2016	Pre-season	(Scotland) Stuart McCall	20 June 2016
Southampton	(Netherlands) Ronald Koeman	Signed by Everton	14 June 2016	Pre-season	(France) Claude Puel	30 June 2016
Chelsea	(Netherlands) Guus Hiddink	End of caretaker spell	30 June 2016	Pre-season	(Italy) Antonio Conte	1 July 2016
Manchester City	(Chile) Manuel Pellegrini	Mutual consent	30 June 2016	Pre-season	(Spain) Pep Guardiola	1 July 2016
Watford	(Spain) Quique Sánchez Flores	Mutual consent	30 June 2016	Pre-season	(Italy) Walter Mazzarri	1 July 2016
Hull City	(England) Steve Bruce	Mutual consent	22 July 2016	Pre-season	(England) Mike Phelan	22 July 2016
Sunderland	(England) Sam Allardyce	Signed by England	22 July 2016	Pre-season	(Scotland) David Moyes	23 July 2016
Fleetwood Town	(Scotland) Steven Pressley	Resigned	26 July 2016	Pre-season	(Germany) Uwe Rosler	30 July 2016
Wolverhampton Wanderers	(Wales) Kenny Jackett	Sacked	30 July 2016	Pre-season	(Italy) Walter Zenga	30 July 2016
Leyton Orient	(England) Andy Hessenthaler	Sacked	26 September 2016	14th	(Italy) Alberto Cavasin	2 October 2016
Newport County	(Northern Ireland) Warren Feeney	Sacked	28 September 2016	24th	(England) Graham Westley	7 October 2016
Coventry City	(England) Tony Mowbray	Resigned	29 September 2016	24th	(England) Russell Slade	21 December 2016
Aston Villa	(Italy) Roberto Di Matteo	Sacked	3 October 2016	19th	(England) Steve Bruce	12 October 2016
Swansea City	(Italy) Francesco Guidolin	Sacked	3 October 2016	17th	(United States) Bob Bradley	3 October 2016
Cardiff City	(Wales) Paul Trollope	Sacked	4 October 2016	23rd	(England) Neil Warnock	5 October 2016
Shrewsbury Town	(Scotland) Micky Mellon	Signed by Tranmere Rovers	6 October 2016	22nd	(England) Paul Hurst	24 October 2016
Derby County	(England) Nigel Pearson	Mutual consent	8 October 2016	20th	(England) Steve McClaren	12 October 2016
Rotherham United	(England) Alan Stubbs	Sacked	19 October 2016	24th	(Wales) Kenny Jackett	21 October 2016
Milton Keynes Dons	(England) Karl Robinson	Mutual consent	23 October 2016	19th	(Scotland) Robbie Neilson	3 December 2016
Grimsby Town	(England) Paul Hurst	Signed by Shrewsbury Town	24 October 2016	8th	(England) Marcus Bignot	7 November 2016
Wolverhampton Wanderers	(Italy) Walter Zenga	Sacked	25 October 2016	18th	(Scotland) Paul Lambert	5 November 2016
Wigan Athletic	(Scotland) Gary Caldwell	Sacked	25 October 2016	23rd	(England) Warren Joyce	2 November 2016
Queens Park Rangers	(Netherlands) Jimmy Floyd Hasselbaink	Sacked	6 November 2016	17th	(England) Ian Holloway	11 November 2016
Charlton Athletic	(England) Russell Slade	Sacked	14 November 2016	15th	(England) Karl Robinson	24 November 2016
Mansfield Town	(England) Adam Murray	Resigned	14 November 2016	18th	(Scotland) Steve Evans	16 November 2016
Bury	(England) David Flitcroft	Mutual consent	16 November 2016	16th	(England) Chris Brass	15 December 2016
Leyton Orient	(Italy) Alberto Cavasin	Sacked	23 November 2016	22nd	(England) Andy Edwards	23 November 2016
Rotherham United	(Wales) Kenny Jackett	Resigned	29 November 2016	24th	(England) Paul Warne	14 January 2017
Barnet	(England) Martin Allen	Signed by Eastleigh	1 December 2016	8th	(England) Kevin Nugent	16 February 2016
Birmingham City	(England) Gary Rowett	Sacked	14 December 2016	7th	(Italy) Gianfranco Zola	14 December 2016
Crystal Palace	(England) Alan Pardew	Sacked	22 December 2016	17th	(England) Sam Allardyce	23 December 2016
Port Vale	(Portugal) Bruno Ribeiro	Resigned	26 December 2016	17th	(England) Michael Brown	26 December 2016
Swansea City	(United States) Bob Bradley	Sacked	27 December 2016	19th	(England) Paul Clement	2 January 2017
Notts County	(England) John Sheridan	Sacked	2 January 2017	22nd	(England) Kevin Nolan	12 January 2017
Gillingham	(England) Justin Edinburgh	Sacked	3 January 2017	17th	(England) Adrian Pennock	4 January 2017
Hull City	(England) Mike Phelan	Sacked	3 January 2017	20th	(Portugal) Marco Silva	5 January 2017
Crewe Alexandra	(England) Steve Davis	Sacked	8 January 2017	18th	(England) David Artell	8 January 2017
Chesterfield	(Northern Ireland) Danny Wilson	Sacked	8 January 2017	22nd	(Scotland) Gary Caldwell	17 January 2017
Northampton Town	(Wales) Rob Page	Sacked	9 January 2017	16th	(England) Justin Edinburgh	13 January 2017
Oldham Athletic	(Northern Ireland) Steve Robinson	Sacked	12 January 2017	24th	(England) John Sheridan	12 January 2017
Nottingham Forest	(France) Philippe Montanier	Sacked	14 January 2017	20th	(England) Gary Brazil	9 February 2017
Hartlepool United	(England) Craig Hignett	Mutual consent	15 January 2017	19th	(England) Dave Jones	18 January 2017
Leyton Orient	(England) Andy Edwards	Resigned	29 January 2017	23rd	(England) Daniel Webb	29 January 2017
Bury	(England) Chris Brass	End of interim role	15 February 2017	21st	(England) Lee Clark	15 February 2017
Blackburn Rovers	(Republic of Ireland) Owen Coyle	Mutual consent	21 February 2017	23rd	(England) Tony Mowbray	22 February 2017
Leicester City	(Italy) Claudio Ranieri	Sacked	23 February 2017	17th	(England) Craig Shakespeare	12 March 2017
Coventry City	(England) Russell Slade	Sacked	5 March 2017	24th	(England) Mark Robins	6 March 2017
Newport County	(England) Graham Westley	Sacked	9 March 2017	24th	(Wales) Michael Flynn	9 March 2017
Norwich City	(Scotland) Alex Neil	Sacked	10 March 2017	8th	(Scotland) Alan Irvine	10 March 2017
Derby County	(England) Steve McClaren	Sacked	12 March 2017	10th	(England) Gary Rowett	14 March 2017
Wigan Athletic	(England) Warren Joyce	Mutual consent	13 March 2017	23rd	(England) Graham Barrow	13 March 2017
Nottingham Forest	(England) Gary Brazil	End of interim role	14 March 2017	20th	(England) Mark Warburton	14 March 2017
Middlesbrough	(Spain) Aitor Karanka	Sacked	16 March 2017	19th	(England) Steve Agnew	16 March 2017
Leyton Orient	(England) Daniel Webb	Resigned	30 March 2017	24th	(Turkey) Omer Riza	30 March 2017
Grimsby Town	(England) Marcus Bignot	Sacked	10 April 2017	14th	(England) Russell Slade	12 April 2017
Barnet	(England) Kevin Nugent	Mutual consent	15 April 2017	16th	(England) Rossi Eames	19 May 2017
Birmingham City	(Italy) Gianfranco Zola	Resigned	17 April 2017	20th	(England) Harry Redknapp	18 April 2017
Hartlepool United	(England) Dave Jones	Mutual consent	24 April 2017	23rd	(England) Craig Harrison	26 May 2017
Crawley Town	(England) Dermot Drummy	Mutual consent	4 May 2017	21st	(Australia) Harry Kewell	23 May 2017
Swindon Town	(England) Luke Williams	Mutual consent	5 May 2017	22nd	(England) David Flitcroft	5 June 2017

== Deaths ==
- 6 June 2016: Harry Gregory, 72, Leyton Orient, Charlton Athletic, Aston Villa and Hereford United midfielder, Nicky Jennings, 70, Plymouth Argyle, Portsmouth and Exeter City winger.
- 7 June 2016: Johnny Brooks, 84, Reading, Tottenham Hotspur, Chelsea and Brentford inside forward.
- 10 June 2016: Alex Govan, 86, Plymouth Argyle, Birmingham City and Portsmouth outside left.
- 13 June 2016: Tony Byrne, 70, Republic of Ireland, Millwall, Southampton, Hereford United and Newport County left back.
- 20 June 2016: Eamonn Dolan, 48, West Ham United, Birmingham City and Exeter City striker, who also managed Exeter and was Reading academy manager at the time of his death.
- 21 June 2016: Bryan Edwards, 85, Bolton Wanderers wing half, who also managed Bradford City.
- 3 July 2016: Jimmy Frizzell, 79, Oldham Athletic utility player, who also had spells in management at Oldham and Manchester City, John Middleton, 59, Nottingham Forest and Derby County goalkeeper.
- 7 July 2016: John O'Rourke, 71, Luton Town, Middlesbrough, Ipswich Town, Coventry City, Queens Park Rangers and A.F.C. Bournemouth forward.
- 9 July 2016: Ray Spencer, 82, Darlington and Torquay United wing half.
- 10 July 2016: David Stride, 58, Chelsea, Millwall and Leyton Orient defender.
- 13 July 2016: George Allen, 84, Birmingham City and Torquay United left back.
- 18 July 2016: John Hope, 67, Darlington, Newcastle United, Sheffield United and Hartlepool United goalkeeper.
- c.20 July 2016: Bill Park, 97, Blackpool and York City centre half, Tom McCready, 72, Watford and Wimbledon left back.
- 28 July 2016: Dave Syrett, 60, Swindon Town, Mansfield Town, Walsall, Peterborough United and Northampton Town forward.
- 2 August 2016: Neil Wilkinson, 61, Blackburn Rovers, Port Vale and Crewe Alexandra right back.
- 3 August 2016: Russell Coughlin, 56, Blackburn Rovers, Carlisle United, Plymouth Argyle, Blackpool, Swansea City, Exeter City and Torquay United midfielder.
- 5 August 2016: Joe Davis, 75, Carlisle United left back.
- 6 August 2016: Mel Slack, 72, Sunderland, Southend United and Cambridge United midfielder.
- 7 August 2016: Roy Summersby, 81, Millwall, Crystal Palace and Portsmouth inside forward.
- 13 August 2016: Liam Tuohy, 83, Republic of Ireland and Newcastle United outside left.
- 15 August 2016: Dalian Atkinson, 48, Ipswich Town, Sheffield Wednesday, Aston Villa and Manchester City striker.
- 27 August 2016: Ronnie Cope, 81, Manchester United and Luton Town centre half.
- 29 August 2016: Reg Matthewson, 77, Sheffield United, Fulham and Chester defender.
- 30 August 2016: Dave Durie, 85, Blackpool and Chester City inside forward.
- 5 September 2016: Max Murray, 80, West Bromwich Albion striker.
- 6 September 2016: Bert Llewellyn, 77, Everton, Crewe Alexandra, Port Vale, Northampton Town, Walsall and Wigan Athletic centre-forward, Dave Pacey, 79, Luton Town midfielder.
- 7 September 2016: Alan Smith, 77, Torquay United centre half.
- 13 September 2016: Denis Atkins, 77, Huddersfield Town and Bradford City full back, Matt Gray, 80, Manchester City forward.
- 24 September 2016: Mel Charles, 81, Wales, Swansea City, Arsenal, Cardiff City and Port Vale utility player.
- 26 September 2016: Jackie Sewell, 89, England, Zambia, Notts County, Sheffield Wednesday, Aston Villa and Hull City forward.
- 28 September 2016: Seamus Dunne, 86, Ireland and Luton Town defender, Graham Hawkins, 70, Wolverhampton Wanderers, Preston North End, Blackburn Rovers and Port Vale defender, who also managed Wolves for two years.
- 1 October 2016: David Herd, 82, Scotland, Stockport County, Arsenal, Manchester United and Stoke City forward, who also managed Lincoln City.
- 4 October 2016: Merfyn Jones, 85, Liverpool, Scunthorpe United, Crewe Alexandra, Chester City and Lincoln City winger.
- 7 October 2016: Peter Denton, 70, Coventry City and Luton Town winger.
- 10 October 2016: Gerry Gow, 64, Bristol City, Manchester City, Rotherham United and Burnley midfielder.
- 16 October 2016: Eddie O'Hara, 80, Everton, Rotherham United and Barnsley winger.
- 18 October 2016: Gary Sprake, 71. Wales, Leeds United and Birmingham City goalkeeper.
- 19 October 2016: Sammy Smyth, 91, Northern Ireland, Wolverhampton Wanderers, Stoke City and Liverpool striker.
- 21 October 2016: Roy Jennings, 84, Brighton & Hove Albion centre half.
- 27 October 2016: Brian Hill, 75, Coventry City and Torquay United defender.
- 2 November 2016: Ray Mabbutt, 80, Bristol Rovers and Newport County midfielder.
- 6 November 2016: Mick Granger, 85, York City, Hull City and Halifax Town goalkeeper.
- 7 November 2016: Thomas Gardner, 93, Everton forward.
- 15 November 2016: Ray Brady, 79, Republic of Ireland, Millwall and Queens Park Rangers defender, Bobby Campbell, 60, Northern Ireland, Aston Villa, Huddersfield Town, Sheffield United, Halifax Town, Bradford City, Derby County and Wigan Athletic striker.
- 16 November 2016: Len Allchurch, 83, Wales, Swansea City, Sheffield United and Stockport County winger.
- 24 November 2016: Paul Futcher, 60, Chester City, Luton Town, Manchester City, Oldham Athletic, Derby County, Barnsley, Halifax Town and Grimsby Town defender, who also managed Darlington.
- 26 November 2016: David Provan, 75, Scotland, Crystal Palace and Plymouth Argyle defender.
- 29 November 2016: Norman Oakley, 77, Hartlepool United, Swindon Town and Grimsby Town goalkeeper.
- November 2016: Brian Bulless, 83, Hull City wing half.
- December 2016: Ian Cartwright, 52, Wolverhampton Wanderers midfielder.
- 10 December 2016: Peter Brabrook, 79, England, Chelsea, West Ham United and Leyton Orient winger, Barrie Hillier, 80, Southampton full back.
- 11 December 2016: Sid O'Linn, 89, South Africa and Charlton Athletic inside forward.
- 15 December 2016: Albert Bennett, 72, Rotherham United, Newcastle United and Norwich City forward.
- 29 December 2016: Norman Rimmington, 93, Barnsley and Hartlepool United, goalkeeper, Matt Carragher, 40, Wigan Athletic, Port Vale and Macclesfield Town defender.
- 4 January 2017: Paul Went, 67, Leyton Orient, Charlton Athletic, Fulham, Portsmouth and Cardiff City centre half who also had a short spell in management with Orient.
- 5 January 2017: Graham Atkinson, 73, all-time top goalscorer at Oxford United, Harry Taylor, 81, Newcastle United outside right.
- 11 January 2017: François Van der Elst, 62, Belgium and West Ham United winger.
- 12 January 2017: Graham Taylor, 72, former England manager. Also enjoyed success during two spells as manager of both Watford and Aston Villa. Also managed Lincoln City and Wolverhampton Wanderers. Played for Grimsby Town and Lincoln City before moving into management.
- 16 January 2017: Brian Whitehouse, 81, West Bromwich Albion, Norwich City, Wrexham, Crystal Palace, Charlton Athletic and Leyton Orient forward.
- 18 January 2017: Robin Hardy, 75, Cambridge United wing half.
- 21 January 2017: Dave Shipperley, 64, Charlton Athletic, Gillingham and Reading centre back.
- 27 January 2017: Billy Simpson, 87, Northern Ireland and Oxford United centre forward.
- 12 February 2017: Bobby Murdoch, 81, Liverpool, Barrow, Stockport County, Carlisle United and Southport inside forward.
- 15 February 2017: Roy Proverbs, 84, Coventry City and Gillingham defender.
- 19 February 2017: Roger Hynd, 75, Crystal Palace, Birmingham City and Walsall centre half, Paul McCarthy, 45, Brighton & Hove Albion, Wycombe Wanderers and Oxford United centre half.
- 25 February 2017: Bobby Lumley, 84, Charlton Athletic, Hartlepool United, Chesterfield and Gateshead inside right.
- 27 February 2017: Alex Young, 80, Scotland, Everton and Stockport County striker.
- 2 March 2017: Tommy Gemmell, 73, Scotland and Nottingham Forest left back.
- 13 March 2017: Dave Taylor, 76, Gillingham and Portsmouth inside forward.
- 14 March 2017: Jim McAnearney, 81, Sheffield Wednesday, Plymouth Argyle, Watford and Bradford City inside forward, who also managed Bradford and Rotherham United,
- 22 March 2017: Ronnie Moran, 81, Liverpool left back, who spent from 1966 to 1998 as a coach as part of Liverpool's famous Boot Room.
- 28 March 2017: Paul Bowles, 59, Crewe Alexandra, Port Vale and Stockport County defender.
- March 2017: Billy Hails, 82, Lincoln City, Peterborough United, Northampton Town and Luton Town winger.
- c.1 April 2017: John Phillips, 65, Wales, Shrewsbury Town, Aston Villa, Chelsea, Brighton & Hove Albion and Charlton Athletic goalkeeper.
- 6 April 2017: Stan Anslow, 85, Millwall full back.
- 10 April 2017: Fred Furniss, 94, Sheffield United full back.
- 21 April 2017: Ugo Ehiogu, 44, England, West Bromwich Albion, Aston Villa, Middlesbrough and Sheffield United centre half, who was coaching at Tottenham Hotspur at the time of his death.
- 1 May 2017: Roy Gater, 76, Port Vale, Bournemouth & Boscombe Athletic, Crewe Alexandra half-back.
- 2 May 2017: Cammy Duncan, 51, Sunderland goalkeeper.
- 6 May 2017: Tony Conwell, 85, Sheffield Wednesday, Huddersfield Town, Derby County and Doncaster Rovers right back, Peter Noble, 72, Newcastle United, Swindon Town, Burnley and Blackpool forward.
- 19 May 2017: Corbett Cresswell, 84, Carlisle United centre half, Tommy Ross, 71, Peterborough United and York City inside forward, known for having scored the fastest ever hat-trick, Alan Williams, 78, Bristol City, Oldham Athletic, Watford, Newport County and Swansea Town centre-half.
- 20 May 2017: Noel Kinsey, 91, Wales, Norwich City, Birmingham City and Port Vale inside right.

== Retirements ==
- 9 June 2016: Daniel Agger, 31, former Denmark and Liverpool defender.
- 21 June 2016: Andrew Procter, 33, former Accrington Stanley, Preston North End and Bury midfielder.
- 3 July 2016: Mikel Arteta, 34, former Everton and Arsenal midfielder.
- 13 July 2016: Kelvin Davis, 39, former Luton Town, Wimbledon, Ipswich Town, Sunderland and Southampton goalkeeper.
- 26 July 2016: Gregor Robertson, 32, former Nottingham Forest, Rotherham United, Chesterfield, Crewe Alexandra and Northampton Town defender.
- 1 August 2016: Andy Reid, 34, former Republic of Ireland, Nottingham Forest, Tottenham Hotspur, Charlton Athletic, Sunderland and Blackpool midfielder.
- 8 August 2016: Brede Hangeland, 35, former Norway, Fulham and Crystal Palace defender.
- 14 August 2016: Jonathan Woodgate, 36, former England, Leeds United, Newcastle United, Middlesbrough, Tottenham Hotspur and Stoke City defender.
- 22 August 2016: Danny Boshell, 35, former Oldham Athletic, Stockport County, Grimsby Town, Chesterfield, Altrincham and Guiseley midfielder.
- 31 August 2016: Dani Osvaldo, 30, former Italy and Southampton striker.
- 2 September 2016: Antony Sweeney, 32, former Hartlepool United, Carlisle United and Gateshead midfielder.
- 18 September 2016: Jérémy Hélan, 24, former Manchester City, Carlisle United, Shrewsbury Town, Wolverhampton Wanderers and Sheffield Wednesday midfielder.
- 23 October 2016: Stephen McPhail, 36, former Republic of Ireland, Leeds United, Barnsley, Cardiff City and Sheffield Wednesday midfielder.
- 1 November 2016: Joe Gormley, 26, former Peterborough United striker.
- 16 November 2016: Sam Ricketts, 35, former Wales, Oxford United, Swansea City, Hull City, Bolton Wanderers, Wolverhampton Wanderers and Coventry City defender.
- 24 November 2016: Steven Gerrard, 36, former England and Liverpool midfielder, who played over 700 games for the Reds, many as captain.
- 9 December 2016: Bobby Zamora, 35, former England, Bristol Rovers, Brighton & Hove Albion, Tottenham Hotspur, West Ham United, Fulham and Queens Park Rangers striker.
- 18 December 2016: Alex, 34, former Brazil and Chelsea defender.
- December 2016: Rob Jones, 37, former Stockport County, Grimsby Town, Scunthorpe United, Sheffield Wednesday, Doncaster Rovers and Hartlepool United defender.
- January 2017: Enzo Maresca, 36, former West Bromwich Albion midfielder
- 2 February 2017: Frank Lampard, 38, former England, West Ham United, Chelsea and Manchester City midfielder.
- 1 March 2017: Stephen Wright, 37, former Liverpool, Sunderland, Coventry City, Brentford and Hartlepool United full back.
- 24 April 2017: Alan Goodall, 35, former Rochdale, Luton Town, Chesterfield, Fleetwood Town, Morecambe and Grimsby Town defender.
- 1 May 2017: Lee Mansell, 34, former Luton Town, Oxford United, Torquay United and Bristol Rovers midfielder.
- 9 May 2017: Darren Jones, 33, former Bristol City, Hereford United, Aldershot Town, Shrewsbury Town, A.F.C. Wimbledon and Newport County defender.
- 17 May 2017: Dirk Kuyt, 36, former Netherlands and Liverpool forward.
- 18 May 2017: Steve Mildenhall, 38, former Swindon Town, Notts County, Oldham Athletic, Grimsby Town, Yeovil Town, Southend United, Millwall and Bristol Rovers goalkeeper.
- 19 May 2017: Peter Murphy, 27, former Accrington Stanley, Wycombe Wanderers and Morecambe defensive midfielder.
- 20 May 2017: Xabi Alonso, 35, former Spain and Liverpool midfielder.
- 25 May 2017: Alex Manninger, 39, former Austria and Arsenal goalkeeper.
