= Tom McCready =

Tom McCready may refer to:

- Tom McCready (footballer, born 1943)
- Tom McCready (footballer, born 1991)
