= Alfred Effiong =

Maltese footballer

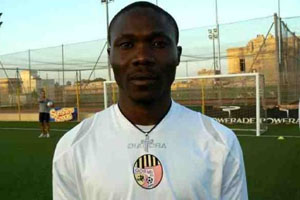

Personal information
- Date of birth: 29 November 1984 (age 41)
- Place of birth: Lagos, Nigeria
- Height: 1.82 m (6 ft 0 in)
- Position: Forward

Team information
- Current team: Marsaxlokk
- Number: 11

Senior career*
Years	Team	Apps	(Gls)
2004	Negeri Sembilan		
2006–2007	St. George's	10	(7)
2007–2008	Ħamrun Spartans	26	(10)
2008–2010	Qormi	42	(24)
2010–2011	Marsaxlokk	27	(18)
2011–2012	Valletta	26	(9)
2012–2014	Qormi	75	(35)
2015–2021	Balzan	153	(43)
2021–2022	Sirens	23	(3)
2022-	Marsaxlokk	8	(0)

International career^{‡}
2015–	Malta	37	(4)
- * Club domestic league appearances and goals as of 14 April 2023 ‡ National team caps and goals as of 14 April 2023

Alfred Effiong (born 29 November 1984) is a professional footballer who plays as a forward for Maltese club Marsaxlokk. Born in Nigeria, he plays for the Malta national team.

== Club career ==
On 28 June 2011, Effiong scored on his European debut for Valletta, netting the second in a 3–0 away win over Sammarinese club Tre Fiori in the UEFA Champions League first qualifying round first leg.

== International career ==
Born in Nigeria, Effiong moved to Malta in 2005 and married a local in 2010. In 2014, his club president, Redeno Apap, asked if he would apply for a Maltese passport, which was granted in March 2015.

Later that month, national coach Pietro Ghedin was searching for a new striker after the suspension of Michael Mifsud. Effiong made his senior international debut for Malta on 25 March, replacing Jean Paul Farrugia in the 60th minute of a 0–2 friendly defeat against Georgia at the Mikheil Meskhi Stadium in Tbilisi. On 8 June, he came on for Andrew Cohen in the 60th minute of a home friendly against Lithuania, and 20 minutes later scored his first international goal to seal a 2–0 victory. He scored his second national goal in a 1–1 draw against Estonia in August 2016. His third goal came from a header against Scotland in Malta's 5–1 home defeat in a World Cup qualifier on 4 September 2016.

=== International goals ===
Scores and results list Malta's goal tally first.

Goal	Date	Venue	Opponent	Score	Result	Competition
1.	8 June 2015	Ta' Qali National Stadium, Attard, Malta	Lithuania	2–0	2–0	Friendly
2.	6 September 2015	Ta' Qali National Stadium, Attard, Malta	Azerbaijan	2–1	2–2	UEFA Euro 2016 qualification
3.	31 August 2016	Pärnu Rannastaadion, Pärnu, Estonia	Estonia	1–1	1–1	Friendly
4.	4 September 2016	Ta' Qali National Stadium, Attard, Malta	Scotland	1–1	1–5	2018 FIFA World Cup qualification

== Honours ==
Valletta

- Maltese Premier League: 2011–12
- Maltese Super Cup: 2011

Balzan

- FA Trophy winner in May 2019
