= Ján Greguš =

Slovak footballer

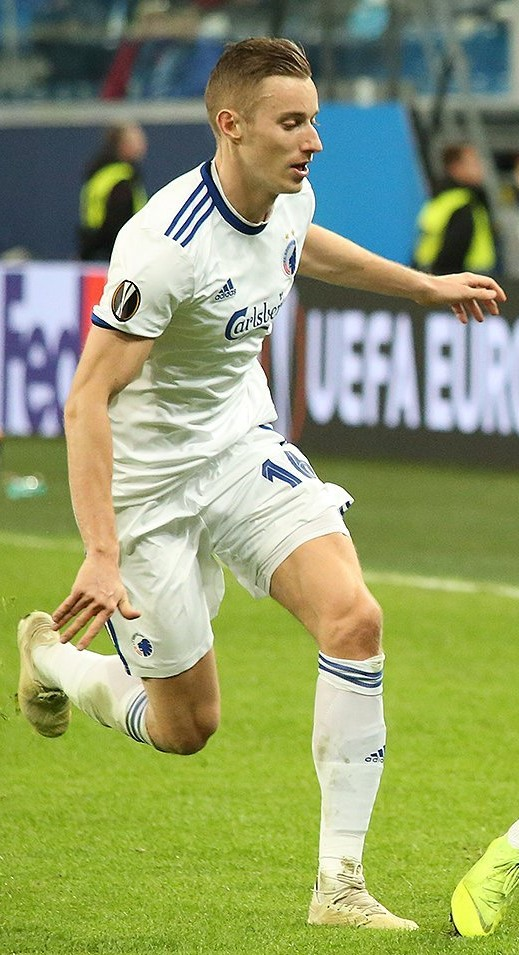
- Greguš with Copenhagen in 2018

Personal information
- Full name: Ján Greguš
- Date of birth: 29 January 1991 (age 35)
- Place of birth: Nitra, Slovakia
- Height: 1.90 m (6 ft 3 in)
- Position: Midfielder

Youth career
- 1997–2009: Nitra

Senior career*
Years	Team	Apps	(Gls)
2009	Nitra	4	(0)
2009–2015	Baník Ostrava	95	(4)
2013–2014	→ Bolton Wanderers (loan)	0	(0)
2015–2016	Jablonec	32	(6)
2016–2018	Copenhagen	67	(4)
2019–2021	Minnesota United	63	(2)
2022	San Jose Earthquakes	27	(0)
2023	Nashville SC	15	(0)
2023	→ Huntsville City (loan)	1	(0)
2023	Minnesota United	12	(1)
2024	Houston Dynamo	7	(0)

International career^{‡}
2009–2010	Slovakia U19	7	(0)
2010–2012	Slovakia U21	19	(2)
2015–2021	Slovakia	36	(4)
- * Club domestic league appearances and goals as of 22 October 2024 ‡ National team caps and goals as of 19 June 2021

Ján Greguš (born 29 January 1991) is a Slovak professional footballer who plays as a midfielder for the Slovakia national team.

== Club career ==
Greguš began playing football at the hometown club Nitra. On 20 May 2009, he made his senior debut in Corgoň Liga against Spartak Trnava at the age of 18.

After four games for Nitra, Greguš signed for Baník Ostrava in July 2009. He scored his first goal in a 1–0 away win against Hradec Králové on 8 April 2012.

In January 2013, Greguš joined English Championship club Bolton Wanderers on loan with Wanderers manager Dougie Freedman stating he would initially be part of the club's development squad. He scored on his development squad debut against Manchester City in a 3–3 draw. After one year at Bolton Wanderers during which he mostly played for the development squad Greguš returned to Baník Ostrava.

Greguš moved to Jablonec mid-season during the 2014–15 campaign. He went on to make 36 appearances scoring 6 goals before leaving the club.

On 19 June 2016, the Danish club Copenhagen announced the signing of Greguš on a four-year contract.

=== Major League Soccer ===
On 20 December 2018, Minnesota United announced the signing of Greguš as their third designated player. Greguš was selected by San Jose Earthquakes in Stage 2 of the 2021 MLS Re-Entry Draft on 23 December 2021. He signed with the club on 6 January 2022. On 17 March 2023, Greguš signed with Nashville SC until the end of the 2023 season. On 3 August 2023, Greguš returned to Minnesota in exchange for $75,000 in General Allocation Money and Minnesota's second-round pick in the 2024 MLS SuperDraft. He signed for Houston Dynamo on 31 January 2024. On 7 November 2024, his contract option was declined by Houston following their 2024 season.

== International career ==
Greguš debuted in Slovakia senior team on 31 March 2015 against Czech Republic. In the 49th minute of the game, Greguš assisted Ondrej Duda for the winning goal of the match. By the end of the year, he played for matches against Spain, Switzerland and Iceland.

Two years later, in his 12th cap for the national team, Greguš scored his first goal in the Slovak senior squad. This was in the 42nd minute of a qualifying match for a 2018 FIFA World Cup against Malta in Ta'Qali, when Greguš' right-foot shot slipped under Andrew Hogg. At that time, the score was tied 1–1, after an early goal by Vladimír Weiss (second minute), followed by 14th-minute equalizer by Jean Paul Farrugia. Slovakia went on to win the game 3–1 and moved to the second position of the Group F table, after five of the ten matches played. After the match, Greguš said that this goal was "so far, the most important" goal in his career.

In 2018, he was fielded for the 90 minutes of the final match of the 2018 King's Cup against Thailand (3–2 victory), winning his first trophy with Slovakia, after being benched in the semi-finals against UAE. Later in the year, he scored his second international goal in a friendly fixture against Morocco, as a part of their preparation for 2018 FIFA World Cup. He scored with a right-foot shot from the outside of the penalty box, after calling the ball ahead Albert Rusnák, who got the assist. Greguš only played the second half of the game, replacing the captain Marek Hamšík. Slovakia lost the game 2–1.

== Career statistics ==
=== Club ===
As of match played 8 December 2020

Appearances and goals by club, season and competition
Club	Season	League			Cup		Continental		Other		Total	
Club	Season	Division	Apps	Goals	Apps	Goals	Apps	Goals	Apps	Goals	Apps	Goals
Nitra	2008–09	Slovak Super Liga	4	0	0	0	—		—		4	0
Baník Ostrava	2009–10	Czech First League	12	0	—		—		—		12	0
Baník Ostrava	2010–11	Czech First League	21	0	—		3 (Note: Appearance(s) in UEFA Europa League)	0	—		24	0
Baník Ostrava	2011–12	Czech First League	26	1	3	0	—		—		29	1
Baník Ostrava	2012–13	Czech First League	6	0	1	0	—		—		7	0
Baník Ostrava	2013–14	Czech First League	14	2	—		—		—		14	2
Baník Ostrava	2014–15	Czech First League	15	1	2	0	—		—		17	1
Baník Ostrava	Total		94	4	6	0	3	0	0	0	103	4
Bolton Wanderers (loan)	2012–13	Championship	0	0	0	0	—		—		0	0
Bolton Wanderers (loan)	2013–14	Championship	0	0	0	0	—		—		0	0
Jablonec	2014–15	Czech First League	13	3	5	1	—		—		18	4
Jablonec	2015–16	Czech First League	25	3	7	1	4	1	—		36	5
Jablonec	Total		38	6	12	2	4	1	0	0	54	9
Copenhagen	2016–17	Danish Superliga	28	2	4	1	10 (Note: Two appearances in UEFA Europa League and eight appearances and one goal in UEFA Champions League)	1	—		42	4
Copenhagen	2017–18	Danish Superliga	21	0	1	0	9 (Note: Four appearances in UEFA Europa League and five appearances and one goal in UEFA Champions League)	1	—		31	1
Copenhagen	2018–19	Danish Superliga	18	2	1	0	14	0	—		33	2
Copenhagen	Total		67	4	6	1	33	2	0	0	106	7
Minnesota United	2019	MLS	30	1	4	1	—		1 (Note: Appearance(s) in MLS Cup Playoffs)	1	35	3
Minnesota United	2020	MLS	18	1	—		—		3	0	21	1
Minnesota United	Total		48	2	4	1	0	0	4	1	56	4
Career total			251	16	28	4	40	3	4	1	323	24

=== International ===
As of match played 14 June 2021

Appearances and goals by national team and year
National team	Year	Apps	Goals
Slovakia	2015	4	0
Slovakia	2016	7	0
Slovakia	2017	4	1
Slovakia	2018	7	1
Slovakia	2019	4	1
Slovakia	2020	6	1
Slovakia	2021	4	0
Total		36	4

Scores and results list Slovakia's goal tally first, score column indicates score after each Greguš goal.

List of international goals scored by Ján Greguš
No.	Date	Venue	Opponent	Score	Result	Competition
1	26 March 2017	Ta' Qali National Stadium, Mdina, Malta	Malta	2–1	3–1	2018 FIFA World Cup qualification
2	4 June 2018	Stade de Genève, Geneva, Switzerland	Morocco	1–0	1–2	Friendly
3	7 June 2019	Štadión Antona Malatinského, Trnava, Slovakia	Jordan	3–1	5–1	Friendly
4	15 November 2020	Štadión Antona Malatinského, Trnava, Slovakia	Scotland	1–0	1–0	2020–21 UEFA Nations League B

== Honours ==
Copenhagen

- Danish Superliga: 2016–17
- Danish Cup: 2016–17

Slovakia

- King's Cup: 2018
