= William Park (footballer) =

English footballer

Personal information
- Full name: William Park
- Date of birth: 23 February 1919
- Place of birth: Gateshead, County Durham, England
- Date of death: 19 July 2016 (aged 97)
- Place of death: Newton Abbot, Devon, England
- Height: 5 ft 7 1/2 in (1.71 m)
- Position: Half-back

Senior career*
Years	Team	Apps	(Gls)
- Felling Red Star
1938–1946	Blackpool	2	(0)
1946–1947	York City	22	(1)
1948–	Scarborough		
Total		24	(1)
- * Club domestic league appearances and goals

William Park (23 February 1919 – 19 July 2016) was an English professional footballer who played as a half-back in the Football League for Blackpool and York City, and in non-League football for Felling Red Star and Scarborough.
