= Mick Granger =

English footballer

Personal information
- Full name: Michael Granger
- Date of birth: 7 October 1931
- Place of birth: Leeds, West Riding of Yorkshire, England
- Date of death: 6 November 2016 (aged 85)
- Place of death: York, North Yorkshire, England
- Height: 5 ft 10 in (1.78 m)
- Position: Goalkeeper

Senior career*
Years	Team	Apps	(Gls)
–1951	Cliftonville		
1951–1962	York City	71	(0)
1962–1963	Hull City	2	(0)
1963–1965	Halifax Town	2	(0)
1965–	Scarborough		
Total		75	(0)
- * Club domestic league appearances and goals

Michael Granger (7 October 1931 – 6 November 2016) was an English professional footballer who played as a goalkeeper in the Football League for York City, Hull City and Halifax Town and in non-League football for Cliftonville and Scarborough. Despite playing only four times for Halifax, he is the only goalkeeper to score for the club in open play, having done so after being moved outfield after breaking his finger in a FA Cup match against Workington in November 1963. He died from complications of Alzheimer's disease at a nursing home in York in 2016.
