= Thomas Gardner (footballer, born 1923) =

English footballer

Personal information
- Full name: Thomas Gardner
- Date of birth: 17 March 1923
- Place of birth: Liverpool, England
- Date of death: 7 November 2016 (aged 93)
- Place of death: Wirral, England
- Position: Winger

Senior career*
Years	Team	Apps	(Gls)
–1946	South Liverpool		
1946–1947	Liverpool	0	(0)
1947	Everton	1	(0)
- * Club domestic league appearances and goals

Thomas Gardner (17 March 1923 – 7 November 2016) was an English footballer who played as a winger.

Gardner made one appearance for Everton in the 1947–48 season before being forced to retire due to injury.

Gardner died on 7 November 2016 at the age of 93. He was Everton's oldest surviving player at the time of his death.
