= Norman Oakley =

English footballer

Personal information
- Date of birth: 4 June 1939
- Place of birth: Stockton-on-Tees, England
- Date of death: 29 November 2016 (aged 77)
- Place of death: Peterlee, England
- Position: Goalkeeper

Youth career
- Firth Moor
- Wingate Welfare Juniors
- Doncaster Rovers

Senior career*
Years	Team	Apps	(Gls)
1957–1958	Doncaster Rovers	0	(0)
1958	Scunthorpe United	0	(0)
1958–1964	Hartlepool United	182	(0)
1964–1966	Swindon Town	21	(0)
1955–1967	Grimsby Town	15	(0)
- Boston United
Total		218	(0)

Managerial career
- Horden Colliery Welfare
- Peterlee New Town
- * Club domestic league appearances and goals

Norman Oakley (4 June 1939 – 29 November 2016) was an English professional footballer who played for Firth Moor, Wingate Welfare Juniors, Doncaster Rovers, Scunthorpe United, Hartlepool United, Swindon Town, Grimsby Town and Boston United, as a goalkeeper.
