= Alan Smith (footballer, born 1939) =

English footballer (1939–2016)

Personal information
- Date of birth: 8 June 1939
- Place of birth: Birkenhead, England
- Date of death: 27 August 2016 (aged 77)
- Position: Centre half

Youth career
- Port Sunlight

Senior career*
Years	Team	Apps	(Gls)
1957–1969	Torquay United	278	(2)
- * Club domestic league appearances and goals

Alan Smith (8 June 1939 – 27 August 2016) was an English professional footballer who spent his entire professional career with Torquay United. A centre half, he made 278 appearances in the English Football League.
