= Harry Taylor (footballer, born 1935) =

English footballer

Personal information
- Full name: John Henry Taylor
- Date of birth: 6 October 1935
- Place of birth: Gateshead, England
- Date of death: 5 January 2017 (aged 81)
- Position: Outside right

Youth career
- 1951–1955: Newcastle United

Senior career*
Years	Team	Apps	(Gls)
1955–1960	Newcastle United	29	(5)
1957–1958	→ Fulham (loan)	4	(0)
1960–1961	Chelmsford City		
1961–1962	Cambridge United		
- * Club domestic league appearances and goals

John Henry Taylor (6 October 1935 – 5 January 2017) was an English footballer.

Taylor signed for Newcastle United in 1951, and made his debut for the first team against Sheffield United in 1955. He was mainly used as back up to either Jackie Milburn or Len White. He was later loaned out to Fulham, but when he returned to the Magpies the following season, he found it hard to displace Gordon Hughes. Taylor left the club in 1960 to join Chelmsford City, and would later play for Cambridge United, before coming back to Tyneside to work at Newcastle Breweries.
