= 2018 FIFA World Cup qualification – UEFA Group F =

The 2018 FIFA World Cup qualification UEFA Group F was one of the nine UEFA groups for 2018 FIFA World Cup qualification. The group consisted of six teams: England, Slovakia, Scotland, Slovenia, Lithuania, and Malta.

The draw for the first round (group stage) was held as part of the 2018 FIFA World Cup Preliminary Draw on 25 July 2015, starting 18:00 MSK (UTC+3), at the Konstantinovsky Palace in Strelna, Saint Petersburg, Russia.

The group winners, England, qualified directly for the 2018 FIFA World Cup. The group runners-up, Slovakia, were eliminated as the worst runners-up.

== Standings ==
2018 FIFA World Cup qualification tiebreakers
In league format, the ranking of teams in each group was based on the following criteria (regulations Articles 20.6 and 20.7):
1. Points (3 points for a win, 1 point for a draw, 0 points for a loss)
2. Overall goal difference
3. Overall goals scored
4. Points in matches between tied teams
5. Goal difference in matches between tied teams
6. Goals scored in matches between tied teams
7. Away goals scored in matches between tied teams (if the tie was only between two teams in home-and-away league format)
8. Fair play points
  - first yellow card: minus 1 point
  - indirect red card (second yellow card): minus 3 points
  - direct red card: minus 4 points
  - yellow card and direct red card: minus 5 points
9. Drawing of lots by the FIFA Organising Committee

Pos	Team	Pld	W	D	L	GF	GA	GD	Pts	Qualification	England	Slovakia	Scotland	Slovenia	Lithuania	Malta
1	England	10	8	2	0	18	3	+15	26	Qualification to 2018 FIFA World Cup	—	2–1	3–0	1–0	2–0	2–0
2	Slovakia	10	6	0	4	17	7	+10	18		0–1	—	3–0	1–0	4–0	3–0
3	Scotland	10	5	3	2	17	12	+5	18		2–2	1–0	—	1–0	1–1	2–0
4	Slovenia	10	4	3	3	12	7	+5	15		0–0	1–0	2–2	—	4–0	2–0
5	Lithuania	10	1	3	6	7	20	−13	6		0–1	1–2	0–3	2–2	—	2–0
6	Malta	10	0	1	9	3	25	−22	1		0–4	1–3	1–5	0–1	1–1	—

Source: FIFA
Rules for classification: Qualification tiebreakers

== Matches ==
The fixture list was confirmed by UEFA on 26 July 2015, the day following the draw. Times are CET/CEST, (Note: CET (UTC+1) for matches on 11 November 2016, and CEST (UTC+2) for all other matches.) as listed by UEFA (local times are in parentheses).

4 September 2016
18:00
(19:00 UTC+3)

Lithuania	2–2	Slovenia
Černych 32'; Slivka 34'	Report (FIFA); Report (UEFA)	Krhin 77'; Cesar 90+3'

LFF Stadium, Vilnius
Attendance: 4,114
Referee: Artur Soares Dias (Portugal)
4 September 2016
18:00
(18:00 UTC+2)

Slovakia	0–1	England
	Report (FIFA); Report (UEFA)	Lallana 90+5'

Štadión Antona Malatinského, Trnava
Attendance: 18,111
Referee: Milorad Mažić (Serbia)
4 September 2016
20:45
(20:45 UTC+2)

Malta	1–5	Scotland
Effiong 14'	Report (FIFA); Report (UEFA)	Snodgrass 10', 61' (pen.), 84'; C. Martin 53'; S. Fletcher 78'

National Stadium, Ta' Qali
Attendance: 15,069
Referee: Yevhen Aranovsky (Ukraine)

8 October 2016
18:00
(17:00 UTC+1)

England	2–0	Malta
Sturridge 29'; Alli 38'	Report (FIFA); Report (UEFA)

Wembley Stadium, London
Attendance: 81,718
Referee: Stefan Johannesson (Sweden)
8 October 2016
20:45
(19:45 UTC+1)

Scotland	1–1	Lithuania
McArthur 89'	Report (FIFA); Report (UEFA)	Černych 59'

Hampden Park, Glasgow
Attendance: 35,966
Referee: Tobias Stieler (Germany)
8 October 2016
20:45
(20:45 UTC+2)

Slovenia	1–0	Slovakia
Kronaveter 74'	Report (FIFA); Report (UEFA)

Stožice Stadium, Ljubljana
Attendance: 10,492
Referee: Nicola Rizzoli (Italy)

11 October 2016
20:45
(21:45 UTC+3)

Lithuania	2–0	Malta
Černych 76'; Novikovas 84' (pen.)	Report (FIFA); Report (UEFA)

LFF Stadium, Vilnius
Attendance: 5,067
Referee: Jesús Gil Manzano (Spain)
11 October 2016
20:45
(20:45 UTC+2)

Slovakia	3–0	Scotland
Mak 18', 56'; Nemec 68'	Report (FIFA); Report (UEFA)

Štadión Antona Malatinského, Trnava
Attendance: 11,098
Referee: Martin Strömbergsson (Sweden)
11 October 2016
20:45
(20:45 UTC+2)

Slovenia	0–0	England
	Report (FIFA); Report (UEFA)

Stožice Stadium, Ljubljana
Attendance: 13,274
Referee: Deniz Aytekin (Germany)

11 November 2016
20:45
(19:45 UTC±0)

England	3–0	Scotland
Sturridge 23'; Lallana 50'; Cahill 61'	Report (FIFA); Report (UEFA)

Wembley Stadium, London
Attendance: 87,258
Referee: Cüneyt Çakır (Turkey)
11 November 2016
20:45
(20:45 UTC+1)

Malta	0–1	Slovenia
	Report (FIFA); Report (UEFA)	Verbič 47'

National Stadium, Ta' Qali
Attendance: 4,207
Referee: Paweł Raczkowski (Poland)
11 November 2016
20:45
(20:45 UTC+1)

Slovakia	4–0	Lithuania
Nemec 12'; Kucka 15'; Škrtel 36'; Hamšík 86'	Report (FIFA); Report (UEFA)

Štadión Antona Malatinského, Trnava
Attendance: 9,653
Referee: Anastasios Sidiropoulos (Greece)

26 March 2017
18:00
(17:00 UTC+1)

England	2–0	Lithuania
Defoe 22'; Vardy 66'	Report (FIFA); Report (UEFA)

Wembley Stadium, London
Attendance: 77,690
Referee: Ruddy Buquet (France)
26 March 2017
20:45
(20:45 UTC+2)

Malta	1–3	Slovakia
Farrugia 14'	Report (FIFA); Report (UEFA)	Weiss 2'; Greguš 41'; Nemec 84'

National Stadium, Ta' Qali
Attendance: 4,980
Referee: Ali Palabıyık (Turkey)
26 March 2017
20:45
(19:45 UTC+1)

Scotland	1–0	Slovenia
C. Martin 88'	Report (FIFA); Report (UEFA)

Hampden Park, Glasgow
Attendance: 20,435
Referee: Björn Kuipers (Netherlands)

10 June 2017
18:00
(17:00 UTC+1)

Scotland	2–2	England
Griffiths 87', 90'	Report (FIFA); Report (UEFA)	Oxlade-Chamberlain 70'; Kane 90+3'

Hampden Park, Glasgow
Attendance: 48,520
Referee: Paolo Tagliavento (Italy)
10 June 2017
18:00
(18:00 UTC+2)

Slovenia	2–0	Malta
Iličić 45+2'; Novaković 84'	Report (FIFA); Report (UEFA)

Stožice Stadium, Ljubljana
Attendance: 7,839
Referee: Simon Lee Evans (Wales)
10 June 2017
20:45
(21:45 UTC+3)

Lithuania	1–2	Slovakia
Novikovas 90+3'	Report (FIFA); Report (UEFA)	Weiss 32'; Hamšík 58'

LFF Stadium, Vilnius
Attendance: 4,083
Referee: Manuel Gräfe (Germany)

1 September 2017
20:45
(21:45 UTC+3)

Lithuania	0–3	Scotland
	Report (FIFA); Report (UEFA)	Armstrong 25'; Robertson 30'; McArthur 72'

LFF Stadium, Vilnius
Attendance: 5,067
Referee: Carlos del Cerro Grande (Spain)
1 September 2017
20:45
(20:45 UTC+2)

Malta	0–4	England
	Report (FIFA); Report (UEFA)	Kane 53', 90+2'; Bertrand 86'; Welbeck 90+1'

National Stadium, Ta' Qali
Attendance: 16,994
Referee: Artur Soares Dias (Portugal)
1 September 2017
20:45
(20:45 UTC+2)

Slovakia	1–0	Slovenia
Mevlja 81' (o.g.)	Report (FIFA); Report (UEFA)

Štadión Antona Malatinského, Trnava
Attendance: 16,896
Referee: Antonio Mateu Lahoz (Spain)

4 September 2017
20:45
(19:45 UTC+1)

England	2–1	Slovakia
Dier 37'; Rashford 59'	Report (FIFA); Report (UEFA)	Lobotka 3'

Wembley Stadium, London
Attendance: 67,823
Referee: Clément Turpin (France)
4 September 2017
20:45
(19:45 UTC+1)

Scotland	2–0	Malta
Berra 9'; Griffiths 49'	Report (FIFA); Report (UEFA)

Hampden Park, Glasgow
Attendance: 26,371
Referee: Jakob Kehlet (Denmark)
4 September 2017
20:45
(20:45 UTC+2)

Slovenia	4–0	Lithuania
Iličić 25' (pen.), 61' (pen.); Verbič 82'; Birsa 90'	Report (FIFA); Report (UEFA)

Stožice Stadium, Ljubljana
Attendance: 6,230
Referee: István Kovács (Romania)

5 October 2017
20:45
(19:45 UTC+1)

England	1–0	Slovenia
Kane 90+4'	Report (FIFA); Report (UEFA)

Wembley Stadium, London
Attendance: 61,598
Referee: Felix Zwayer (Germany)
5 October 2017
20:45
(20:45 UTC+2)

Malta	1–1	Lithuania
Agius 23'	Report (FIFA); Report (UEFA)	Slivka 53'

National Stadium, Ta' Qali
Attendance: 3,431
Referee: Zaven Hovhannisyan (Armenia)
5 October 2017
20:45
(19:45 UTC+1)

Scotland	1–0	Slovakia
Škrtel 89' (o.g.)	Report (FIFA); Report (UEFA)

Hampden Park, Glasgow
Attendance: 46,773
Referee: Milorad Mažić (Serbia)

8 October 2017
18:00
(19:00 UTC+3)

Lithuania	0–1	England
	Report (FIFA); Report (UEFA)	Kane 27' (pen.)

LFF Stadium, Vilnius
Attendance: 5,067
Referee: Orel Grinfeeld (Israel)
8 October 2017
18:00
(18:00 UTC+2)

Slovakia	3–0	Malta
Nemec 33', 62'; Duda 69'	Report (FIFA); Report (UEFA)

Štadión Antona Malatinského, Trnava
Attendance: 17,774
Referee: Paolo Mazzoleni (Italy)
8 October 2017
18:00
(18:00 UTC+2)

Slovenia	2–2	Scotland
Bezjak 52', 72'	Report (FIFA); Report (UEFA)	Griffiths 32'; Snodgrass 88'

Stožice Stadium, Ljubljana
Attendance: 11,123
Referee: Jonas Eriksson (Sweden)

== Goalscorers ==
There were 74 goals scored in 30 matches, for an average of 2.47 goals per match.

5 goals

- (England) Harry Kane
- (Slovakia) Adam Nemec

4 goals

- (Scotland) Leigh Griffiths
- (Scotland) Robert Snodgrass

3 goals

- (Lithuania) Fiodor Černych
- (Slovenia) Josip Iličić

2 goals

- (England) Adam Lallana
- (England) Daniel Sturridge
- (Lithuania) Arvydas Novikovas
- (Lithuania) Vykintas Slivka
- (Scotland) Chris Martin
- (Scotland) James McArthur
- (Slovakia) Marek Hamšík
- (Slovakia) Róbert Mak
- (Slovakia) Vladimír Weiss
- (Slovenia) Roman Bezjak
- (Slovenia) Benjamin Verbič

1 goal

- (England) Dele Alli
- (England) Ryan Bertrand
- (England) Gary Cahill
- (England) Jermain Defoe
- (England) Eric Dier
- (England) Alex Oxlade-Chamberlain
- (England) Marcus Rashford
- (England) Jamie Vardy
- (England) Danny Welbeck
- (Malta) Andrei Agius
- (Malta) Alfred Effiong
- (Malta) Jean Paul Farrugia
- (Scotland) Stuart Armstrong
- (Scotland) Christophe Berra
- (Scotland) Steven Fletcher
- (Scotland) Andy Robertson
- (Slovakia) Ondrej Duda
- (Slovakia) Ján Greguš
- (Slovakia) Juraj Kucka
- (Slovakia) Stanislav Lobotka
- (Slovakia) Martin Škrtel
- (Slovenia) Valter Birsa
- (Slovenia) Boštjan Cesar
- (Slovenia) Rene Krhin
- (Slovenia) Rok Kronaveter
- (Slovenia) Milivoje Novaković

1 own goal

- (Slovakia) Martin Škrtel (against Scotland)
- (Slovenia) Miha Mevlja (against Slovakia)

== Discipline ==
A player was automatically suspended for the next match for the following offences:

- Receiving a red card (red card suspensions could be extended for serious offences)
- Receiving two yellow cards in two different matches (yellow card suspensions were carried forward to the play-offs, but not the finals or any other future international matches)

The following suspensions were served during the qualifying matches:

Player	Team	Offence(s)	Suspended for match(es)
Mišo Brečko	Slovenia	(red card) vs Ukraine in UEFA Euro 2016 qualifying (17 November 2015)	vs Lithuania (4 September 2016)
Jonathan Caruana	Malta	(red card) vs Scotland (4 September 2016)	vs England (8 October 2016)
Luke Gambin	Malta	(red card) vs Scotland (4 September 2016)	vs England (8 October 2016) vs Lithuania (11 October 2016)
Martin Škrtel	Slovakia	(yellow card) (yellow-red card) vs England (4 September 2016)	vs Slovenia (8 October 2016)
Tomáš Hubočan	Slovakia	(yellow card) vs England (4 September 2016); (yellow card) vs Slovenia (8 October 2016)	vs Scotland (11 October 2016)
Jonathan Caruana	Malta	(red card) vs Lithuania (11 October 2016)	vs Slovenia (11 November 2016) vs Slovakia (26 March 2017)
Aljaž Struna	Slovenia	(yellow card) vs Slovakia (8 October 2016); (yellow card) vs England (11 October 2016)	vs Malta (11 November 2016)
Gary Cahill	England	(yellow card) vs Slovenia (11 October 2016); (yellow card) vs Scotland (11 November 2016)	vs Lithuania (26 March 2017)
Georgas Freidgeimas	Lithuania	(yellow card) vs Scotland (8 October 2016); (yellow card) vs Slovakia (11 November 2016)	vs England (26 March 2017)
Andrei Agius	Malta	(yellow card) vs Lithuania (11 October 2016); (yellow card) vs Slovenia (11 November 2016)	vs Slovakia (26 March 2017)
Egidijus Vaitkūnas	Lithuania	(yellow card) vs Scotland (8 October 2016); (yellow card) vs England (26 March 2017)	vs Slovakia (10 June 2017)
Artūras Žulpa	Lithuania	(yellow card) vs Slovenia (4 September 2016); (yellow card) vs England (26 March 2017)	vs Slovakia (10 June 2017)
Jean Paul Farrugia	Malta	(yellow card) (yellow-red card) vs Slovakia (26 March 2017)	vs Slovenia (10 June 2017)
Juraj Kucka	Slovakia	(yellow card) vs Slovenia (8 October 2016); (yellow card) vs Malta (26 March 2017)	vs Lithuania (10 June 2017)
Adam Nemec	Slovakia	(yellow card) (yellow-red card) vs Malta (26 March 2017)	vs Lithuania (10 June 2017)
Valter Birsa	Slovenia	(yellow card) vs England (11 October 2016); (yellow card) vs Scotland (26 March 2017)	vs Malta (10 June 2017)
Boštjan Cesar	Slovenia	(yellow card) vs Slovakia (8 October 2016); (yellow card) vs Scotland (26 March 2017)	vs Malta (10 June 2017)
Miral Samardžić	Slovenia	(yellow card) vs Lithuania (4 September 2016); (yellow card) vs Scotland (26 March 2017)	vs Malta (10 June 2017)
Eric Dier	England	(yellow card) vs Slovenia (11 October 2016); (yellow card) vs Scotland (10 June 2017)	vs Malta (1 September 2017)
Nerijus Valskis	Lithuania	(yellow card) vs Malta (11 October 2016); (yellow card) vs Slovakia (10 June 2017)	vs Scotland (1 September 2017)
Alfred Effiong	Malta	(yellow card) vs Scotland (4 September 2016); (yellow card) vs Slovenia (10 June 2017)	vs England (1 September 2017)
Paul Fenech	Malta	(yellow card) vs Scotland (4 September 2016); (yellow card) vs Slovenia (10 June 2017)	vs England (1 September 2017)
Ján Ďurica	Slovakia	(yellow card) vs Slovenia (8 October 2016); (yellow card) vs Lithuania (10 June 2017)	vs Slovenia (1 September 2017)
Martin Škrtel	Slovakia	(yellow card) vs Malta (26 March 2017); (yellow card) vs Lithuania (10 June 2017)	vs Slovenia (1 September 2017)
Linas Klimavičius	Lithuania	(yellow card) vs Slovakia (10 June 2017); (yellow card) vs Slovenia (4 September 2017)	vs Malta (5 October 2017)
Darvydas Šernas	Lithuania	(yellow card) vs Slovakia (10 June 2017); (yellow card) vs Slovenia (4 September 2017)	vs Malta (5 October 2017)
Ryan Fenech	Malta	(yellow card) vs Slovenia (10 June 2017); (yellow card) vs Scotland (4 September 2017)	vs Lithuania (5 October 2017)
Milan Škriniar	Slovakia	(yellow card) vs Lithuania (10 June 2017); (yellow card) vs England (4 September 2017)	vs Scotland (5 October 2017)
Mantas Kuklys	Lithuania	(yellow card) vs Scotland (8 October 2016); (yellow card) vs Malta (5 October 2017)	vs England (8 October 2017)
Zach Muscat	Malta	(yellow card) vs Slovenia (11 November 2016); (yellow card) vs Lithuania (5 October 2017)	vs Slovakia (8 October 2017)
Róbert Mak	Slovakia	(yellow card) (yellow-red card) vs Scotland (5 October 2017)	vs Malta (8 October 2017)
Valter Birsa	Slovenia	(yellow card) vs Slovakia (1 September 2017); (yellow card) vs England (5 October 2017)	vs Scotland (8 October 2017)
Rene Krhin	Slovenia	(yellow card) vs Slovakia (8 October 2016); (yellow card) vs England (5 October 2017)	vs Scotland (8 October 2017)
