= Anton Malatinský Stadium =

Football stadium located in Trnava, Slovakia

City Arena – Anton Malatinský Stadium
- City Aréna – Štadión Antona Malatinského
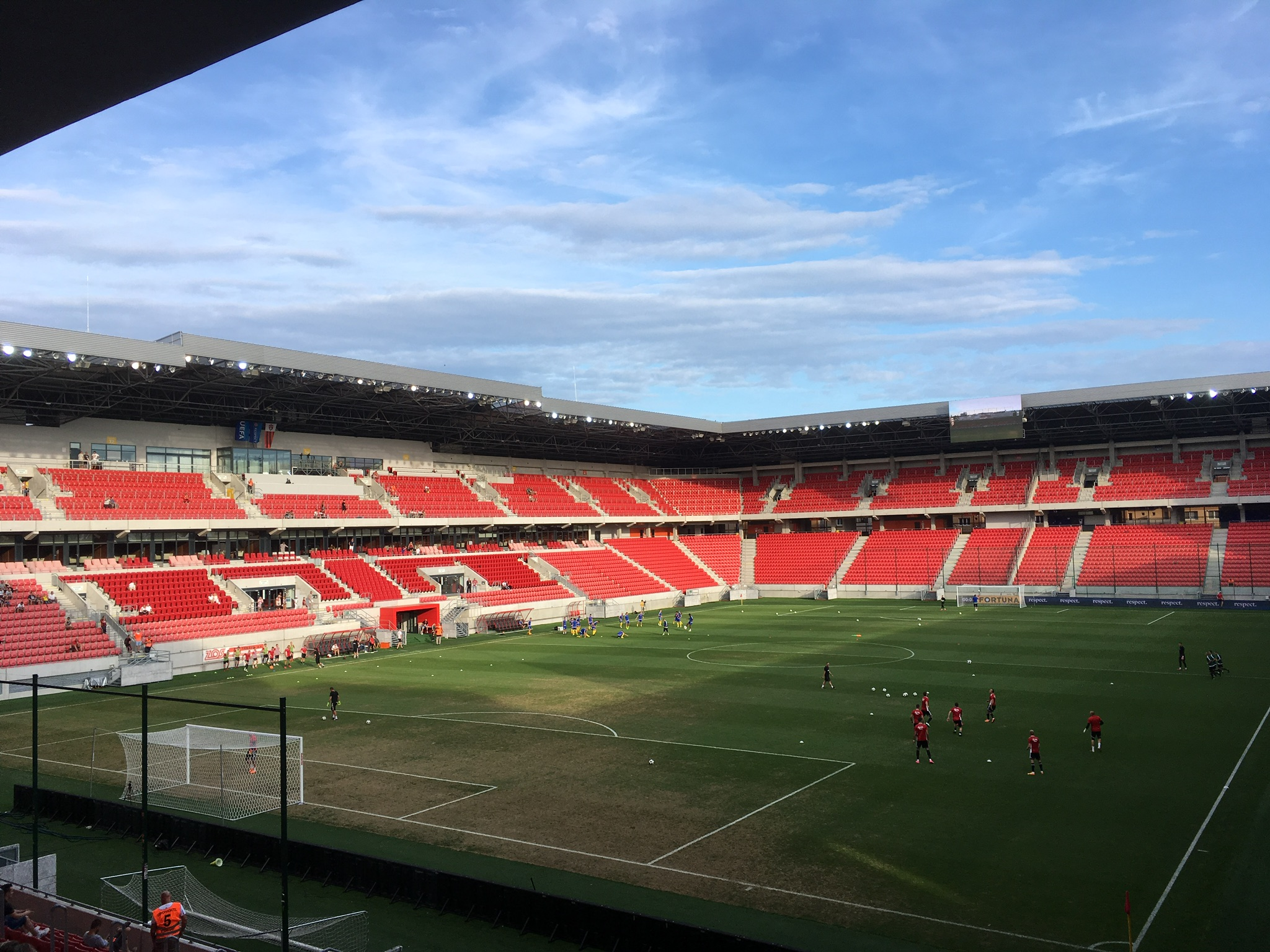
- UEFA
- Interactive map of City Arena – Anton Malatinský Stadium
- Address: Športová 1
- Location: Trnava, Slovakia
- Coordinates: 48°22′24″N 17°35′30″E
- Owner: City of Trnava
- Operator: City-Arena a.s.
- Capacity: 19,200
- Executive suites: 20
- Surface: Hybrid grass
- Record attendance: 28,116 v Újpest; 6 March 1974 (European Cup)
- Field size: 105 × 68 m

Construction
- Opened: 22 August 2015
- Renovated: 2013–2015
- Cost: €79 million
- Architect: Pavol Adamec

Tenants
- Spartak Trnava (1923–present); Slovakia national football team (1996–present); Sereď (2021–2022); UEFA U-21 Championship (2025)

Website
- Official: http://stadium.cityarena.tt Fansite: http://www.CityArenaTrnava.com

Anton Malatinský Stadium (Slovak: Štadión Antona Malatinského) is a football stadium located in Trnava, Slovakia, which is the home ground of the local football club Spartak Trnava. The stadium was completely renovated in 2013–2015 and has an all-seated capacity of 18,200 which makes it the second-largest football stadium in Slovakia.

On 14 January 1998, the stadium was named in honour of former footballer and manager Anton Malatinský, who died in 1992.

== 2013–2015 reconstruction ==
The stadium underwent a complex reconstruction between 2013 and 2015. The project consisted not only of a complete reconstruction of the stadium, but the construction of an adjacent shopping centre named City Arena. The whole construction cost of the project was €79 million, of which €28 million was the cost of stadium reconstruction. The Slovak government provided €13 million of the cost.

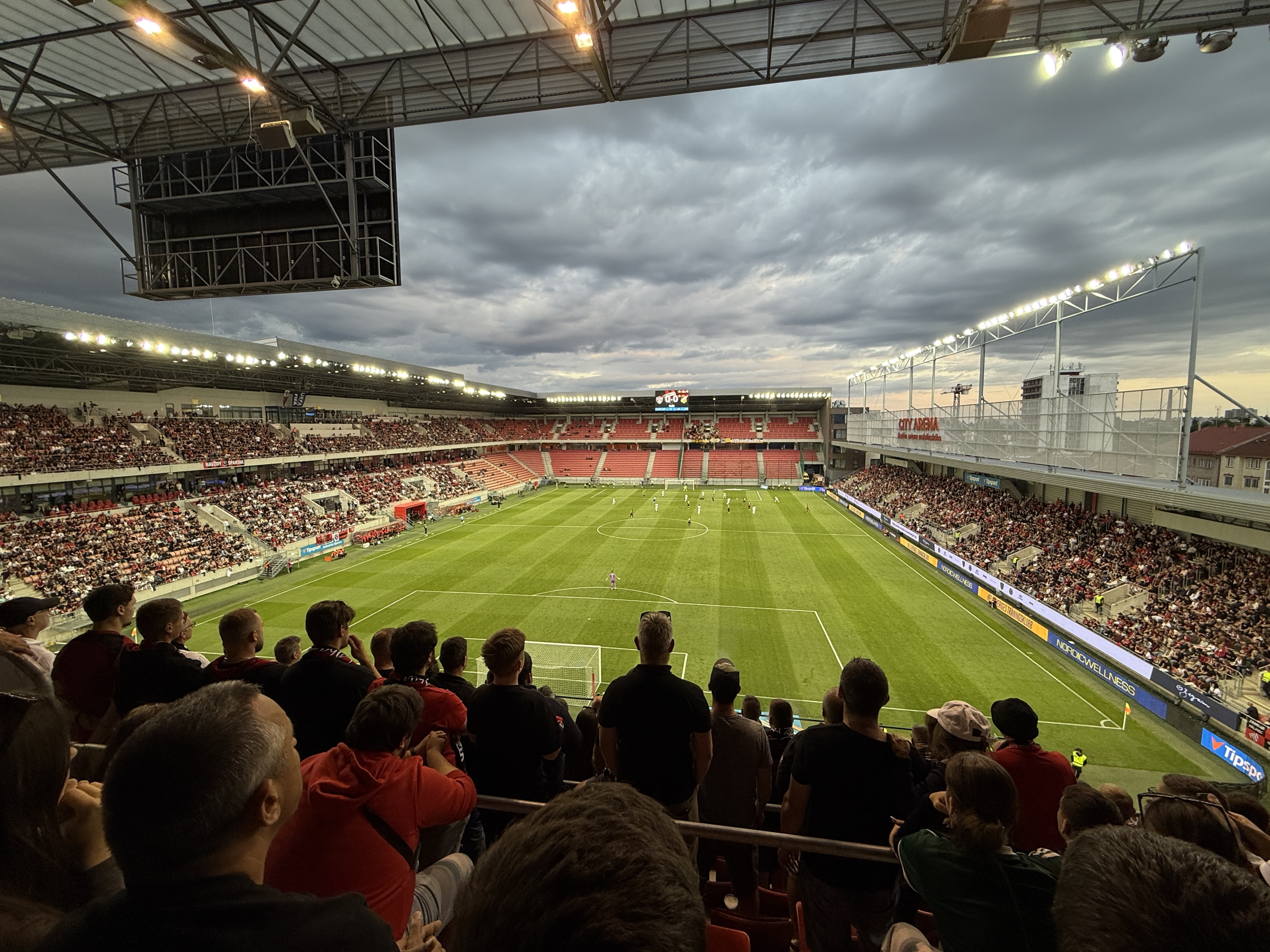
Spartak Trnava vs Häcken.

Spartak Trnava officially announced their intention to develop the stadium on 25 November 2011, after that preparation works began immediately. Three out of four stands (including the old floodlights) were completely demolished between April and August 2013. A construction permit was granted in August 2013 and cornerstone of the stadium was placed in September 2013. Spartak Trnava continued playing at the stadium during the reconstruction, with only West Stand in service. In May 2015, the last of the four stands was demolished and subsequently rebuilt.

The opening ceremony of the new stadium took place on 22 August 2015. In the opening match, Spartak Trnava lost to Brazilian club Atlético Paranaense 0–2.

== Milestone matches (after reconstruction) ==
Match	Home	Result	Opponent	Date	Competition	Attendance
First match	(Slovakia) Spartak Trnava	0–2	(Brazil) Atlético Paranaense	22 August 2015	Friendly match	16,500
First Slovak League match	(Slovakia) Spartak Trnava	2–0	(Slovakia) MŠK Žilina	30 August 2015	2015–16	13,340
First international match	Slovakia	3–2	Switzerland	13 November 2015	Friendly match	17,582
First Slovak Cup match	(Slovakia) Slovan Bratislava	1–3	(Slovakia) Trenčín	29 April 2016	Final 2015–16	8,574
First Europa League match	(Slovakia) Spartak Trnava	3–0	(Malta) Hibernians F.C.	30 June 2016	2016–17	0
First Champions League match	(Slovakia) Spartak Trnava	1–0	(Bosnia and Herzegovina) Zrinjski Mostar	11 July 2018	2018–19	0

== International matches ==
Anton Malatinský Stadium has hosted 36 matches of the Slovakia national team (14 friendlies and 22 competitive games).

On June 19, 2023, the stadium served as home ground for the Ukrainian national football team on their game against Malta since Ukraine were unable to play in their country due to the Russian invasion of Ukraine.

27 April 1988 International Friendly	Czechoslovakia	1–1	Soviet Union	Trnava, Slovakia
	Lubomír Vlk 62'		Oleh Protasov 82'	Stadium: Štadión Antona Malatinského; Attendance: 22,036; Referee: Hubert Forstinger

24 April 1996 International Friendly	Slovakia	0–0	Bulgaria	Trnava, Slovakia
Match 19				Stadium: Štadión Antona Malatinského; Attendance: 11,000; Referee: István Vad (Hungary)

19 April 1997 International Friendly	Slovakia	3–1	Iceland	Trnava, Slovakia
Match 30	Július Šimon 36' (pen.), 85' (pen.); Jaroslav Timko 54'; Vladimír Kinder (red card) 57'		Helgi Sigurðsson 26'	Stadium: Štadión Antona Malatinského; Attendance: 3,403; Referee: Igor Yarmenchuk

28 March 2001 2002 FIFA World Cup; Qualifying Group 4	Slovakia	3–1	Azerbaijan	Trnava, Slovakia
17:00; Match 81	Szilárd Németh 1', 10'; Ľubomír Meszároš 57'		Vadim Vasilyev 3' (pen.); Emin Agaev (yellow card) 53' (yellow-red card) 78'	Stadium: Štadión Antona Malatinského; Attendance: 10,000; Referee: Costas Kapitanis (Cyprus)

20 November 2002 International Friendly	Slovakia	1–1	Ukraine	Trnava, Slovakia
Match 98	Miroslav Karhan 64' (pen.)		Oleksandr Melashchenko 84'	Stadium: Štadión Antona Malatinského; Attendance: 2,859; Referee: Zbigniew Marczyk (Poland)

2 April 2003 2004 UEFA Euro; Qualifying Group 7	Slovakia	4–0	Liechtenstein	Trnava, Slovakia
19:00; Match 102	Ľubomír Reiter 19'; Szilárd Németh 50', 64'; Vladimír Janočko 89'			Stadium: Štadión Antona Malatinského; Attendance: Closed Doors; Referee: Darko Ceferin (Slovenia)

17 November 2004 International Friendly	Slovakia	0–0	Slovenia	Trnava, Slovakia
Match 118				Stadium: Štadión Antona Malatinského; Attendance: 5,482; Referee: Tommy Skjerven (Norway)

20 May 2006 International Friendly	Slovakia	1–1	Belgium	Trnava, Slovakia
20:00; Match 134	Filip Hološko 65'		Karel Geraerts 77'	Stadium: Štadión Antona Malatinského; Attendance: 3,000; Referee: Viktor Kassai (Hungary)

22 August 2007 International Friendly	Slovakia	0–1	France	Trnava, Slovakia
21:00; Match 146			Thierry Henry 38'	Stadium: Štadión Antona Malatinského; Attendance: 13,164; Referee: Igor Egorov (Russia)

12 September 2007 2008 UEFA Euro; Qualifying Group D	Slovakia	2–5	Wales	Trnava, Slovakia
18:30; Match 148	Marek Mintál 12', 57'		Freddy Eastwood 22'; Craig Bellamy 34', 41'; Ján Ďurica 78' (o.g.); Simon Davies 90'	Stadium: Štadión Antona Malatinského; Attendance: 5,486; Referee: Laurent Duhamel (France)

29 March 2011 International Friendly	Slovakia	1–2	Denmark	Trnava, Slovakia
20:15; Match 190	Filip Hološko 32'		Kornel Saláta 3' (o.g.); Michael Krohn-Dehli 72'	Stadium: Štadión Antona Malatinského; Attendance: 4,927; Referee: David Fernández (Spain)

13 November 2015 International Friendly	Slovakia	3–2	Switzerland	Trnava, Slovakia
20:45; Match 233	Michal Ďuriš 39', 48'; Róbert Mak 55'		Eren Derdiyok 63'; Josip Drmić 67'	Stadium: Štadión Antona Malatinského; Attendance: 17,582; Referee: Miroslav Zelinka (Czech Republic)

25 March 2016 International Friendly	Slovakia	0–0	Latvia	Trnava, Slovakia
20:30; Match 235				Stadium: Štadión Antona Malatinského; Attendance: 12,405; Referee: Harald Lechner (Austria)

4 June 2016 International Friendly	Slovakia	0–0	Northern Ireland	Trnava, Slovakia
20:45; Match 239				Stadium: Štadión Antona Malatinského; Attendance: 18,111; Referee: Radu Petrescu (Romania)

4 September 2016 2018 FIFA World Cup; Qualifying Group F	Slovakia	0–1	England	Trnava, Slovakia
18:00; Match 244			Lallana 90+5'	Stadium: Štadión Antona Malatinského; Attendance: 18,111; Referee: Milorad Mažić (Serbia)

11 October 2016 2018 FIFA World Cup; Qualifying Group F	Slovakia	3–0	Scotland	Trnava, Slovakia
20:45; Match 246	Róbert Mak 18', 56'; Adam Nemec 68'			Stadium: Štadión Antona Malatinského; Attendance: 11,097; Referee: Martin Strömbergsson (Sweden)

11 November 2016 2018 FIFA World Cup; Qualifying Group F	Slovakia	4–0	Lithuania	Trnava, Slovakia
20:45; Match 247	Adam Nemec 12'; Juraj Kucka 15'; Martin Škrtel 36'; Marek Hamšík 86'			Stadium: Štadión Antona Malatinského; Attendance: 9,653; Referee: Tasos Sidiropoulos (Greece)

1 September 2017 2018 FIFA World Cup; Qualifying Group F	Slovakia	1–0	Slovenia	Trnava, Slovakia
20:45 (20:45 UTC+2)	Nemec 81'	Report (FIFA); Report (UEFA)		Stadium: Štadión Antona Malatinského; Attendance: 16,896; Referee: Antonio Mateu Lahoz (Spain)

8 October 2017 2018 FIFA World Cup; Qualifying Group F	Slovakia	3–0	Malta	Trnava, Slovakia
18:00	Adam Nemec 33', 62'; Ondrej Duda 69'			Stadium: Štadión Antona Malatinského; Attendance: 17,774; Referee: Paolo Mazzoleni (Italy)

14 November 2017 International Friendly	Slovakia	1–0	Norway	Trnava, Slovakia
18:00	Stanislav Lobotka 90+3'	Report		Stadium: Štadión Antona Malatinského; Attendance: 6,415; Referee: Ádám Farkas (Hungary)

31 May 2018 International Friendly	Slovakia	1–1	Netherlands	Trnava, Slovakia
20:45	Adam Nemec 8'	Report	Quincy Promes 59'	Stadium: Štadión Antona Malatinského; Attendance: 15,432; Referee: Bartosz Frankowski, Poland

5 September 2018 International Friendly	Slovakia	3–0	Denmark	Trnava, Slovakia
20:45	Nemec 11'; Rusnák 37'; Fogt 79' (o.g.)	Report		Stadium: Štadión Antona Malatinského; Attendance: 6,432; Referee: Julian Weinberger (Austria)

13 October 2018 2018–19 UEFA Nations League	Slovakia	1–2	Czech Republic	Trnava, Slovakia
15:00	Hamšík 62'	Report	Krmenčík 52'; Schick 76'	Stadium: Štadión Antona Malatinského; Attendance: 17,251; Referee: Slavko Vinčić (Slovenia)

16 November 2018 2018–19 UEFA Nations League	Slovakia	4–1	Ukraine	Trnava, Slovakia
20:45	Rusnák 6'; Kucka 26'; Zreľák 52'; Mak 61'	Report	Konoplyanka 47'	Stadium: Štadión Antona Malatinského; Attendance: 9,764; Referee: Nikola Dabanović (Montenegro)

21 March 2019 UEFA Euro 2020 qualifying	Slovakia	2–0	Hungary	Trnava, Slovakia
20:45	Ondrej Duda 42'; Albert Rusnák 85'	Report		Stadium: Štadión Antona Malatinského; Attendance: 14,235; Referee: Vladislav Bezborodov

7 June 2019 International Friendly	Slovakia	5–1	Jordan	Trnava, Slovakia
20:30	Lukáš Haraslín 50'; Martin Chrien 55'; Ján Greguš 71' (pen.); Samuel Mráz 74'; Jaroslav Mihalík 84'	Report	Musa Al-Taamari 39'	Stadium: Štadión Antona Malatinského; Attendance: 3,454; Referee: Tomasz Musial (Poland)

6 September 2019 UEFA Euro 2020 qualifying	Slovakia	0–4	Croatia	Trnava, Slovakia
20:45		Report	Nikola Vlašić 45'; Ivan Perišić 47'; Bruno Petković 72'; Dejan Lovren 89'	Stadium: Štadión Antona Malatinského; Attendance: 18,098; Referee: Felix Brych (Germany)

10 October 2019 UEFA Euro 2020 qualifying	Slovakia	1–1	Wales	Trnava, Slovakia
20:45	Juraj Kucka 53'	Report	Kieffer Moore 25'	Stadium: Štadión Antona Malatinského; Attendance: 18,071; Referee: Carlos del Cerro Grande (Spain)

19 November 2019 UEFA Euro 2020 qualifying	Slovakia	2–0	Azerbaijan	Trnava, Slovakia
20:45	Róbert Boženík 19'; Marek Hamšík 86'	Report		Stadium: Štadión Antona Malatinského; Attendance: 7,825; Referee: Serhiy Boyko (Ukraine)

14 October 2020 2020–21 UEFA Nations League B	Slovakia	2–3	Israel	Trnava, Slovakia
20:45	Marek Hamšík 16'; Róbert Mak 38'	Report	68', 76', 89' Eran Zahavi	Stadium: Štadión Antona Malatinského; Attendance: 0 Referee: Alejandro Hernández Hernández (Spain)

15 November 2020 2020–21 UEFA Nations League B	Slovakia	1–0	Scotland	Trnava, Slovakia
15:00	Ján Greguš 31'	Report		Stadium: Štadión Antona Malatinského; Attendance: 0 Referee: István Kovács (Romania)

27 March 2021 2022 FIFA World Cup qualification	Slovakia	2–2	Malta	Trnava, Slovakia
20:45	David Strelec 49'; Milan Škriniar 53'	Report	17' Luke Gambin; 20' Alexander Satariano	Stadium: Štadión Antona Malatinského; Attendance: 0 Referee: Harald Lechner (Austria)

30 March 2021 2022 FIFA World Cup qualification	Slovakia	2–1	Russia	Trnava, Slovakia
20:45	Milan Škriniar 38'; Róbert Mak 74'	Report	Mário Fernandes 71'	Stadium: Štadión Antona Malatinského; Attendance: 0 Referee: Carlos del Cerro Grande (Spain)

11 November 2021 2022 FIFA World Cup qualification	Slovakia	2–2	Slovenia	Trnava, Slovakia
20:45	Ondrej Duda 58' (pen.); David Strelec 74'	Report	18' Miha Zajc; 62' Miha Mevlja	Stadium: Štadión Antona Malatinského; Attendance: 2,726; Referee: Mattias Gestranius (Finland)

6 June 2022 2022–23 UEFA Nations League C	Slovakia	0–1	Kazakhstan	Trnava, Slovakia
20:45		Report	Darabayev 26'	Stadium: Štadión Antona Malatinského; Attendance: 4,146; Referee: Kristo Tohver (Estonia)

22 September 2022 2022–23 UEFA Nations League C	Slovakia	1–2	Azerbaijan	Trnava, Slovakia
20:45	Jirka 90+3' (pen.)	Report	Dadashov 44'; Haghverdi 90+5'	Stadium: Štadión Antona Malatinského; Attendance: 2,875; Referee: Willie Collum (Scotland)

23 March 2023 UEFA Euro 2024 qualification	Slovakia	0–0	Luxembourg	Trnava, Slovakia
20:45		Report		Stadium: Štadión Antona Malatinského; Attendance: 3,523; Referee: Rade Obrenovič (Slovenia)

19 June 2023 UEFA Euro 2024 qualifying	Ukraine	1–0	Malta	Trnava, Slovakia
11:00	Tsygankov 72' (pen.)	Report		Stadium: Štadión Antona Malatinského; Referee: Ruddy Buquet (France)

9 June 2024 International Friendly	Slovakia	4–0	Wales	Trnava, Slovakia
20:45	Juraj Kucka 45' Róbert Boženík 56' Ethan Ampadu 60' (o.g.) László Bénes 90'	Report		Stadium: Štadión Antona Malatinského; Attendance: 6348; Referee: Daniel Stefański (Poland)

13 October 2025 2026 FIFA World Cup qualification	Slovakia	2–0	Luxembourg	Trnava, Slovakia
20:45	Adam Obert 55' Ivan Schranz 72'	Report		Stadium: Štadión Antona Malatinského; Attendance: 13 010; Referee: Rade Obrenovič

02 October 2026 2026-27 UEFA Nations League	Ukraine	0 - 3	Northern Ireland	Trnava, Slovakia
20:45		Report	Brown 9' Price 61' Brown 61'	Stadium: Štadión Antona Malatinského; Attendance: 7,800; Referee: Horacio Elizondo (Belgium)

05 October 2026 2026-27 UEFA Nations League	Ukraine	1 - 2	Hungary	Trnava, Slovakia
20:45	Yaremchuk 83'	Report	Tóth 52' Csinger 85'	Stadium: Štadión Antona Malatinského; Attendance: 7,910; Referee: Igor Pajač

17 November 2026	Ukraine	TBA	Georgia	Trnava, Slovakia
20:45		Report		Stadium: Štadión Antona Malatinského

== Image gallery ==
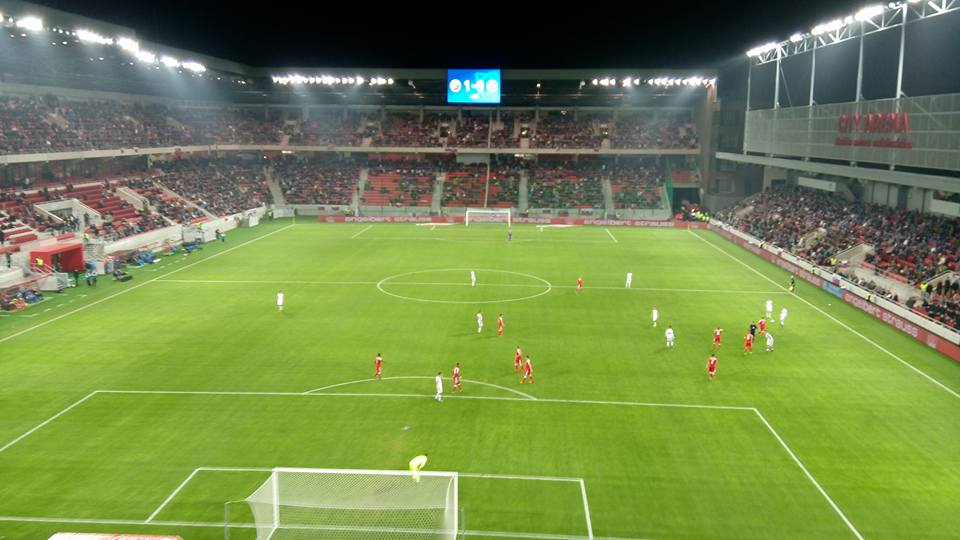
Anton Malatinský Stadium in 2015

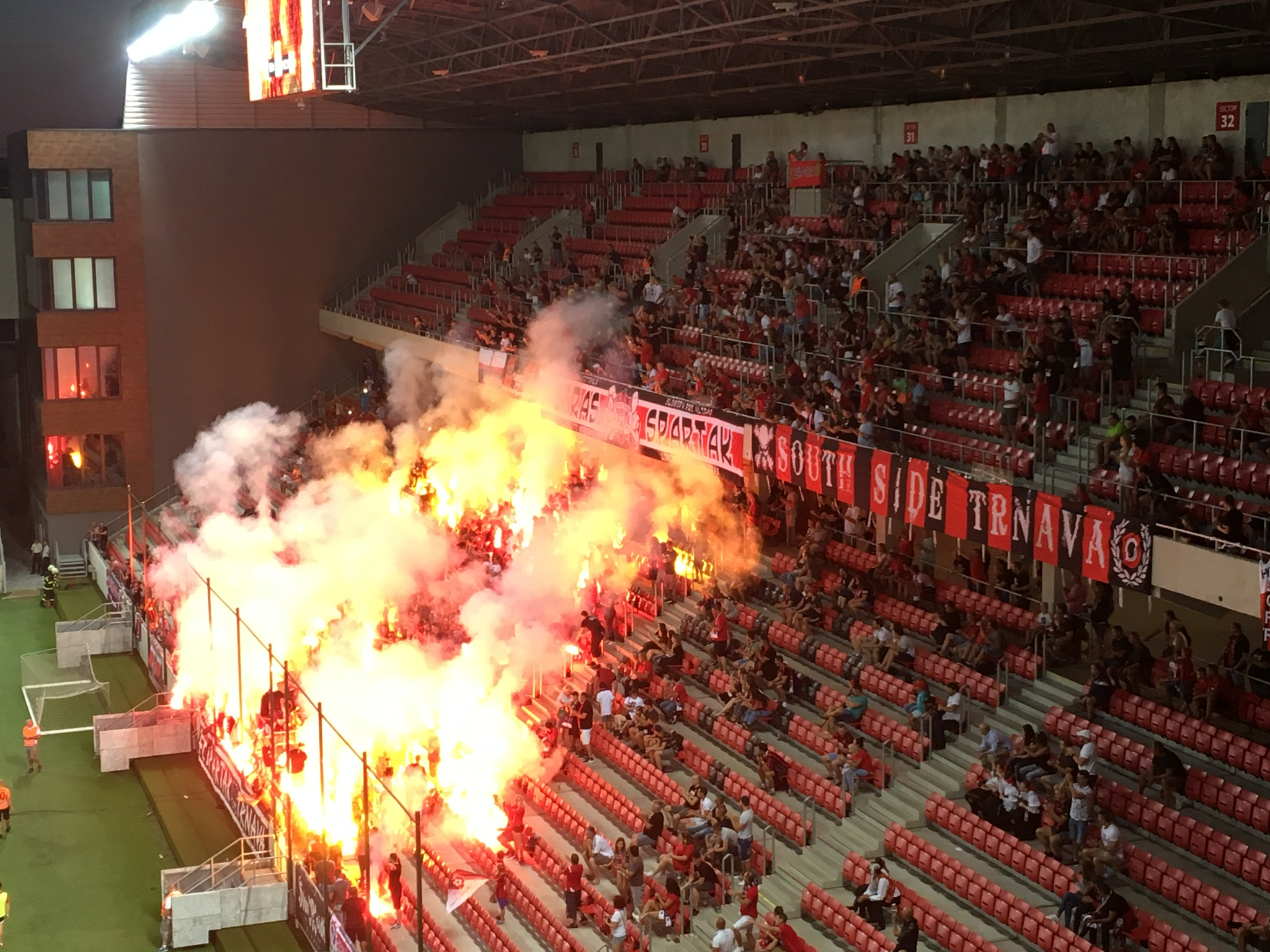
Spartak Trnava ultras at the stadium in 2018

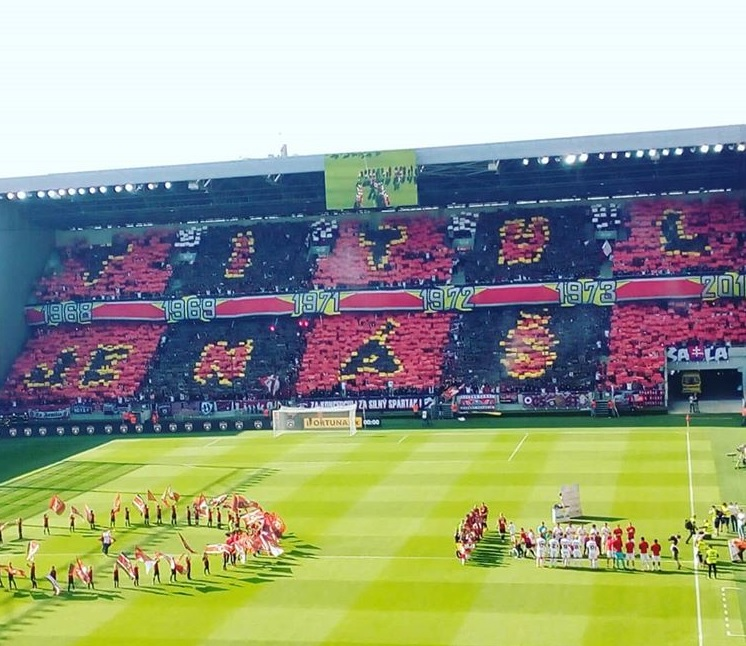
Spartak fans in match against AS Trenčín in 2018
