= Jean Paul Farrugia =

Maltese footballer

Personal information
- Full name: Jean Paul Farrugia
- Date of birth: 21 March 1992 (age 34)
- Place of birth: Pietà, Malta
- Height: 1.82 m (6 ft 0 in)
- Position: Forward

Team information
- Current team: Mosta (loan)
- Number: 23

Senior career*
Years	Team	Apps	(Gls)
2008–2016	Hibernians	78	(19)
2011–2012	→ Marsaxlokk (loan)	26	(6)
2014	→ Spartak Trnava (loan)	2	(0)
2016–2017	Sliema Wanderers	46	(17)
2017–2018	Chiasso	13	(6)
2018–	Sliema Wanderers	49	(17)
2022–2023	→ Birkirkara (loan)	12	(0)
2023–	→ Mosta (loan)	13	(1)

International career^{‡}
2014–	Malta	16	(1)
- * Club domestic league appearances and goals as of 13 May 2024 ‡ National team caps and goals as of 6 October 2019

Jean Paul Farrugia (born 21 March 1992) is a Maltese professional footballer who currently plays for Mosta, on loan from Sliema Wanderers.

== International career ==
Farrugia played his first international game with the senior national team on 4 June 2014 in and against Gibraltar (1–0), after he came on as a substitute for André Schembri in the 74th minute of that game. He scored his first goal on March 26, 2017 against Slovakia.

=== International goals ===
Scores and results list Malta's goal tally first.

No	Date	Venue	Opponent	Score	Result	Competition
1.	26 March 2017	Ta' Qali National Stadium, Mdina, Malta	Slovakia	1–1	1–3	2018 FIFA World Cup qualification

== Honours ==
Hibernians

- Maltese League: 2008–09, 2014–15
- Maltese FA Trophy: 2012–13

Sliema Wanderers

- Maltese FA Trophy: 2015–16

Birkirkara

- Maltese FA Trophy: 2022–23
