= Tom McCready (footballer, born 1943) =

Scottish footballer

Personal information
- Date of birth: 19 October 1943
- Place of birth: Johnstone, Scotland
- Date of death: 19 July 2016 (aged 72)
- Position: Left back

Senior career*
Years	Team	Apps	(Gls)
1962–1963	Hibernian	0	(0)
1963–1964	Watford	1	(0)
1965–1974	Wimbledon	355	(21)
1974–1975	Dulwich Hamlet	?	(?)
1975–1976	Staines Town	?	(?)
- * Club domestic league appearances and goals

Thomas McCready (19 October 1943 – 19 July 2016) was a Scottish professional footballer who played in the Football League as a left back. He joined Wimbledon from Watford (for whom he made just one appearance). He played over 400 matches for the Dons, scoring 25 goals. McCready left at the end of the 1973/74 season and retired after short spells at Dulwich Hamlet and Staines Town.

McCready was one of many former Wimbledon players who supported the phoenix club AFC Wimbledon, and regularly attended matches. In July 2016 he died after an illness.
