= Deaths in July 2016 =

The following is a list of notable deaths in July 2016.

Entries for each day are listed alphabetically by surname. A typical entry lists information in the following sequence:

- Name, age, country of citizenship and reason for notability, established cause of death, reference.

== July 2016 ==
=== 1 ===
- Yves Bonnefoy, 93, French poet.
- Tom Boulton, 90, English anaesthetist.
- Ramchandra Chintaman Dhere, 85, Indian writer.
- Mollie Evans, 94, British antique dealer.
- Robin Hardy, 86, British film director (The Wicker Man).
- Sir Malcolm Macnaughton, 91, Scottish obstetrician and gynaecologist.
- Werner Meng, 68, German jurist, cancer.
- Mary Mostert, 87, American author.
- Jimmy Arthur Ordge, 80, Canadian country singer.
- Jerzy Patoła, 70, Polish footballer.
- Imogen Skirving, 78, British hotelier, traffic collision.
- Frank Tuck, 84, Australian football player (Collingwood).

=== 2 ===
- Caroline Aherne, 52, English comedian, actress and writer (The Royle Family, The Mrs Merton Show, The Fast Show), throat cancer.
- Roscoe C. Brown Jr., 94, American World War II veteran, member of the Tuskegee Airmen.
- Kyle Calloway, 29, American football player (Buffalo Bills), struck by train.
- Chen Jinhua, 87, Chinese politician, Chairman of the State Planning Commission (1993–1998).
- Cherokee Run, 26, American thoroughbred racehorse and sire, euthanised.
- Maciej Szymon Cieśla, 27, Polish graphic designer, cancer.
- Michael Cimino, 77, American screenwriter and director (The Deer Hunter, Thunderbolt and Lightfoot, Heaven's Gate).
- Robert Daley, American moviemaker.
- Roger Dumas, 84, French comedian and actor (That Man from Rio, Le Concert, The First Day of the Rest of Your Life).
- Horacio Etchegoyen, 97, Argentine psychoanalyst.
- Elyse Grinstein, 87, American architect.
- Rudolf E. Kálmán, 86, Hungarian-born American electrical engineer (Kalman filter).
- Clementia Killewald, 62, German Benedictine nun.
- Euan Lloyd, 92, British film producer (The Wild Geese, The Sea Wolves).
- Patrick Manning, 69, Trinidadian politician, Prime Minister (1991–1995, 2001–2010), acute myeloid leukemia.
- Mary McClure, 77, American politician, small-cell carcinoma.
- Alphie McCourt, 75, Irish-American writer.
- Bob McCoy, 81, American basketball player and coach.
- Carlos Morocho Hernández, 76, Venezuelan WBA and WBC super lightweight champion boxer (1965–1966).
- Lalit Mohan Nath, 80, Bangladeshi nuclear physicist.
- Harold "H" Nelson, 88, British cycling coach.
- Robert Nye, 77, British poet.
- Willard Pummel, 89, American politician.
- Michel Rocard, 85, French politician, Prime Minister (1988–1991).
- Flavio Romero de Velasco, 90, Mexican lawyer and politician, Governor of Jalisco (1977–1983).
- Irineu Roque Scherer, 65, Brazilian Roman Catholic prelate, Bishop of Garanhuns (1998–2007) and Joinville (since 2007).
- Kapil Seth, 36, Indian cricketer, liver failure.
- Jack C. Taylor, 94, American billionaire businessman, founder of Enterprise Rent-A-Car.
- Clifford Vaughs, 79, American civil rights activist, filmmaker and motorcycle builder (Easy Rider).
- Wilfred D. Webb, 95, American politician.
- Elie Wiesel, 87, Romanian-born American writer (Night), political activist and Holocaust survivor, Nobel Laureate (1986).

=== 3 ===
- Arturo, 31, American-born Argentine polar bear.
- Michael Beaumont, 22nd Seigneur of Sark, 88, British aristocrat, Seigneur of Sark (since 1974).
- João José Bracony, 97, Brazilian Olympic sailor (1948).
- Gilbert Bulawan, 29, Filipino basketball player (Blackwater Elite), heart attack.
- Lou Fontinato, 84, Canadian ice hockey player (New York Rangers, Montreal Canadiens).
- Jimmy Frizzell, 79, Scottish football player and manager.
- Richard Grayson, 75, American composer and pianist.
- Tomohiko Kira, 56, Japanese guitarist and composer.
- John Middleton, 59, British footballer (Derby County, Nottingham Forest).
- Uma Shankar Mishra, 93, Indian politician.
- Noel Neill, 95, American actress (Superman).
- Tom Van Sickle, 79, American politician.
- Mauricio Walerstein, 71, Mexican film director (Cuando quiero llorar no lloro, Españolas en París).
- Markus Werner, 71, Swiss writer (Zündels Abgang).
- Grant Wilmot, 59, Australian football player, heart attack.

=== 4 ===
- Romesh Chandra, 97, Indian activist and news editor (Communist Party of India), President of the World Peace Council (1977–1990).
- William Hawkins, 76, Canadian musician and poet.
- Abbas Kiarostami, 76, Iranian film director and screenwriter (Close-Up, Taste of Cherry, Certified Copy), gastrointestinal cancer.
- Ben Koufie, 84, Ghanaian football player, manager and administrator.
- Abner Mikva, 90, American politician and judge, member of the United States House of Representatives from Illinois's 2nd and 10th congressional districts (1969–1973, 1975–1979), U.S. Court of Appeals for the D.C. Circuit (1979–1994), complications from bladder cancer.
- Terence O'Brien, 79, Australian botanist.
- Rondon Pacheco, 96, Brazilian politician, Governor of Minas Gerais (1971–1975), pneumonia.
- Geoffrey Shovelton, 80, English opera singer and illustrator.
- Elizabeth Spillius, 92, Canadian psychoanalyst.
- Steve Tupper, 75, Canadian Olympic sailor (1968).

=== 5 ===
- Sayed Hussein Anwari, 60, Afghan politician, MP (since 2005), Governor of Herat Province (2005–2009), cancer.
- William L. Armstrong, 79, American politician, United States Senator (1979–1991) and member of the United States House of Representatives from Colorado's 5th congressional district (1973–1979), cancer.
- Hamp Atkinson, 82, American politician, member of the Texas House of Representatives (1975–1983).
- Rosaria Conte, 64, Italian social scientist.
- Nine Culliford, 86, Belgian cartoonist (The Smurfs).
- Beatrice de Cardi, 102, British archaeologist, complications from a fall.
- Alirio Díaz, 92, Venezuelan classical guitarist and composer.
- Ronald Finley, 75, American Olympic wrestler.
- Mick Finucane, 93, Irish Gaelic football player (Kerry).
- John Baillie-Hamilton, 13th Earl of Haddington, 74, British aristocrat.
- Doug Hargreaves, 84, Canadian football coach.
- Kari Hautala, 43, Finnish basketball player (Torpan Pojat), heart attack.
- David Jones, 66, British politician, member of the States of Guernsey (since 2000), cancer.
- Raymond Lombard, 97, Belgian Olympian.
- John Madey, 72, American physicist.
- Zdeněk Neubauer, 74, Czech philosopher and biologist.
- Gladys Nordenstrom, 92, American composer.
- Phonsie O'Brien, 86, Irish jockey and racehorse trainer.
- Rex Pickering, 79, New Zealand rugby union player (Waikato, national team).
- Cory Taylor, 61, Australian writer, melanoma and brain cancer.
- Brian White, 59, British politician, MP (1997–2005), oesophageal cancer.
- Victor P. Whittaker, 97, British biochemist.
- Valentino Zeichen, 78, Italian poet and author.

=== 6 ===
- Bukky Ajayi, 82, Nigerian actress (Mother of George).
- Marian Bergeson, 90, American politician, member of the California Senate (1984–1995).
- Larry Bock, 56, American investor, cancer.
- Michel Coloni, 88, French Roman Catholic prelate, Archbishop of Dijon (1989–2004).
- Matthew Evans, Baron Evans of Temple Guiting, 74, British publisher (Faber).
- Armando León Bejarano, 100, Mexican politician, Governor of Morelos (1976–1982).
- Norman MacAuley, 98, Canadian politician.
- Shaw McCutcheon, 94, American editorial cartoonist.
- John McMartin, 86, American actor (Sweet Charity, Kinsey, Law & Order), cancer.
- Duma Mdutyana, 55, South African army officer.
- Mike Moore, 59, American football player (Middle Tennessee State Blue Raiders, Houston Oilers).
- Turgay Şeren, 84, Turkish footballer (Galatasaray).
- Umaru Shinkafi, 79, Nigerian politician and intelligence chief.
- Danny Smythe, 67, American drummer (The Box Tops).

=== 7 ===
- Bob Argo, 92, American politician.
- Sally Beauman, 71, British writer (Rebecca's Tale, The Landscape of Love), pneumonia.
- Bruno Bonaldi, 71, Italian ski mountaineer, world champion (1975).
- Rokusuke Ei, 83, Japanese author and lyricist ("Sukiyaki").
- Larry Fortensky, 64, American construction worker, complications from skin cancer surgery.
- James Gilbert, 93, Scottish television producer (The Two Ronnies, Last of the Summer Wine).
- Leonard Lee, 77, Canadian businessman (Lee Valley Tools), complications from vascular dementia.
- Cinna Lomnitz, 90, German-born Chilean-Mexican geophysicist.
- Tom Marr, 73, American radio host (WCBM), complications from a stroke.
- Miisa, 46, Finnish Eurodance artist, cancer.
- John O'Rourke, 71, English footballer (Middlesbrough, Ipswich Town), cancer.
- Paddy Phelan, 78, English cricketer (Essex).
- Anita Reeves, 68, Irish actress (Dancing at Lughnasa, Little Gem), cancer.
- Wolfram Siebeck, 87, German journalist and food critic.
- Gaurav Tiwari, 31, Indian actor and paranormal investigator, asphyxiation.
- Bill Williams, 90, Australian football player.

=== 8 ===
- Javed Akhtar, 75, Pakistani cricketer and umpire.
- John Broujos, 87, American politician.
- Sulaiman Damit, 75, Bruneian army general.
- Frank Dickens, 84, British cartoonist (Bristow).
- Abdul Sattar Edhi, 88, Pakistani philanthropist, social activist, ascetic and humanitarian, founder of the Edhi Foundation.
- Vittorio Goretti, 77, Italian astronomer.
- Hal Hudson, 89, American baseball player (St. Louis Browns, Chicago White Sox).
- Gurli Vibe Jensen, 91, Danish missionary, priest and writer.
- Harold A. Linstone, 92, German-born American mathematician and futurist.
- Turk Lown, 92, American baseball player (Chicago Cubs, Chicago White Sox, Cincinnati Reds), leukemia.
- William Lucas, 91, British actor (The Adventures of Black Beauty).
- Cicely Mayhew, 92, British diplomat.
- Jackie McInally, 76, Scottish footballer (Kilmarnock, Motherwell, Hamilton Academical).
- William H. McNeill, 98, Canadian-American historian and author.
- Robert De Middeleir, 77, Belgian cyclist.
- Shettima Ali Monguno, 90, Nigerian politician.
- Katsuhiro Nakagawa, 74, Japanese executive, vice chairman of Toyota (2001–2009).
- Jeffrey Nape, 51–52, Papua New Guinean politician, acting Governor-General (2004, 2010), organ failure.
- Steve Owens, 59, Canadian politician, Ontario MPP (1990–1995).
- Howard Raiffa, 92, American academic.
- Jacques Rouffio, 87, French film director and screenwriter.
- Gerald Sherratt, 84, American university administrator, President of Southern Utah University (1982–1997).
- Vladimir Troyepolsky, 61, Russian television executive.
- Burhan Wani, 22, Indian Kashmiri militant, shot.
- William Wondriska, 85, American illustrator and writer, complications from Parkinson's disease.
- Yuzhan, 92, Chinese calligrapher and imperial prince, Prince Gong (1936–1945).

=== 9 ===
- Norman Abbott, 93, American television director (Leave It to Beaver, Welcome Back, Kotter, The Jack Benny Program).
- Ron Allbright, 81, Canadian football player (Calgary Stampeders).
- Johnny Barnes, 93, Bermudian entertainer.
- Víctor Barrio, 29, Spanish matador, gored.
- Lothar Dräger, 89, German comic writer.
- Hasan Basri Durin, 81, Indonesian politician, Minister of Agrarian Affairs (1998–1999), Governor of West Sumatra (1987–1997), Mayor of Padang (1971–1983).
- Erny Brenner, 84, Luxembourgish footballer.
- Judy Canty, 84, Australian Olympic long jumper (1948).
- Geneviève Castrée, 35, Canadian musician and comic book artist, pancreatic cancer.
- Mary Fritz, 78, American politician, member of the Connecticut House of Representatives (1983–1985, 1987–2016).
- Bill Guilfoile, 84, American public relations executive (Baseball Hall of Fame, New York Yankees, Pittsburgh Pirates).
- Vaughn Harper, 71, American radio DJ.
- Kalle Havulinna, 91, Finnish ice hockey player (Ilves).
- Frank Johnson, 84, Australian footballer (Port Melbourne, South Melbourne).
- Hugo Niebeling, 85, German filmmaker (Alvorada).
- Maralin Niska, 89, American soprano.
- Clyde Parris, 93, Panamanian baseball player (New York Black Yankees, Baltimore Elite Giants), complications from liver cancer.
- Silvano Piovanelli, 92, Italian Roman Catholic cardinal, Archbishop of Florence (1983–2001).
- Sydney Schanberg, 82, American journalist (The New York Times), winner of the Pulitzer Prize for International Reporting (1976).
- Fritzi Schwingl, 94, Austrian slalom and sprint canoeist, world champion (1949, 1951, 1953), Olympic bronze medalist (1948).
- Ray Spencer, 82, English footballer (Darlington, Torquay United).
- Matt Villines, 39, American director (Saturday Night Live), cancer.

=== 10 ===
- Abu Omar al-Shishani, 30, Soviet-born Georgian ISIS militant, airstrike.
- Robert E. Cooper Sr., 95, American judge, member of the Tennessee Supreme Court (1974–1990) and Court of Appeals (1960–1974).
- Debbie DiFranco, American politician, member of the New Hampshire House of Representatives (2014–2016), cancer.
- Amal Dutta, 86, Indian football player and manager.
- John Drysdale, 91, British-born Somaliland diplomat, historian, and writer, founder of the Africa Research Bulletin.
- Katharina Focke, 93, German politician.
- Anatoli Isayev, 83, Russian football player and manager, Olympic champion (1956).
- Fida Muhammad Hassnain, 93, Indian historian.
- Alfred G. Knudson, 93, American geneticist.
- Kem Ley, 45, Cambodian political analyst, shot.
- Robert S. Lucas, 86, American rear admiral.
- Atilla Manizade, 82, Turkish opera singer.
- Salien Medhi, 87, Indian lawyer and politician.
- Adrian Monger, 83, Australian rower, Olympic bronze medalist (1956).
- Mark Ouma, 55, Ugandan sports journalist.
- James Pazhayattil, 81, Indian Syro-Malabar Catholic hierarch, Bishop of Irinjalakuda (1978–2010).
- Larry Scott, 77, American disc jockey.
- David Stride, 58, English footballer (Chelsea), heart attack.
- Harry Wade, 88, Canadian Olympic basketball player (1952).
- Ye Xuanning, 77, Chinese politician.

=== 11 ===
- John Brademas, 89, American politician and educator, member of the U.S. House of Representatives for Indiana's 3rd district (1959–1981), President of NYU (1981–1991).
- Edmond L. Browning, 87, American Episcopal bishop, 24th Presiding Bishop of the Episcopal Church (1985–1997).
- Emma Cohen, 69, Spanish actress (The Glass Ceiling, Voyage to Nowhere, The Grandfather), cancer.
- Stéphane Dakowski, 95, French footballer
- Elaine Fantham, 83, British classicist.
- Corrado Farina, 77, Italian film director, screenwriter and novelist (Baba Yaga).
- Minerva Herrera, 87, Cuban folk singer, heart attack.
- Jim Metzen, 72, American politician, member (since 1987) and President (2003–2011) of the Minnesota Senate, and House of Representatives (1975–1987), lung cancer.
- Robert Mason Pollock, 99, American screenwriter (Dynasty, The Colbys).
- Sir Frederick Smith, 92, Barbadian barrister and politician, Attorney-General of Barbados (1966–1971).
- Kurt Svensson, 89, Swedish footballer, World Cup bronze medalist (1950).
- Jusztin Nándor Takács, 89, Hungarian Roman Catholic prelate, Bishop of Székesfehérvár (1991–2003).
- Scott Olin Wright, 93, American judge, member of the U.S. District Court for Western Missouri (since 1979).

=== 12 ===
- Lorenzo Amurri, 45, Italian author.
- Joseph Antic, 85, Indian field hockey player, Olympic silver medalist (1960).
- Galina Chesnokova, 82, Russian Soviet-era volleyball player (national team), European champion (1963).
- Seamon Glass, 90, American actor (This Is Not a Test, Deliverance, Perry Mason).
- Goran Hadžić, 57, Serbian politician, President of Krajina (1992–1994), brain cancer.
- Peter Johnson, 78, Australian rugby union player.
- Karen Karnes, 90, American ceramist.
- James P. Kerrigan, 89, American politician.
- Kenny Kramm, 55, American pharmacist, founded FLAVORx, sepsis.
- Alvera Mickelsen, 97, American academic and Christian woman's advocate, co-founder of Christians for Biblical Equality.
- Agha Nasir, 79, Indian-born Pakistani broadcaster.
- Kyosen Ōhashi, 82, Japanese television host and politician, acute respiratory failure.
- Antonín Rükl, 83, Czech astronomer.
- Paul Wühr, 89, German author (Das falsche Buch).

=== 13 ===
- George Allen, 84, English footballer (Birmingham City).
- Héctor Babenco, 70, Argentine-born Brazilian film director, producer and screenwriter (Kiss of the Spider Woman, Ironweed, Carandiru), heart attack.
- Marion Campbell, 87, American football player and coach (Philadelphia Eagles, Atlanta Falcons).
- Jim Carmichael, 76, American politician, member of the Ohio House of Representatives (2001–2008).
- John Chandler, 92, British sports shooter.
- Elliott Ward Cheney Jr., 87, American mathematician.
- DTTX, 46, American rapper, complications from heatstroke.
- Garry N. Drummond, 78, American coal executive, chairman and CEO of Drummond Company, complications from cancer.
- Robert Fano, 98, Italian-born American computer scientist.
- Hollis L. Harris, 84, American airline executive, CEO of Continental Airlines (1990–1991) and Air Canada (1992–1996), President of Delta Air Lines (1987–1990).
- Claude Le Ber, 85, French racing cyclist.
- El Lebrijano, 74, Spanish flamenco singer.
- Jacqueline Morreau, 86, American artist.
- Hafsa Mossi, 51–52, Burundian politician, Minister of Regional Integration, member of the East African Legislative Assembly (since 2012), shot.
- William Norris III, 79, American jurist, judge of the Louisiana Court of Appeal for the Second Circuit (1981–2002).
- Celso Peçanha, 99, Brazilian politician, Governor of Rio de Janeiro (1961–1962).
- Bernardo Provenzano, 83, Italian criminal, head of the Corleonesi Mafia faction, complications from bladder cancer.
- Jack Riley, 97, Canadian ice hockey player and executive (Pittsburgh Penguins).
- Jack Rogers, 82, American Presbyterian minister and theologian.
- Carolyn See, 82, American author (Golden Days), cancer.
- Tsai Cheng-fu, 86, Taiwanese Olympic hurdler.
- Elsie Wingrove, 92, Canadian baseball player (Grand Rapids Chicks, Fort Wayne Daisies).
- Zygmunt Zimowski, 67, Polish Roman Catholic prelate, Bishop of Radom (2002–2009), President of the PCPCHCW (since 2009), pancreatic cancer.

=== 14 ===
- Helena Benitez, 102, Filipino politician and educator, Senator (1967–1972).
- Eric Bergren, 62, American screenwriter (The Elephant Man, Frances), liver cancer.
- Ivan Bootham, 76, New Zealand author.
- Rosemary Butcher, 69, British dancer and choreographer, cancer.
- Roger Chanoine, 39, American football player (St. Louis Rams, Cleveland Browns, Jacksonville Jaguars), pancreatic cancer.
- Ramsay Cook, 84, Canadian historian, pancreatic cancer.
- Michael J. Elliott, 65, British journalist and magazine editor (Time, Newsweek, The Economist), cancer.
- Péter Esterházy, 66, Hungarian author, pancreatic cancer.
- Neil Ferguson, 70, Australian rules footballer.
- Gudy Gaskill, 89, American mountaineer, complications from a stroke.
- Lisa Gaye, 81, American actress, singer and dancer (Rock Around the Clock, Drums Across the River).
- Gordon D. Gerling, 94, American politician.
- Joan Gero, 72, American archaeologist.
- Miguel Gutiérrez, 75, Peruvian writer.
- Mohamed Lahouaiej-Bouhlel, 31, Tunisian jihadist, perpetrator of 2016 Nice truck attack, shot.
- Tor Lian, 71, Norwegian sports official, president of the Norwegian Handball Federation (1985–1999).
- Atilio López, 91, Paraguayan football player and coach.
- Troy Mader, 60, American politician, member of the Wyoming House of Representatives (2014–2015), fall from ATV.
- Sharon Runner, 62, American politician, member of the California State Assembly (2002–2008) and Senate (2011–2012, 2015–2016), complications from respiratory failure.
- Donald Stewart, 87, Australian judge, chairman of the National Crime Authority.
- Mike Strahler, 69, American baseball player (Los Angeles Dodgers, Detroit Tigers).
- Athanasius Atule Usuh, 67, Nigerian Roman Catholic prelate, Bishop of Makurdi (1989–2015).
- Hallard White, 87, New Zealand rugby union player (Auckland, national team), Alzheimer's disease.

=== 15 ===
- Ömer Halisdemir, 42, Turkish Maroon Beret.
- Qandeel Baloch, 26, Pakistani model and social media celebrity, strangled.
- Frank Barnett, 82, American politician, Governor of American Samoa (1976–1977).
- Janez Bernik, 82, Slovenian painter.
- Karl E. Case, 69, American economist and academic, developed Case–Shiller index model, Parkinson's disease and multiple myeloma.
- Charles Davis, 83, American jazz saxophonist.
- Howard Dawson, 93, American judge.
- Roger Fletcher, 77, British mathematician. (body discovered on this date)
- Duncan M. Gray Jr., 89, American Episcopalian prelate, Bishop of Mississippi (1974–1993).
- László Kiss, 65, Hungarian Olympic rower.
- Liu Yingming, 75, Chinese mathematician, educator and an academician of the Chinese Academy of Sciences, leukemia.
- Danny Nettey, 47, Ghanaian musician and songwriter.
- Jérôme Owono-Mimboe, 83, Cameroonian Roman Catholic prelate, Bishop of Obala (1987–2009).
- Stanford S. Penner, 95, German-born American aerospace engineer.
- V. F. Perkins, 79, British film critic, aneurysm.
- Roland Prince, 69, Antiguan jazz guitarist.
- Susan Renouf, 74, Australian socialite, ovarian cancer.
- Billy Marshall Stoneking, 68, Australian poet, playwright, and filmmaker.
- Sir Charles Soutar, 96, British air marshal.
- Petru Soltan, 85, Moldovan mathematician and politician, MP (1990–1994).
- Peregrine Eliot, 10th Earl of St Germans, 75, British aristocrat and festival founder.
- Charles Utete, 77, Zimbabwean academic, politician and presidential adviser.

=== 16 ===
- Bonnie Brown, 77, American country singer (The Browns), lung cancer.
- Robert-Ralph Carmichael, 79, Canadian artist and designer (Loonie).
- Francis M. Gibbons, 95, American biographer and religious leader (LDS Church).
- Pete Kapusta, 92, Canadian ice hockey player (Providence Reds).
- Bennie Lenox, 74, American basketball player.
- M. A. Mannan, 84, Bangladeshi politician and neurologist.
- Gordon Massa, 80, American baseball player (Chicago Cubs).
- Robert Burren Morgan, 90, American politician, member of the U.S. Senate for North Carolina (1975–1981), N.C. Senate (1955–1969) and Attorney General (1969–1974).
- Carlos Nine, 72, Argentine illustrator, comics artist and screenwriter.
- Jacques Pennewaert, 76, Belgian Olympic runner.
- Evelyn Chrystalla Pielou, 92, Canadian statistical ecologist.
- Philippe Reinhart, 91, French Olympic sailor.
- Hugo Rietveld, 84, Dutch crystallographer.
- Tariq Selim, 79, Egyptian Olympic footballer.
- Zalman Shapiro, 96, American chemist, a developer of the Nautilus nuclear-powered submarine.
- Oleg Syrokvashko, 54, Belarusian football player and coach (Dinamo Brest).
- Nate Thurmond, 74, American Hall of Fame basketball player (Golden State Warriors, Chicago Bulls, Cleveland Cavaliers), leukemia.
- Kasam Bapu Tirmizi, 86, Indian politician, Gujarat MLA for Gandhinagar (1980–1990).
- Thurston Twigg-Smith, 94, American businessman and philanthropist.
- Kazimieras Uoka, 65, Lithuanian politician.
- Alan Vega, 78, American singer and musician (Suicide).
- Claude Williamson, 89, American jazz pianist.

=== 17 ===
- Wendell Anderson, 83, American politician, Governor of Minnesota (1971–1976), Senator for Minnesota (1976–1978), Olympic silver medalist in ice hockey (1956), pneumonia.
- Achille Casanova, 74, Swiss politician.
- Aníbal José Chávez Frías, 60, Venezuelan politician, Mayor of Sabaneta (since 2004).
- Mel Durslag, 95, American sportswriter.
- Andrzej Grabarczyk, 52, Polish Olympic triple jumper (1988, 1992).
- Michael Healy, 92, British medical statistician.
- Sérgio Henrique Ferreira, 82, Brazilian scientist.
- Kenneth Earl Hurlburt, 88, Canadian politician.
- Paul Johnson, 81, American ice hockey player, Olympic gold medalist (1960).
- J. Tom Lendrum, 88, American politician.
- Sherman Mellinkoff, 96, American physician and gastroenterologist.
- Phyllis Ntantala-Jordan, 96, South African political activist and author.
- James E. Nugent, 94, American politician, Texas Railroad Commissioner.
- Gary S. Paxton, 77, American record producer ("Monster Mash") and singer-songwriter (Skip & Flip), complications from heart surgery and liver disease.
- Rafael Aguilar Talamantes, 76, Mexican politician.
- Raymonde Tillon, 100, French politician, MP for Bouches-du-Rhône (1945–1951).
- Fred Tomlinson, 88, British singer (The Two Ronnies, Monty Python's Flying Circus), composer ("The Lumberjack Song") and critic.

=== 18 ===
- Hassan Afshar, 19, Iranian juvenile offender, execution by hanging.
- Mubarak Begum, 80, Indian playback singer.
- Manuel G. Batshaw, 101, Canadian social worker, founder of Batshaw Youth and Family Centres.
- Mubarak Begum, 80, Indian playback singer.
- Richard Budge, 69, British businessman, prostate cancer.
- Antony Copley, 79, British historian.
- Uri Coronel, 69, Dutch sports director (Ajax Amsterdam).
- Medi Dinu, 107, Romanian painter.
- Bloeme Evers-Emden, 90, Dutch teacher, child psychologist and Holocaust survivor.
- Randolph George, 92, Guyanese Anglican bishop.
- John Hope, 67, English footballer (Sheffield United).
- Agata Karczmarek, 52, Polish Olympic gymnast (1980) and long jumper (1988, 1992, 1996).
- John Kerr, 66, American editor and author (A Most Dangerous Method), lung cancer.
- James Kriel, 74, South African air force general.
- Heinz Lucas, 95, German football player and manager.
- Jack Meadows, 82, British astronomer and information scientist.
- Nikolaus Messmer, 61, Kazakh-born Kyrgyz Roman Catholic prelate, Apostolic Administrator of Kyrgyzstan (since 2006).
- Jeffrey Montgomery, 63, American LGBT rights activist, heart attack.
- Aldo Monti, 87, Mexican actor.
- Billy Name, 76, American photographer (Andy Warhol), heart failure.
- Dolliver Nelson, 84, Grenadian jurist, President of the International Tribunal for the Law of the Sea (2002–2005).
- Matilda Rapaport, 30, Swedish alpine free-skier, avalanche.
- Mladen Stilinović, 69, Croatian artist.
- Les Stocker, 73, British wildlife expert, founder of Tiggywinkles.
- Abu Wardah, 39, Indonesian militant leader (Mujahidin Indonesia Timur), shot by police.

=== 19 ===
- Bommi Baumann, 68, German author and political activist.
- Ray Bell, 90, New Zealand rugby union player (Otago, national team).
- Betsy Bloomingdale, 93, American socialite and philanthropist, complications from a cardiac condition.
- Randolph Bowe, 97, American baseball player (Chicago American Giants, Kansas City Monarchs, Indianapolis Clowns).
- Chief Zee, 75, American football mascot (Washington Redskins).
- Aukai Collins, 42, American islamist.
- Dimitri, 80, Swiss clown.
- Carlos Gorostiza, 96, Argentine playwright, theatre director and novelist.
- Carmen Hernández, 85, Spanish catechist, co-founder of the Neocatechumenal Way.
- Nev Hewitt, 95, Australian politician, Queensland MP for Mackenzie (1956–1972) and Auburn (1972–1980).
- Garry Marshall, 81, American director, producer, writer, and actor (Happy Days, Pretty Woman, Murphy Brown), pneumonia.
- Tom McCready, 72, Scottish footballer (Wimbledon).
- Gordon Mowrer, 80, American politician, Mayor of Bethlehem, Pennsylvania (1974–1978, 1987).
- William Park, 97, English footballer (York City, Blackpool).
- John Pidgeon, 69, British broadcaster and writer.
- Tom Pollock, 72, American Olympic rower.
- Anthony D. Smith, 76, British historical sociologist.
- Tamás Somló, 68, Hungarian musician and singer (Omega, Locomotiv GT), cancer.

=== 20 ===
- Dominique Arnaud, 60, French cyclist, cancer.
- Radu Beligan, 97, Romanian actor, director and essayist.
- Dick Corballis, 70, New Zealand English literature academic (Massey University).
- William Gaines, 82, American journalist (Chicago Tribune) and academic (University of Illinois), awarded Pulitzer Prize (1976, 1988), Parkinson's disease.
- André Isoir, 81, French organist.
- James Allen Johnson, 92, American army general.
- Walid Juffali, 61, Saudi billionaire businessman (E. A. Juffali and Brothers) and diplomat, cancer.
- György Kéri, 66, Hungarian biochemist, Széchenyi Prize winner (2013).
- Egon Matijevic, 94, Croatian-born American chemist.
- Ray Moreton, 74, New Zealand rugby union player (Southland, Canterbury, national team).
- Jim Pressdee, 83, Welsh cricketer (Glamorgan).
- Mohammed Shahid, 56, Indian field hockey player, Olympic champion (1980), liver and kidney disease.
- Pavel Sheremet, 44, Belarusian journalist, car bombing.
- Mark Takai, 49, American politician, member of the U.S. House of Representatives for Hawaii's 1st district (since 2015) and the Hawaii House of Representatives (1994–2015), pancreatic cancer.

=== 21 ===
- Adolph Bachmeier, 78, Romanian-born American footballer.
- Milford Burriss, 79, American politician.
- Bill Cardille, 87, American television host (Chiller Theater, Night of the Living Dead, Studio Wrestling), cancer.
- Chor Yeok Eng, 86, Singaporean politician, MP for Bukit Timah (1966–1984).
- Tsering Chungtak, 31, Tibetan beauty queen, Miss Tibet 2006, heart attack.
- Dick Donnelly, 74, Scottish footballer and journalist.
- Bernard Dufour, 93, French painter.
- John Garton, 74, British Anglican prelate, Bishop of Plymouth (1996–2005).
- Roger Godement, 94, French mathematician.
- Dennis Green, 67, American football coach (Minnesota Vikings, Arizona Cardinals, Northwestern Wildcats), cardiac arrest following a heart attack.
- Joy Hardon, 94, Australian Olympic fencer (1956).
- William F. Hickey Jr., 87, American politician, member of the Connecticut Senate (1960–1970), mayor of Stamford (1963).
- Luc Hoffmann, 93, Swiss ornithologist and conservationist, co-founder of the World Wildlife Fund.
- Sid Hurst, 97, New Zealand farmer, chairman of Lincoln College Council (1980–1985).
- Jen Jacobs, 60, Australian cricketer (national team).
- Meraj Muhammad Khan, 77, Pakistani politician.
- Amnon Linn, 92, Israeli politician, member of the Knesset (1967–1969, 1973–1988).
- Thomas R. McCarthy, 82, American racehorse trainer and owner (General Quarters), melanoma.
- Iwo Cyprian Pogonowski, 94, Polish writer and inventor.
- Des Rea, 72, Northern Irish boxer.
- Don Soderquist, 82, American executive (Walmart).
- Lewie Steinberg, 82, American Hall of Fame bassist (Booker T. & the M.G.'s), cancer.
- Bill Tully, 90, American tennis player.
- Molly Turner, 93, American news anchor (WPLG).

=== 22 ===
- Martin M. Block, 90, American physicist.
- Geraldine Branch, 107, American gynecologist.
- Charles Brantley, 91, American horse breeder.
- Dave Bald Eagle, 97, American Lakota Chief and actor.
- Chen Da, 79, Chinese nuclear scientist, educator and academician (Chinese Academy of Sciences).
- Joe Derrane, 86, American accordion player.
- Dominic Duval, 71, American free jazz bassist, lymphoma.
- Franca Faldini, 85, Italian writer and actress (Where Is Freedom?, Poverty and Nobility, Man, Beast and Virtue).
- Ursula Franklin, 94, German-born Canadian scientist and academic (University of Toronto).
- Julius Freeman, 89, American fighter pilot (Tuskegee Airmen), recipient of the Congressional Gold Medal, heart attack.
- Sir David Goodall, 84, British diplomat, High Commissioner to India (1987–1991).
- Lee Grant, 84, British-born New Zealand actress.
- Betty Guy, 95, American watercolor artist.
- Viktor Kryzhanivskyi, 66, Ukrainian painter and artist.
- Luo Yinguo, 62, Chinese politician, cancer.
- Thomas de Morawitz, 93, Spanish Olympic skier.
- Geir Myhre, 62, Norwegian Olympic ice hockey player (1980, 1984) and coach (national team).
- Evin Nolan, 86, Irish painter.
- Elizabeth Phelan, 96, American politician.
- Leyla Sayar, 76, Turkish actress.
- Norma Levy Shapiro, 87, American judge, member of the U.S. District Court for Eastern Pennsylvania (since 1978).
- Shawshank tree, c. 180, North American white oak featured in The Shawshank Redemption.
- Zeke Smith, 79, American football player (Auburn Tigers).
- Thomas Sutherland, 85, Scottish-born American academic and Islamic jihad hostage.
- Anita Tefkin, 84, American figure skater.
- Jouko Turkka, 74, Finnish theatre director and writer.
- Samane Vignaket, 89, Laotian politician.

=== 23 ===
- Neelabh Ashk, 70, Indian Hindi poet.
- Alfred Bailey, 84, Australian cricketer.
- Małgorzata Bartyzel, 60, Polish politician, member of the Sejm for Łódź (2005–2007).
- Bill Cotty, 69, American politician, member of the South Carolina House of Representatives (1994–2008), lung cancer.
- Kantilal Desai, 84, Indian cricketer.
- Geronimo Dyogi, 67, Filipino Olympic judoka (1972).
- Carl Falck, 109, Norwegian businessman, nation's oldest living man.
- Thorbjörn Fälldin, 90, Swedish politician, Prime Minister (1976–1978, 1979–1982).
- Denis Foreman, 83, South African-born English cricketer (Sussex) and footballer (Brighton & Hove Albion).
- Mari Gilbert, 52, American activist, matricide.
- Alan Goldberg, 75, Australian jurist, Judge of the Federal Court (1997–2010).
- Kate Granger, 34, British physician and fundraiser, desmoplastic small-round-cell tumor.
- Sheilla Lampkin, 70, American politician, member of the Arkansas House of Representatives (since 2011), ovarian cancer.
- Edward B. McClain Jr., 71, Liberian politician.
- Mangala Moonesinghe, 84, Sri Lankan politician and diplomat, High Commissioner to the UK (2000–2002) and India (1995–2000, 2002–2005).
- Boy-Boy Mosia, 31, South African footballer (Juventus, Chelsea, AmaZulu).
- Joe Napolitano, 67, American television director (Quantum Leap, The X-Files) and assistant director (The Untouchables, Scarface), cancer.
- S. H. Raza, 94, Indian artist.
- Jean Ricardou, 84, French writer.
- Lodovico Sommaruga, 88, Italian Olympic rower.
- Alina Surmacka Szczesniak, 91, Polish-born American food scientist.
- Harold Duane Vietor, 85, American judge, member of the US District Court for Southern Iowa (1979–2016), stroke.
- Peter Wenger, 72, Swiss footballer.

=== 24 ===
- Mangal Bagh, 42–43, Pakistani militant leader (Lashkar-e-Islam), drone strike.
- Tom Clegg, 81, British television and film director.
- Gordon Dixon, 86, Canadian biochemist.
- Alastair Duncan, 63, British army officer, Chief of Staff for UNAMSIL (2001), perforated ulcer.
- Håkon Fimland, 72, Norwegian hurdler and politician.
- Keith Gemmell, 68, British musician (Audience, Stackridge, Pasadena Roof Orchestra), throat cancer.
- Abe Goldberg, 87, Polish-born Australian executive.
- Marto Gracias, 75, Indian footballer (national team, Salgaocar), heart attack.
- Frank Hodsoll, 78, American art historian, cancer.
- Ian King, 79, Scottish footballer (Leicester City F.C.).
- Jan Kmenta, 88, Czech-American econometrician.
- Bohuslav Kokotek, 67, Czech Lutheran clergyman and politician.
- Eliza Lawrence, 80, Canadian politician, MLA from the Northwest Territories (1983–1987).
- Steve Nagy, 97, American baseball player (Pittsburgh Pirates, Washington Senators).
- Marni Nixon, 86, American singer (The King and I, West Side Story, My Fair Lady) and actress (The Sound of Music), breast cancer.
- Horacio Olivo, 83, Puerto Rican actor and singer.
- Bob Parker, 84, British accounting scholar.
- Bishnodat Persaud, 82, Guyanese economist.
- Conrad Prebys, 82, American philanthropist, cancer.
- Don Roberts, 83, American ice hockey coach (Gustavus Adolphus College), heart disease.
- Chris Costner Sizemore, 89, American writer, subject of The Three Faces of Eve, heart attack.
- Parwati Soepangat, 84, Indonesian Buddhist leader.
- Orest Subtelny, 75, Ukrainian-born Canadian historian.

=== 25 ===
- Jerzy Bahr, 72, Polish diplomat, Ambassador to Russia (2006–2010) and Ukraine (1997–2001), Director of the National Security Bureau (2005), cancer.
- Brenda Banks, 66, American archivist.
- Allan Barnes, 66, American jazz saxophonist (The Blackbyrds), heart attack.
- Daphne Ceeney, 82, Australian paraplegic athlete, Paralympic champion (1960, 1964).
- J. Harwood Cochrane, 103, American transportation executive, founder of Overnite Transportation.
- Artur Correia, 66, Portuguese footballer (Benfica, Sporting, national team), stroke.
- Bülent Eken, 92, Turkish football player (Galatasaray) and coach (national team).
- Pierre Fauchon, 87, French politician, member of the Senate for Loir-et-Cher (1992–2011).
- Arundhati Ghose, 76, Indian diplomat, ambassador to the UN-Geneva, South Korea and Egypt, cancer.
- Edward Gopsill, 94, British army officer.
- Halil İnalcık, 100, Turkish historian, multiple organ failure.
- Dwight Jones, 64, American basketball player (Atlanta Hawks, Chicago Bulls, Houston Rockets), Olympic silver medalist (1972).
- Eric Kuhne, 64, American-born British architect, heart attack.
- Sinikka Kukkonen, 68, Finnish orienteer and ski orienteer, world champion (1975).
- Tim LaHaye, 90, American Christian author (Left Behind), stroke.
- Mollie Lowery, 70, American advocate for the homeless and mentally ill, cancer.
- James M. Nederlander, 94, American Broadway theater owner and producer (Nederlander Organization).
- Slobodan Novak, 91, Croatian writer.
- Tom Peterson, 86, American retailer and television personality, Parkinson's disease.
- Nicasio Silverio, 85, Cuban Olympic swimmer.
- Franklin Van Antwerpen, 74, American judge, member of the United States Court of Appeals for the Third Circuit (since 2004).

=== 26 ===
- Roy Adler, 85, American mathematician.
- Anne Balfour-Fraser, 92, British film producer.
- Charles Bilezikian, 79, American retail executive, co-founder of Christmas Tree Shops, pancreatic cancer.
- Henry Connor, 93, New Zealand botanist.
- Denis Dubourdieu, 67, French winemaker, brain cancer.
- Roger Ekins, 89, British biophysicist.
- Solomon Feferman, 88, American philosopher and mathematician.
- John H. Flood, 77, American politician, member of the Massachusetts House of Representatives (1981–1991).
- Jeffrey Grey, 57, Australian military historian.
- Jacques Hamel, 85, French Roman Catholic priest, stabbed.
- C.-H. Hermansson, 98, Swedish politician, MP (1963–1985), leader of the Left Party-Communists (1964–1975).
- David A. Katz, 82, American judge, member of the US District Court for Northern Ohio (since 1994), cancer.
- Mohamed Khan, 73, British-Egyptian film director (Ayyam El Sadat, Mr Karate, Before the Summer Crowds).
- Heinz Kiehl, 73, German wrestler, Olympic bronze medalist (1964).
- Hossein Kohkan, 85, Iranian Kurdish architect and caveman.
- Horst Kuttelwascher, 78, Austrian Olympic rower.
- Maggie Macdonald, 63, Scottish Gaelic singer.
- Per G. Malm, 67, Swedish missionary, general authority of the Church of Jesus Christ of Latter-day Saints, cancer.
- Forrest Mars Jr., 84, American billionaire businessman (Mars, Incorporated), heart attack.
- JT McNamara, 41, Irish jockey.
- Miss Cleo, 53, American television psychic, metastatic colon cancer.
- Jerry Molyneaux, 60, Irish Gaelic games administrator.
- Hiroko Nakamura, 72, Japanese classical pianist, colon cancer.
- Sandy Pearlman, 72, American record producer and band manager (Blue Öyster Cult, The Clash, Black Sabbath), pneumonia as a complication from a stroke.
- Pia Pera, 60, Italian novelist (Lo's Diary).
- Sylvia Peters, 90, British continuity announcer and actress (BBC TV).
- E. Melvin Porter, 86, American politician, member of the Oklahoma Senate (1965–1987).
- Dave Syrett, 60, English footballer (Swindon, Mansfield, Peterborough), brain tumour.
- Norma Wendelburg, 98, American composer.

=== 27 ===
- Jean Briggs, 87, American-born Canadian anthropologist, expert in Inuit studies and language.
- Paco Cano, 103, Spanish photojournalist.
- LaVon Crosby, 92, American politician, member of the Nebraska Legislature (1989–2000).
- Jack Davis, 91, American cartoonist and illustrator (Tales from the Crypt, The Vault of Horror, Georgia Bulldogs), co-founder of Mad.
- Jerry Doyle, 60, American talk show host and actor (Babylon 5), founder of EpicTimes.
- Sue Gibson, 64, American-British cinematographer and second unit director (Resident Evil, The Holiday, Alien vs. Predator).
- Doug Griffin, 69, American baseball player (Boston Red Sox).
- Dominik Hrušovský, 90, Slovak Roman Catholic prelate, Auxiliary Bishop of Bratislava-Trnava (1992–1996) and Apostolic Nuncio to Belarus (1996–2001).
- Piet de Jong, 101, Dutch politician and naval officer, Minister of Defence (1963–1967), Prime Minister (1967–1971).
- Otto Junkermann, 87, American businessman.
- James Alan McPherson, 72, American writer (Elbow Room), awarded Pulitzer Prize (1978), pneumonia.
- Máximo Mosquera, 88, Peruvian footballer.
- Milton Murayama, 93, American Nisei novelist and playwright.
- Gerard Noel, 89, British author and editor (The Catholic Herald).
- Einojuhani Rautavaara, 87, Finnish composer, complications following hip surgery.
- Neelamraju Ganga Prasada Rao, 88, Indian geneticist and plant breeder.
- Ford Spinks, 89, American politician.
- Richard Thompson, 58, American cartoonist (Cul de Sac), Parkinson's disease.
- Pat Upton, 75, American singer-songwriter (Spiral Starecase).

=== 28 ===
- Boualem Bessaïh, 86, Algerian politician, Minister of Foreign Affairs (1988–1989).
- Bob Brown, 92, American basketball player (Providence Steamrollers, Denver Nuggets).
- Conrad K. Cyr, 84, American federal judge, member of the U.S. Court of Appeals for the First Circuit (1989–1997) and the District Court for the District of Maine (1981–1989).
- Mahasweta Devi, 90, Indian writer (Hajar Churashir Maa), blood infection and kidney failure.
- Gnanakoothan, 77, Indian Tamil poet.
- Norman Guthkelch, 100, British paediatric neurosurgeon.
- Richard Grant Hiskey, 87, American chemist.
- Marianne Ihlen, 81, Norwegian muse.
- Patrick Jourdain, 73, British bridge player and journalist.
- Vladica Kovačević, 76, Serbian footballer.
- Lachhu Maharaj, 71, Indian tabla player.
- Monte Nitzkowski, 86, American water polo coach.
- Seeking The Gold, 31, American thoroughbred racehorse, euthanized.
- Joseph L. Taylor, 75, American mathematician.
- Sheikh Hussain Zakiri, 76, Indian Muslim scholar.
- Émile Derlin Zinsou, 98, Beninese politician, President (1968–1969).

=== 29 ===
- Antonio Armstrong, 42, American football player (Miami Dolphins, BC Lions), shot.
- Ken Barrie, 83, British voice actor (Postman Pat) and singer, liver cancer.
- Doris Benegas, 64, Venezuelan-born Spanish Basque politician, leader of the Castilian Left, abdominal tumor.
- Keith L. Brown, 91, American businessman and diplomat, Ambassador to Lesotho (1982–1983) and Denmark (1989–1992).
- José Cabrera, 95, Mexican Olympic basketball player.
- Madhusudan Dhaky, 88, Indian architectural historian.
- Lucille Dumont, 97, Canadian singer.
- Daasebre Dwamena, 37, Ghanaian musician.
- Zelda Fichandler, 91, American stage producer and director (Arena Stage), heart failure.
- Tommy George, 87, Australian Aboriginal elder.
- Vivean Gray, 92, British-born Australian actress (Neighbours, The Sullivans, Prisoner).
- Anne Hepburn, 90, Scottish missionary and teacher.
- Braj Kachru, 84, Indian linguist.
- Yowabu Magada Kawaluuko, 86, Ugandan politician.
- Dennis Kelly, 71, American actor (Damn Yankees, Into the Woods, Annie Get Your Gun), lung cancer.
- Patrick Lalor, 90, Irish hurler (Laois) and politician, TD (1961–1981), MEP (1979–1994).
- Danny Nykoluk, 82, Canadian football player (Toronto Argonauts).
- Kauko Salomaa, 86, Finnish Olympic speed skater.
- Burt Talcott, 96, American politician, member of the United States House of Representatives from California's 12th and 16th congressional districts (1963–1977).

=== 30 ===
- José Arcia, 72, Cuban baseball player (San Diego Padres, Chicago Cubs).
- William Bell, 70, Canadian writer, cancer.
- Alan Brice, 78, American baseball player (Chicago White Sox).
- Igor de Rachewiltz, 87, Italian historian of Mongol studies.
- Gloria DeHaven, 91, American actress (Summer Stock, Mary Hartman, Mary Hartman, Out to Sea), complications from a stroke.
- Clive Foxell, 86, English physicist and author.
- Peter Gossage, 69, New Zealand author and illustrator (How Māui Slowed the Sun).
- Nigel Gray, 69, British record producer (Outlandos d'Amour).
- András Hajnal, 85, Hungarian mathematician.
- Derek Hatfield, 63, Canadian sailor.
- Ignatius Huang Shou-cheng, 93, Chinese clandestine Roman Catholic prelate, Bishop of Funing (since 2005).
- Anna Marchesini, 62, Italian actress, voice actress and comedian, rheumatoid arthritis.
- Joe A. McClain, 88, American politician.
- B. G. Perry, 84, American politician and judge, complications from diabetes and heart disease.
- Ed Ross, 50, American photographer, motorcycle accident.
- Dave Schwartz, 63, American meteorologist (The Weather Channel), stomach cancer.
- Ralph Stewart, 90, American football player and coach.
- Ritva Vepsä, 75, Finnish actress (Time of Roses), lung cancer.

=== 31 ===
- Anwar Ali Cheema, 81, Pakistani politician.
- Chiyonofuji Mitsugu, 61, Japanese sumo wrestler, pancreatic cancer.
- Thomas Danson Jr., 82, American politician.
- Gwynn ap Gwilym, 66, Welsh author, cancer.
- Bobbie Heine Miller, 106, South African-born Australian tennis player.
- Bill Holdsworth, 87, English cricketer (Yorkshire).
- Fazil Iskander, 87, Soviet and Russian writer.
- Inez Y. Kaiser, 98, American public relations expert.
- Mariana Karr, 66, Argentine actress (Alborada, Amorcito corazón, Juro Que Te Amo).
- Penny Lang, 74, Canadian folk musician.
- Destin Onka Malonga, 28, Congolese football player, fall.
- Peter Martell, 57, Canadian football player.
- Mike Mohede, 32, Indonesian singer, heart attack.
- Eric Moon, 93, British-born American librarian.
- Seymour Papert, 88, South African-born American mathematician, computer scientist and educator.
- John G. Rossi, 55, American major general, suicide by hanging.
- Sylvie Roy, 51, Canadian politician, Quebec MNA for Lotbinière and Arthabaska (since 2003), acute hepatitis.
- Angelika Schrobsdorff, 88, German writer.
- Marshall Starks, 77, American football player (New York Jets, Edmonton Eskimos).
- Bob West, 74, American ethnomusicologist and record producer, cancer.
- Jean-Claude Wicky, 70, Swiss photographer.
