= Tirmizi (surname) =

Tirmizi, al-Tirmidhi, Termezi or Tarmizi (Persian: ترمذی, Arabic: الترمذي) — nisba means "from Termez" (in Persian, Arabic, etc.) and may refer to:

- Al-Tirmidhi — Islamic scholar, collector of hadith.
- Al-Hakim al-Tirmidhi — one of the great early authors of Sufism.
- Jahm bin Safwan al-Tirmidhi — Islamic theologian.
- Sayyid Ali Tirmizi, commonly known as Pir Baba — Sufi, supporter of the Mughal emperor Babur.
- Kasam Bapu Tirmizi — Indian politician.
- Salahuddin Tirmizi — Pakistani politician.
- Taufiq Tirmizi — Pakistani cricketer.
- Tarmizi Taher — Indonesia's Minister of Religious Affairs from 1993 to 1998.
- Tarmizi Johari — Bruneian international footballer.
- Izham Tarmizi — Malaysian footballer.
- Wan Mohamad Tarmizi — Malaysian association football referee.
- Munjik Tirmizi — Persian poet.
- Suhel Tirmizi — Indian lawyer.
- Adib Sabir Tirmizi — Persian poet.
- Burhan al-Din Tirmizi — Medieval Sufi philosopher.
- Syed Abdul Shakoor Tirmizi — Pakistani religious leader.

== See also ==
- Jami' al-Tirmidhi, also known as Sunan at-Tirmidhi — one of "The Six Books".
