= Umashankar =

Umashankar may refer to:

- Uma–Maheshvara, the Hindu deities Uma (Parvati) and Maheshvara (Shiva)
- Pooja Umashankar, Indian-Sri Lankan actress
- Umashankar Akela, Indian politician
- Umashankar Argariya, Nepalese politician
- Uma Shankar Bajpai, Indian diplomat
- Uma Shankar Dikshit, Indian politician
- Umashankar Gupta, Indian politician
- Umashankar Joshi, Indian poet, scholar and writer
- Uma Shankar Mishra, Indian independence activist and politician
- Umashankar Muljibhai Trivedi, Indian lawyer and politician
- Uma Shankar Pandey, Indian social worker
- Uma Shankar Singh (disambiguation), Indian politician
