= Chen Da =

Chen Da may refer to:

- Chen Da (Water Margin), a fictional character in the Chinese classical novel Water Margin
- Chen Da (sociologist) (1892–1975), Chinese sociologist
- Chen Da (singer) (1906–1981), Taiwanese folk singer
- Chen Da (scientist) (1937–2016), Chinese nuclear scientist
- Da Chen (1962–2019), Chinese-American author
