= Amurri =

Amurri is an Italian surname which is most prevalent in the eastern coastal region of Marche and is also to be found among the Argentinian and American Italian diaspora. Notable people with the surname include:

- Antonio Amurri (1925–1992), Italian radio and television writer, author, and lyricist
- Eva Amurri (born 1985), American actress, daughter of Franco
- Franco Amurri (born 1958), Italian filmmaker and producer, father of Eva
- Lorenzo Amurri (1971–2016), Italian musician and writer
