= Howard G. Livingston =

American politician

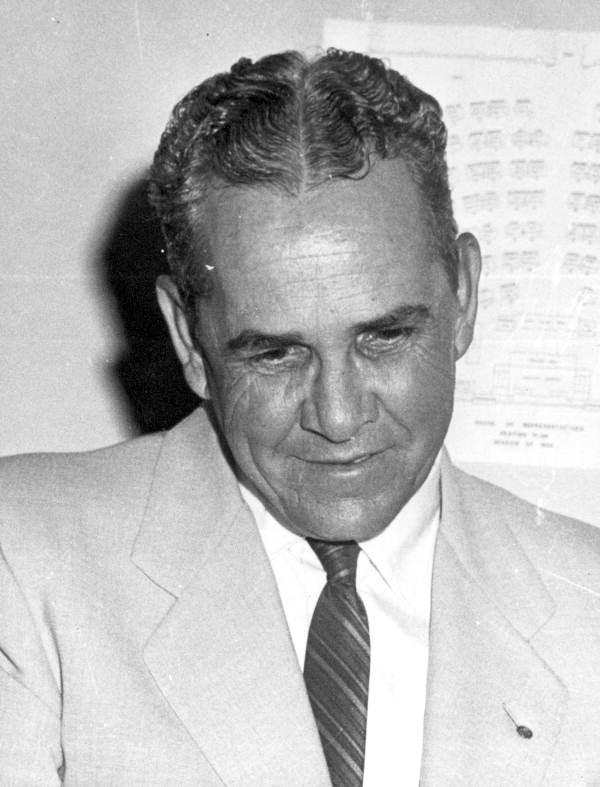
- Livingston in 1961

Member of the Florida House of Representatives from Highlands County
- In office 1943–1944
- In office 1955–1962

Personal details
- Born: February 19, 1907 Marshall, Texas, U.S.
- Died: June 1, 1975 (aged 68)
- Party: Democratic

Howard G. Livingston (February 19, 1907 – June 1, 1975) was an American politician and Florida lawyer and judge in Highlands County. He served as a Democratic member of the Florida House of Representatives.

== Life and career ==
Livingston was born in Marshall, Texas. He later moved to Orlando and then Sebring, Florida.

In Sebring in 1940 he established what is now the oldest law firm in Highlands County, Florida. His son, James Livingston, and grandson, Robert Livingston, would go on to practice at the firm, which still operates today.

Livingston also served as County Judge. During his tenure, Judge Livingston refused to sign a liquor application for a fraternal organization after the County Tax Collector and Beverage Director approved the same due the fact that Highlands County had voted to be a dry county under the Florida Constitution; Livingston's ruling was affirmed by the higher courts.

Livingston served in the Florida House of Representatives from 1943 to 1944 and again from 1955 to 1962.

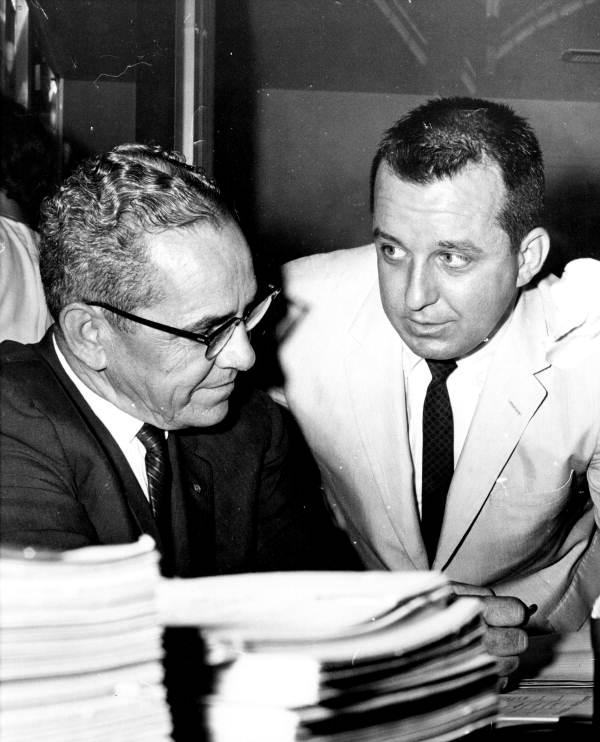
Livingston (left) with Joe A. McClain, 1961

Livingston died on June 1, 1975, at the age of 68.
