= Maurice LaRue =

American politician

Member of the South Dakota House of Representatives from the 29th district
- In office January 14, 2003 – January 11, 2005
- Preceded by: Willard Pummel
- Succeeded by: Thomas J. Brunner

Personal details
- Born: August 13, 1947 Mason City, Iowa
- Died: July 28, 2012 (aged 64) Sturgis, South Dakota
- Party: Republican

Maurice LaRue (August 13, 1947 – July 28, 2012) was an American politician who served in the South Dakota House of Representatives from the 29th district from 2003 to 2005.

He died on July 28, 2012, in Sturgis, South Dakota at age 64.
