= Jack Meadows =

Jack Meadows may refer to:

- Jack Meadows (The Bill), a character on the TV series The Bill
- Jack Meadows (astronomer) (1934–2016), British astronomer and information scientist
