= Hiskey =

Hiskey is a surname. Notable people with the surname include:

- Babe Hiskey (born 1938), American golfer
- Clarence Hiskey (1912–1998), Soviet spy in the United States
- Richard Grant Hiskey (1929–2016), American chemist

== See also ==
- Hickey (surname)
