= Una Mujer Como Yo =

Studio album by Albita
- Released: 1997
- Label: Crescent Moon/Epic
- Producer: Emilio Estefan, Jr.

Albita chronology
Dicen Que (1996)	Una Mujer Como Yo (1997)	Son (2000)

Una Mujer Como Yo is an album by the Cuban musician Albita, released in 1997.

The album peaked at No. 9 on Billboard's Tropical Albums chart. It was nominated for a Grammy Award for "Best Tropical Latin Album".

== Production ==
The album was produced by Emilio Estefan, Jr. It was recorded more quickly than Albita's previous two albums, and moved beyond traditional Cuban music styles. Albita wrote "Tocame con un Beso" and "Y No Tengo Guano"; Kike Santander contributed to the writing and arranging of some of Una Mujer Como Yo's songs.

== Critical reception ==
Professional ratings
Review scores
Source	Rating
AllMusic	4/5 stars
The Commercial Appeal	3/4 stars
MusicHound World: The Essential Album Guide	3.5/5 stars
Orlando Sentinel	4/5 stars

Miami New Times deemed the album "a shrill pastiche of merengue, salsa, cumbia, vallenato, Cuban jazz riffs and even, God help us, rap." The Orlando Sentinel wrote that "the up-tempo songs celebrate Albita's musical roots and influences but don't sound like a formal excursion into the past." The San Diego Union-Tribune declared that "Albita, with her deep, rich voice, could sing any style and make it sound easy."

Newsday called the songs "full pedal-to-the-metal jams," writing that "never has Albita sounded so agreeably aggressive on disc." The Commercial Appeal stated that "the Cuban with the beefy alto fuses folk instruments to modern production without sacrificing one syncopated, seductive note." The Baltimore Sun determined that Albita's voice "is dark and lustrous, with all the sweet sonority of a trombone, and she uses that to great effect against the brass and percussion of 'Me Demito' or the breathlessly rhythmic 'Ven a Verme'"; the paper later listed the album as the tenth best of 1997.

== Track listing ==
No.	Title	Length
1.	"Una Mujer Como Yo"
2.	"Me Derrito"
3.	"Ta' Bueno Ya"
4.	"Rie Rie"
5.	"El Amor Llegó"
6.	"Ven a Verme"
7.	"Tócame con un Beso"
8.	"Y No Tengo Guano"
9.	"Tanta Lucha Pa' Que"
10.	"Año Nuevo, Vida Nueva"
