= Albita Rodríguez =

American singer (born 1962)

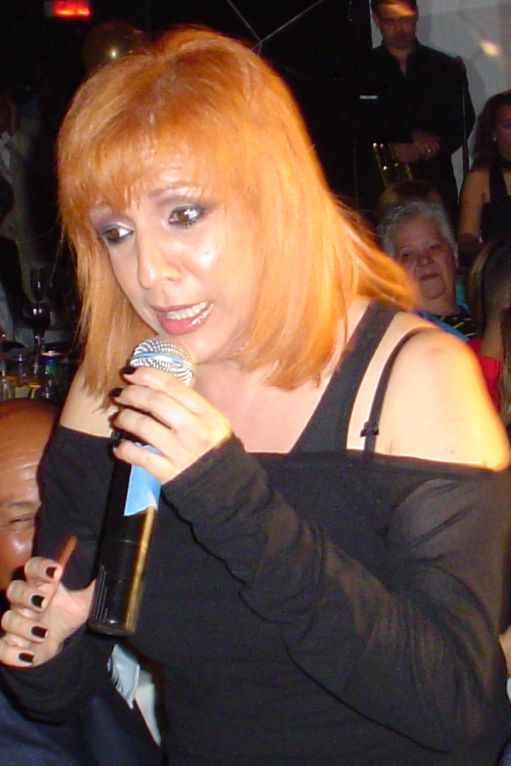
Rodríguez in 2009

Albita Rodríguez (born 6 June 1962 in Havana), known in her music career simply as Albita, is a Cuban singer.

== Biography ==
Albita was born in Havana. Her parents, Martín Rodríguez and Minerva Herrera were well-known Cuban folk music singers (who performed as Martín y Minerva or better known as Mima y Pipo), which ensured Albita's exposure to the world of Cuban country music from her early years. Working professionally since her teen years, by the late eighties she had attained recognition among national interpreters of Cuban folk music (Música Guajira).

In 1988, her first album, Habrá Música Guajira (There Will Be Guajira Music), was released. In 1990, work commitments took her to Colombia, and from there she defected to the United States on 15 April 1993, making the southern city of Miami her place of permanent residence.

Once in Miami, where she noted in a 2019 interview that she was "practically unknown", Albita eventually got the attention of celebrities like Gianni Versace, Quincy Jones, Madonna, Sylvester Stallone, Paco de Lucia, Tom Cruise, Nicole Kidman, among others that soon became her fans.

In 1994 she was signed by Emilio Estefan's Crescent Moon label and her first single in the U.S., "Qué Manera de Quererte" ("What a Way of Loving You"), was released. In 1995, her album No Se Parece a Nada (Like Nothing Else) saw daylight.

Her career in the U.S. has produced success, including multiple Grammy and Emmy nominations and wins. She travels extensively, performing in such places as Australia, all Europe, Malaysia, Africa and of course all of Latin America. She has shared the stage with Celia Cruz, Willy Chirino, Phil Collins, Tony Bennett, Gilberto Gil, Juan Luis Guerra, Daniela Mercury, Miriam Makeba, Arturo Sandoval, Paquito D'Rivera and Melissa Etheridge.

She has been invited to perform for four Presidential functions, including two inaugurations. In 2004 she founded her own label "Angel's Dawn Records" under which she produced and launched her CD Albita Llegó that won her two Grammys in the category of Best Contemporary Tropical Album. Her music has also been featured in the soundtrack of several American and foreign films.

In 2005, Albita was cast for a major role in the Broadway produced musical play The Mambo Kings, where she worked for six months to rave reviews.

Albita also hosts her own show La Descarga con Albita (Jam Session with Albita).

In May 2016 she performed in the musical Carmen la Cubana, which reimagines Oscar Hammerstein II's Carmen Jones—itself based on Georges Bizet's 1875 opera—during the Cuban revolution. Directed by Christopher Renshaw, Carmen la Cubana played at the Théâtre du Châtelet in Paris and later at the Sadler's Wells Theatre in London.

In October 2019, she staged two major free concerts in Hialeah and Miami Beach, as part of those cities' celebrations of National Hispanic Pride month.

== Discography ==
- Habrá Música Guajira (There Will Be Guajira Music) (1988)
- Cantare (1992)
- Si se da la siembra (1991)
- No Se Parece a Nada (Unlike Anything Else) (1995)
- Dicen Que (They Say That) (1996)
- Una Mujer Como Yo (A Woman Like Me) (1997)
- Son (Son) (2000)
- Hecho a Mano (Handmade) (2002)
- Albita Llegó (Albita Is Here) (2004)
- Albita Live (2006)
- Mis Tacones (2009)
- Albita (2017)

== See also ==
- List of Cubans
