= LAMP Community =

LAMP Community (originally the Los Angeles Men's Place) is a Los Angeles–based nonprofit organization located in Skid Row that seeks to permanently end homelessness, improve health, and build self-sufficiency among men and women living with severe mental illness.

Lamp Community also played a prominent role in the movie The Soloist.

== History ==
The Los Angeles Men's Place was founded by Mollie Lowery and Frank Rice in 1985 as a night-time drop-in centre for homeless men with mental problems. The pair later expanded the service to provide permanent supportive housing and complementary social support services. In 2016, LAMP merged with OPCC to form a new organization, The People Concern

== Services ==
Lamp Community operates under, and helped to pioneer, the Housing First model. It offers immediate access to affordable, safe and permanent housing without requiring sobriety or participation in treatment. Once settled in their home, new tenants are surrounded with customized services such as mental health treatment, drug recovery, healthcare, budgeting, visual performing arts, job opportunities, and other supports to help them achieve their goals and become part of their community. LAMP employees are sometimes former tenants. There is also a volunteer program for those wanting to contribute to the foundation.

== See also ==
- Housing First
- Nathaniel Ayers
