= Solvophoresis =

Solvophoresis is a spontaneous motion of dispersed particles in a mixed solvent induced by a gradient of solvent concentration. Solvophoresis was experimentally established by Marek Kosmulski and Egon Matijevic. Solvophoresis is similar to diffusiophoresis.
