= Suhel Tirmizi =

Suhel Tirmizi, also known as M.M. Tirmizi, is a prominent attorney and human rights advocate, practicing at the Gujarat High Court, in India. In December 2009, he was awarded the Minority Rights Award by the National Minorities Commission for "his efforts for rights of the riot affected in Gujarat."
