= William Wondriska =

William Wondriska (June 29, 1931 - July 8, 2016) was an American illustrator and writer. In addition to his work in promotional design and advertising, Wondriska wrote eleven books for children, including A Long Piece of String (1963), The Sound of Things (1958) and All by Myself (1963).

Wondriska was born in Oak Park, Illinois. He studied at Yale University and the Art Institute of Chicago.

He served as president of Hartford Art School, which now offers a William Wondriska Graphic Design Award to graphic design students of merit and to support visiting designers. In 1995 Wondriska was among five university regents and former regents who filed a lawsuit seeking to block Hartford University from absorbing money historically controlled by the Art School Board.

In 1961 Wondriska founded Wondriska Associates, a design firm which became known for its branding work with such clients as the Walt Disney Company, Children's Television Workshop, the Art Institute of Chicago, the National Gallery of Art, and the Boston Symphony. In the 1980s, Wondriska Associates' won awards for their work for United Technologies Corp. and Aetna. In 1994 Wondriska Associates merged with Dennis Russo Design to become Wondriska Russo Associates.

The 2010 reissue of A Long Piece of String by Chronicle Books instigated a revival of interest in his work, with Liz Rosenberg of the Boston Globe labeling the book "a miracle of simplicity."

Wondriska lived in Concord, Massachusetts, until his death from complications of Parkinson's disease in July 2016.
