= Egon Matijevic =

- Born: April 27, 1922; Otočac, Kingdom of Serbs, Croats and Slovenes (now Croatia)
- Died: July 20, 2016 (aged 94)
- Education: University of Zagreb (B.Sc., Ph.D.)
- Known for: methods for obtaining uniform particles
- Awards: ACS Kendall Award (1972); ACS Langmuir Distinguished Lecturer Award (1985); The Graham Prize awarded by German Colloid Society (1985); ACS Ralph K. Iler Award (1993)
- Scientific career
- Fields: Colloidal chemistry, surface chemistry
- Workplaces: Clarkson University

Egon Matijevic (27 April 1922 – 20 July 2016) was an American chemist. He earned his B.Sc. and Ph.D. in chemistry from the University of Zagreb. After specialization at the University of Cambridge he continued to work at the Clarkson University. He is the author of more than 550 scientific papers in colloidal and surface chemistry with numerous applications in medicine and industry. Matijevic was a member of American Chemical Society, American Association for Crystal Growth, World Academy of Ceramics, International Association of Colloid and Interface Scientists and honorary member of American Ceramic Society, German Colloid Society, Chemical Society of Japan and Materials Research Society of Japan.

== See also ==
- Solvophoresis
