= Steve Tupper =

Canadian sailor

Steve Tupper (6 February 1941 in Vancouver – 4 July 2016) was a Canadian sailor who competed in the 1968 Summer Olympics.
