= Roger Ekins =

British biophysicist (1926–2016)

Roger Ekins FRS (22 September 1926 – 26 July 2016) was a British biophysicist and professor at University College London. He was awarded the 1998 Edwin F. Ullman Award.

== Life ==
Ekins earned a PhD from Cambridge University. He revolutionized endocrinology by enabling the measurement of tiny quantities of analytes at levels so low as to be beyond chemical analysis, thus transforming endocrinology from a clinical descriptive specialty to a quantitative science. He was elected a fellow of the Royal Society, and later received the Queen's Medal.

He was initially a researcher at the Barnato Joel Laboratory, at the Middlesex Hospital Medical School, where he later headed the Department of Molecular Endocrinology. He was the inventor of saturation analysis and radioimmunoassay, creating assays for thyroxine, triiodothyronne, free thyroxine, and free triiodothyronine. He established the mathematical models for competitive limited reagent immunoassays as contrasted to excess reagents typified by immunoradiometric assays. His prediction of higher sensitivity for the latter was confirmed by the creation by Daya Kishore Hazra working in Ekins laboratory in 1975 of the ultrasensitive TSH assay which revolutionized the management of thyroid diseases by allowing for diagnosis of both hyperthyroidism and hypothyroidism by measuring TSH, as it could differentiate low levels of hyperthyroidism from normal levels, as contrasted to the hitherto used radioimmunoassay which was less sensitive and could not differentiate low from normal levels. The thyroidal assays of thyroxine/triiodothyronine/free thyroxine and free triiodothyronine and immunometric assays for thyroid-stimulating hormone constitute today the most widely used hormonal assays in the world. He later developed multianalyte spot assays using multiple antibodies and a Confocal microscope reading laser signals emitted by the antibody spots corresponding to different analytes. This was the prototype of array technology assays widely used in both proteomics as well as genomics. He worked on endemic goiter and mental retardation in New Guinea. Rosalyn Yalow and Solomon Berson received the Nobel Prize in 1977 for their radioimmunoassay of Insulin, using methods similar to those used earlier by Roger Ekins for measuring the thyroid hormones.

References. 1. 2. Hazra DK, Ekins RP, Edwards R E: Immunoradiometric assays for Glycoprotein Hormones, in Radioimmunoassay and Related Procedures in Medicine, 1977, published by IAEA, Vienna. 3. Hazra DK: Msc Nuclear Medicine Thesis, University of London, 1975.

== Death ==
He died on 26 July 2016.
