= Minerva Herrera =

Cuban singer (1929 - 2016)

- Born: February 26, 1929; Sancti Spíritus, Cuba
- Died: July 11, 2016 (aged 87); Miami, Florida, U.S.
- Occupation(s): Singer, author
- Years active: 1940s–2010s
- Musical career
- Genres: decima campesina; folk; latin
- Instrument: Vocals
- Formerly of: Martín y Minerva

Minerva Herrera (February 26, 1929 – July 11, 2016) was a popular Cuban folk singer, who performed as part of the duo Martín y Minerva. She is perhaps best known as the mother of Albita, the Grammy-winning Cuban-American singer, producer and composer. Under the name of Mima, she appeared on a popular segment of her daughter's show, La descarga con Albita.

== Biography ==
As a youngster, Herrera showed an affinity for decima campesina, a type of Cuban folk song. Later she would publish four books on the musical genre.

With Martín Rodríguez she formed the music duo Martín y Minerva. In 1952, her partner became her second husband. The team rose to prominence on Palmas y Cañas, a Cuban television program. The couple had two children together, Angel Miguel and Albita. She also has two children from a previous marriage.

Her daughter, Albita is a popular recording artist. In 2010, Minerva began appearing on her daughter's television show, La descarga con Albita, which airs on Mega TV. Minerva was featured on "Mima's Counsels," a popular segment of the show.

Herrera died of a heart attack in her Miami home on Monday, July 11, 2016.
