= Chen Da (sociologist) =

Chinese sociologist

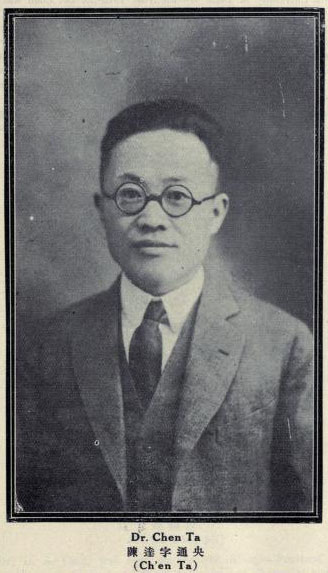
Chen Da (1892－1975)

Chen Da, art name Tongfu, (Chinese: 陈达; 1892–1975) was a Chinese sociologist.

== Biography ==
Chen was born in Lihe Village, Yuyao, Zhejiang Province. From 1912 to 1916, he studied at Tsinghua School in Beijing. From 1916 to 1923, he studied in the United States under the Boxer Indemnity scholarship program, and obtained his doctorate degree from Columbia University.

Upon graduation, he returned to China to teach at Tsinghua. When Tsinghua School transformed into Tsinghua University in 1929, Chen became a professor and the chair of the sociology department. During the Sino-Japanese War, he moved south with the university to Kunming, where he became head of the university's National Census Research Institute. He also became head of department and professor at the National Southwestern Associated University's sociology department.

Post 1949, Chen served as professor at the Central University of Finance and Economics, professor and principal of the Labor Cadre School of the Ministry of Labor, deputy director of the Department of Labor Protection of the Ministry of Labor, and as a member of the National Committee of the Chinese People's Political Consultative Conference.

Chen died on January 16, 1975.

== Works ==
Chen's teaching and studies specialised in population, labor and immigration. In 1923, he compiled a report for the US Department of Labor on the effects of, and reasons behind, Chinese emigration to the Dutch East Indies, Malacca, the Philippines, Hawaii, France and the Transvaal in South Africa. In 1929, his book, China's Labor Issues, a comparative work on industrial relations in China, was published by the Commercial Press. In 1934, a revised collection of Chen's lecture notes on population issues were published by the Commercial Press, under the title Population Issues, as a college textbook. The textbook introduces the ideas of previous population theorists, such as Thomas Malthus, outlines problems related to population size and quality, and argues for a “one-for-one replacement”, in which the Chinese population would be reduced through restricting couples to two children. Chen's 1938 research report, The Overseas Chinese of Southeast Asia and Fujian and Guangdong Society, drew upon his 1934 study into the socioeconomic conditions of the Fujian and Guangdong Provinces, and his previous research into the overseas Chinese population.
