= Vladimir Troyepolsky =

Vladimir Vladimirovich Troyepolsky (Russian: Влади́мир Влади́мирович Троепо́льский; August 2, 1954 – July 8, 2016) was a journalist and media manager for both Soviet and modern Russia. He was deputy CEO of the holding information All-Russia State Television and Radio Broadcasting Company (2001–08, 2009–16), CEO and president of the TV channel 2×2 (1991–97), director-general of NTV Plus (1997–98), and JSC Petersburg – Channel 5 (2008–09). He was also a member of the Russian Television Academy (2007–16).

He died July 8, 2016.

== Honors and awards ==
- Order of Friendship (2006) - for achievements in the field of culture, the press, broadcasting and many years of fruitful work.
- Order of Honour (South Ossetia) (2009) - for outstanding contribution to the organization of objective coverage of the events in South Ossetia in August 2008.
