= Lo's Diary =

1995 novel by Pia Pera

- Author: Pia Pera
- Original title: Diario di Lo
- Translator: Ann Goldstein
- Language: Italian
- Genre: Fiction
- Publication date: 1995
- Publication place: Italy
- English publication date: 1999
- Media type: Print
- Pages: 363
- ISBN: 0964374021

Lo's Diary (Italian: Diario di Lo) is a 1995 novel (ISBN 0964374021) by Pia Pera, retelling Vladimir Nabokov's 1955 novel Lolita from the point of view of "Dolores Haze (Lolita)".

It depicts Dolores as a sadist and a controller of everyone around her; for instance, she enjoys killing small animals. It also says that Dolores did not die in childbirth, Humbert Humbert did not kill Quilty, and that all three are still alive. Most notably, the novel takes the interpretation of Humbert as being unattractive or repulsive: he even loses his teeth at one point.

== Reception ==
Reception was mixed, with critics agreeing that it did not live up to the source material. Entertainment Weekly said it "drags down Nabokov's blackly satiric vision, set in atomic-age suburban America, to the level of a cynical 1990s teen sex comedy".

Kirkus Reviews considered it "a mix of wit and tedium in near-equal parts". Publishers Weekly found it to be "compelling", with "Nabokov's subtle and elegant prose" being replaced by an "authentic adolescent tone"; Time, however, felt that the prose was "undistinguished" and "far too precocious and knowing for even the brightest kid".

== Legal issues ==
In 1998, Dmitri Nabokov (Vladimir's son, and executor of his father's literary estate) sued to stop the publication of the book in England, France, and the United States, claiming copyright infringement. Farrar, Straus and Giroux cancelled their planned publication pending the outcome of the lawsuit; eventually, a settlement was reached whereby Nabokov would contribute a preface to the book and receive half the royalty payments with a $25,000 advance (which he donated to PEN International).

== See also ==
- The Wind Done Gone
