= Betty Guy =

American painter

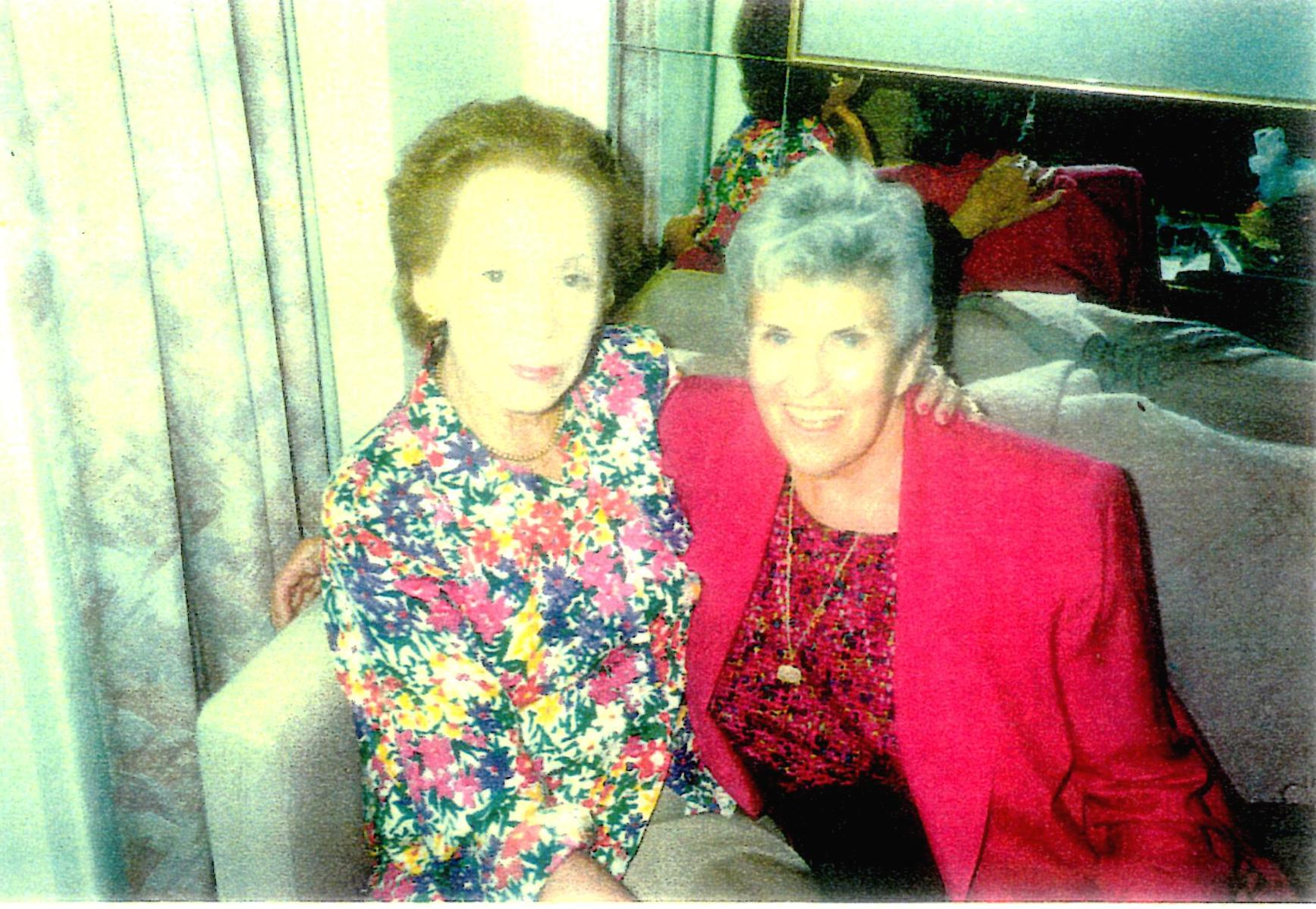
- Betty Guy (right) with Elaine Steinbeck.
- Born: September 15, 1920; San Francisco, California, U.S.
- Died: July 22, 2016 (aged 95); San Francisco, California, U.S.
- Known for: Watercolor painting

Betty Guy (September 15, 1920 – July 22, 2016) was an American artist, most notable for her work in watercolor landscapes.

== Biography ==
Betty Guy was born in San Francisco, California in the 1920s. She was the daughter of Joseph and Fania Lipschitz and had three older brothers: Boris, George and Irving. Joseph and Fania Lipschitz emigrated from Vilna, Lithuania to the United States with the three older boys, and Guy was born shortly after - the first of her family born in the United States.

Guy graduated from Lowell High School. She earned a bachelor's degree at San Francisco State University in English literature and attended graduate courses at the University of California at Berkeley. She furthered her studies at the Art's Student League in New York, the Alliance Française and L'Académie de la Grande Chaumiere in Paris, France.

== Early career ==
When Guy was in graduate school at the University of California, Berkeley, she began taking art classes and used watercolors for the first time. She left Berkeley and began traveling. It was in Europe that she honed her skills as a landscape artist. Paris soon became one of her favorite subjects for her work. Her first exhibition was at the Gallerie Henri Tronche on Rue de La Boete. At that exhibition, she sold enough of her work to remain in Europe and continue painting.

Guy returned to the states and began displaying her work at Gumps gallery in San Francisco, eventually becoming the longest continuing artist to display art with Gumps, surviving eight directors. Her first museum exhibit was at the California Palace of the Legion of Honor in San Francisco on December 15, 1961. Her exhibit was called "the most delightful show of the year" by then art and music critic for the San Francisco Chronicle, Alfred Frankenstein. Guy continued to travel and paint landscapes all over the world and amass an archive of hundreds of original paintings.

== Betty Guy and the Steinbecks ==
In 1957, Guy's friend Pat Covici, who worked for Viking Press publishing, commissioned Guy to travel to Bruton, England to paint a picture of one of Viking's authors as a surprise Christmas gift. That author was John Steinbeck. While Guy was in a field overlooking the Steinbeck's cottage, she was asked by Steinbeck's wife, Elaine Steinbeck what she was doing. Guy confessed to Ms. Steinbeck that she was sent by Mr. Covici and was then invited into the Steinbeck's home. This was the beginning of a long friendship between Guy and the Steinbecks until Elaine's death in 2003. This story was documented in a limited print book authored by Guy titled Surprise for Steinbeck published in 1992. Surprise for Steinbeck is in the Bodleian Library Oxford Collection.

== Other Notable Exhibitions ==
Betty Guy's artwork has been shown in galleries across the globe, including the Performing Arts Library and Museum in San Francisco, the American Library in Bucharest, Romania, the American Embassy in Bonn, Germany, the Curaçao Museum in Netherlands Antilles, Amerika Haus Exhibit in Vienna, Austria, Yoseido Gallery, Tokyo, Japan, and Gallerie Henri Tronche, Paris, France. She was a long-time exhibitor at the University of California San Francisco Medical Center Alumni House.

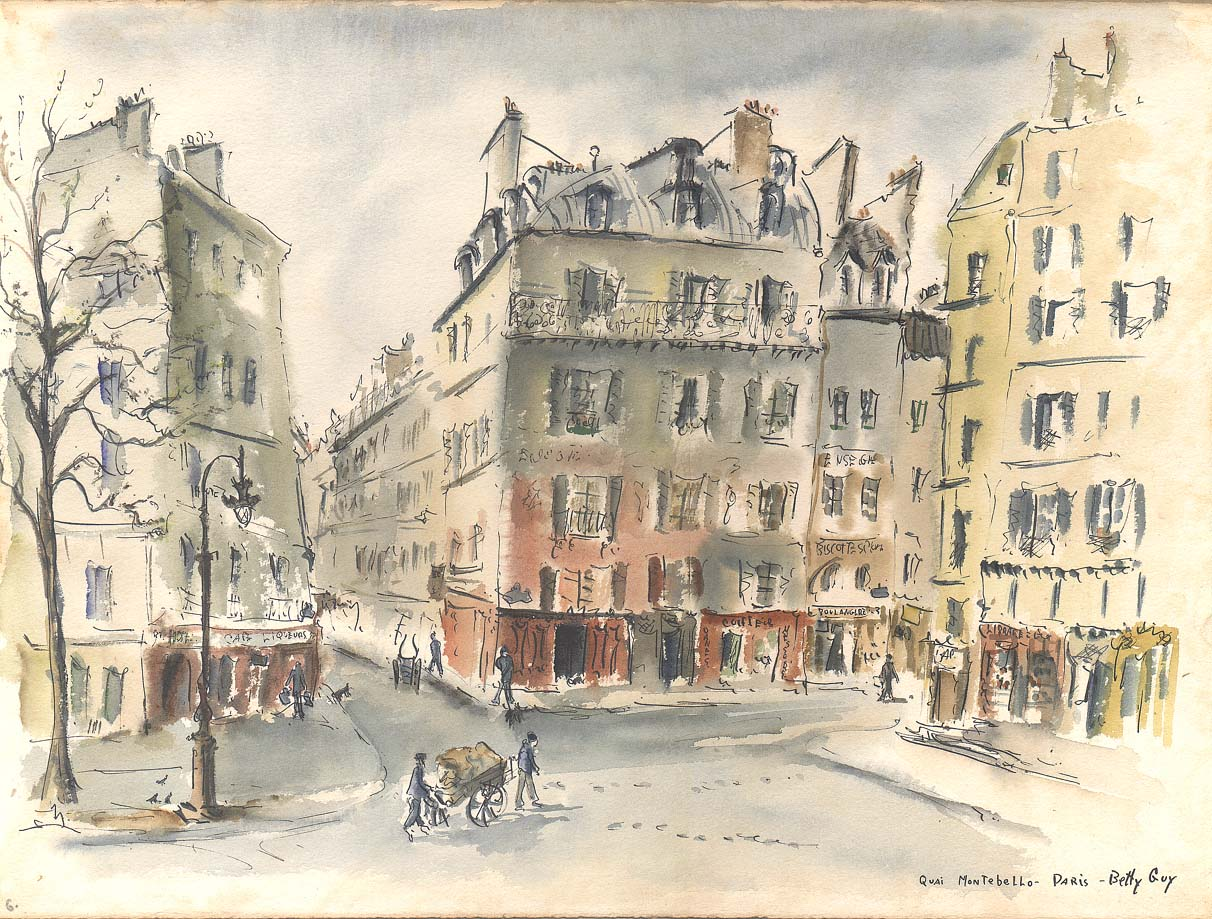
Betty Guy Painting Quia Montebello, Paris

== Commercial art ==
Betty Guy also worked as a commercial artist for many companies and organizations. Just a few of the organizations she has either been commissioned to do work for or worked as the house artist for are the San Francisco Symphony, the New Haven Symphony, The Mark Hopkins Hotel, Stanford Court Hotel in San Francisco, The Port of San Francisco, and Royal Viking Cruise lines. Ms. Guy remained the house artist for the San Francisco Opera and the San Francisco Ballet until her death.

== Notable owners of Betty Guy's works ==
When Queen Elizabeth II visited San Francisco with Prince Philip, Duke of Edinburgh in the 1980s, she was presented with a Betty Guy painting as a gift from the Port of San Francisco. The Port director was sent a letter from Buckingham Palace that read "thank you for the splendid painting by Betty Guy...the picture will always awaken some very happy memories of their stay in your lovely city." Other prominent recipients of Betty Guy's work include Gianni Versace, Placido Domingo, Luciano Pavarotti and the aforementioned Steinbecks.

== Later life ==
Betty Guy completed paintings in France, Germany, Japan, Israel, Austria, Great Britain, Chile, China and many other countries throughout the world. Later in her career she experimented with mono prints and other mediums. She remained the company artist for the San Francisco Opera and participated as an artist in the Hearts in San Francisco public art installation. She was also the resident artist for Gumps for over three decades. Until her death, Guy lived in Bernal Heights, overlooking her native San Francisco.

== Death ==
Betty Guy died on July 22, 2016.
