= Galina Chesnokova =

Galina Alexandrovna Chesnokova (Russian: Гали́на Алекса́ндровна Чесноко́ва; née Motoraeva (Russian: Мотора́ева); March 12, 1934 – July 12, 2016) was a Soviet volleyball player for the USSR national team from 1962 to 1963. Chesnokova was a silver medalist at the 1962 world championship, the European champion in 1963, and champion of the USSR in 1963; she was named Master of Sports of the USSR in 1958, and honored Master of Sports of Russia in 2003. She played for Burevestnik of Moscow until 1960 and for CSKA from 1960 to 1964.

Chesnokova was married to Yuri Chesnokov, a Soviet volleyball player, coach and Master of Sports, from 1933 to 2010.

After her playing career, Chesnokova worked as an engineer.

Chesnokova died on July 12, 2016, after severe and prolonged illness.
