= Gerald Sherratt =

American politician (1931–2016)

- Born: November 6, 1931; Cedar City, Utah, U.S.
- Died: July 8, 2016 (aged 84); Cedar City, Utah, U.S.
- Education: Southern Utah University
- Occupations: Cedar City mayor and Southern Utah University president

Gerald R. Sherratt (November 6, 1931 – July 8, 2016) was the mayor of Cedar City, Utah, and the president of Southern Utah University.

== Early life ==
Gerald R. Sherratt was born on November 6, 1931, in Cedar City, Utah. Graduating from Branch Agricultural College (which would later become Southern Utah University) in 1951, Sherratt later received a bachelor's degree in elementary education and a master's degree in educational administration from Utah State University.

== Career ==
Sherratt spent 16 years as the president of the Cedar City School from 1982 to 1997. Under his tutelage, enrollment increased from 1,800 in 1982 to 5,500 students in 1997.

== Mayor of Cedar City ==
At the age of 70, Sherratt was elected to mayor of Cedar City in 2001.
