= Mollie Evans =

Mollie Evans (8 April 1922 – 1 July 2016) was "one of the most influential British antique dealers of the latter part of the 20th century".

She was born Mary Isobel Simpson, into a large farming family of longstanding in Eamont Bridge, Cumberland.

Her shop in Richmond was called "Mollie Evans, Antique Furniture, Books, and Interesting Items".
