= The Epic Times =

Epic Times
- Company type: Private
- Industry: News
- Headquarters: United States
- Key people: Jerry Doyle (Founder); Elaine Kunda (CEO)
- Number of employees: 200

Epic Times was a news website network started by Jerry Doyle. EpicTimes featured contributors such as former deputy undersecretary of defense in the George W. Bush administration Jed Babbin, and actress and author Anita Finlay.
