= Per G. Malm =

Second Quorum of the Seventy
- 3 April 2010 – 26 July 2016
- Called by: Thomas S. Monson

Personal details
- Born: Per Gösta Malm; 12 September 1948; Jönköping, Sweden
- Died: 26 July 2016 (aged 67); Gothenburg, Sweden
- Cause of death: Cancer

Per Gösta Malm (12 September 1948 – 26 July 2016) was a general authority of the Church of Jesus Christ of Latter-day Saints (LDS Church) from 2010 until his death. Malm was the first general authority who was a resident of Sweden at the time of his call.

Malm was raised by Latter-day Saint parents. His father had read the Book of Mormon and then told the missionaries he was meeting with that he wanted to be baptized. Malm first met his wife, Ingrid Agneta Karlsson, at a campground while their families were traveling to the Swiss Temple. They were later married in the Swiss Temple and are the parents of eight children.

At age 16, Malm was called as a construction missionary for the LDS Church. He worked as a bricklayer on buildings in Sweden, Finland, Germany, and the Netherlands. After serving a short time in the Swedish military, Malm served as a regular missionary in the church's Sweden Stockholm Mission.

Malm earned degrees in business and public law from the University of Gothenburg and a Swedish law degree (LLM) from the University of Lund.

Malm spent much of his career as an employee of the LDS Church's Office of the Presiding Bishopric, overseeing building maintenance, budgets and other temporal affairs of the church. He was for a time the Director of Temporal Affairs in the church's Europe Area.

Malm served in the LDS Church as a counselor in the presidency of the Sweden Gothenburg Mission, when it was organized in the 1970s. He also served as a branch president, high councilor, counselor in a stake presidency, stake president, and as the church's public affairs director for Sweden. From 2003 to 2006, Malm was president of the Norway Oslo Mission. In 2008 he was called as an area seventy. While in this position, Malm was the area supervisor for the Centers for Young Adults program. He was appointed as a general authority and member of the Second Quorum of the Seventy in April 2010. His assignments as a general authority included serving from August 2011 to August 2012 as an Assistant Executive Director in the church's Curriculum Department, which also included a role as an adviser to the church's magazines. From 2012 to 2014, he served as a counselor in the presidency of the church's Europe East Area.

Malm died of cancer at his home in Göteborg, Sweden on 26 July 2016.
