= Salien Medhi =

Indian politician

Salien Medhi (died 2016) was an Indian lawyer and politician, belonging to the Revolutionary Communist Party of India. He was a state legislator in Assam 1967-1972.

== Early career ==
Medhi entered the Guwahati High Court in 1962. His legal career developed rapidly thereafter. He became a prominent member of the Guwahati High Court Bar Association. As an RCPI leader he was closely linked to Kalaguru Bishnu Prasad Rabha. Medhi helped Rabha during the latter's underground days.

== Legislator ==
Medhi was elected to the Assam Legislative Assembly from the Jalukbari constituency in the 1967 election. He got 14,384 votes (61.60%). Medhi lost the Jalukbari seat in the 1972 Assam Legislative Assembly election. He finished in second place with 5,764 votes (25.09%).

== Later years ==
At different occasions he represented the Bar Association at meetings overseas. During his trips abroad he met with personalities such as Fidel Castro and Nelson Mandela.

During his later years, Medhi was an active participant in the meetings of the Octogenarians' Club of Guwahati. Salien Medhi died on 10 July 2016 at the age of 87.
