= Inez Y. Kaiser =

American educator, public relations expert, and entrepreneur

- Born: Inez Yeargan; April 22, 1918; Kansas City, Kansas, U.S.
- Died: July 31, 2016 (aged 98); Overland Park, Kansas, U.S.

Inez Yeargan Kaiser (April 22, 1918 – July 31, 2016) was an American educator, public relations expert, and entrepreneur. She was the first African-American woman to run a public relations company with national clients.

== Early life and education ==
Kaiser was born in Kansas City, Kansas. She grew up in a time when African Americans in the South were not allowed the opportunity of a higher education. But she was determined to gain an education. Her father told her "no one can take away from you what’s in your head.”

Kaiser earned a bachelor's degree in education from Pittsburg State University in 1941. Later, she earned a master's degree from Columbia University. She also studied at University of Chicago, Rockhurst University, and Dartmouth College. She also undertook special training in radio and TV network, retailing and merchandising in fashions.

== Career ==
Kaiser taught home economics for more than 20 years in public schools. She was featured in Seventeen magazine "as one of the most outstanding home economics teachers in the country." In 1957, she founded Inez Kaiser & Associates, which was both the first public relations firm led by an African-American woman and the first business owned by an African American to open in Kansas City. By the early 1960s, after securing 7 Up and other big accounts, she had become the first African-American woman to run a public relations firm with national clients. She was the first African-American woman to join the Greater Kansas City Chamber of Commerce and the Public Relations Society of America, the profession's trade association.

She was awarded an honorary Law degree from Lincoln University in 1986.

The Greater Kansas City chapter of the Public Relations Society of America established a scholarship in her name in 2021.

== Writing career ==
Kaiser began writing a column, "Fashion Wise and Otherwise", which was published in African-American newspapers and magazines around the country for its over 30 year run. During the column's popularity, Kaiser leveraged her readership to promote the use of pictures of models of color, giving them employment in areas where they had never been considered before. She also wrote a home economics column, "Hints for Homemakers" that also was published in African-American newspapers and reached a readership of over 8 million people nationwide. She wrote a column in The Kansas City Star titled "As I See It".

Kaiser also wrote a cookbook titled Soul Food Cookery, which was published in 1960. It is featured in the Smithsonian Institute’s National Museum of African American History and Culture.

== Political views ==
In 1958, Kaiser organized a group in Kansas City, Twin Citians, who picketed department stores in the city to protest discrimination.

Kaiser was a life-long Republican, and she advised the Nixon and Ford administrations on issues related to minority women and business. Through her work in political advising, she was named the National Minority Advocate of the Year in 1997. According to her son, she voted for Barack Obama.
