= Valentino Zeichen =

Italian poet and writer

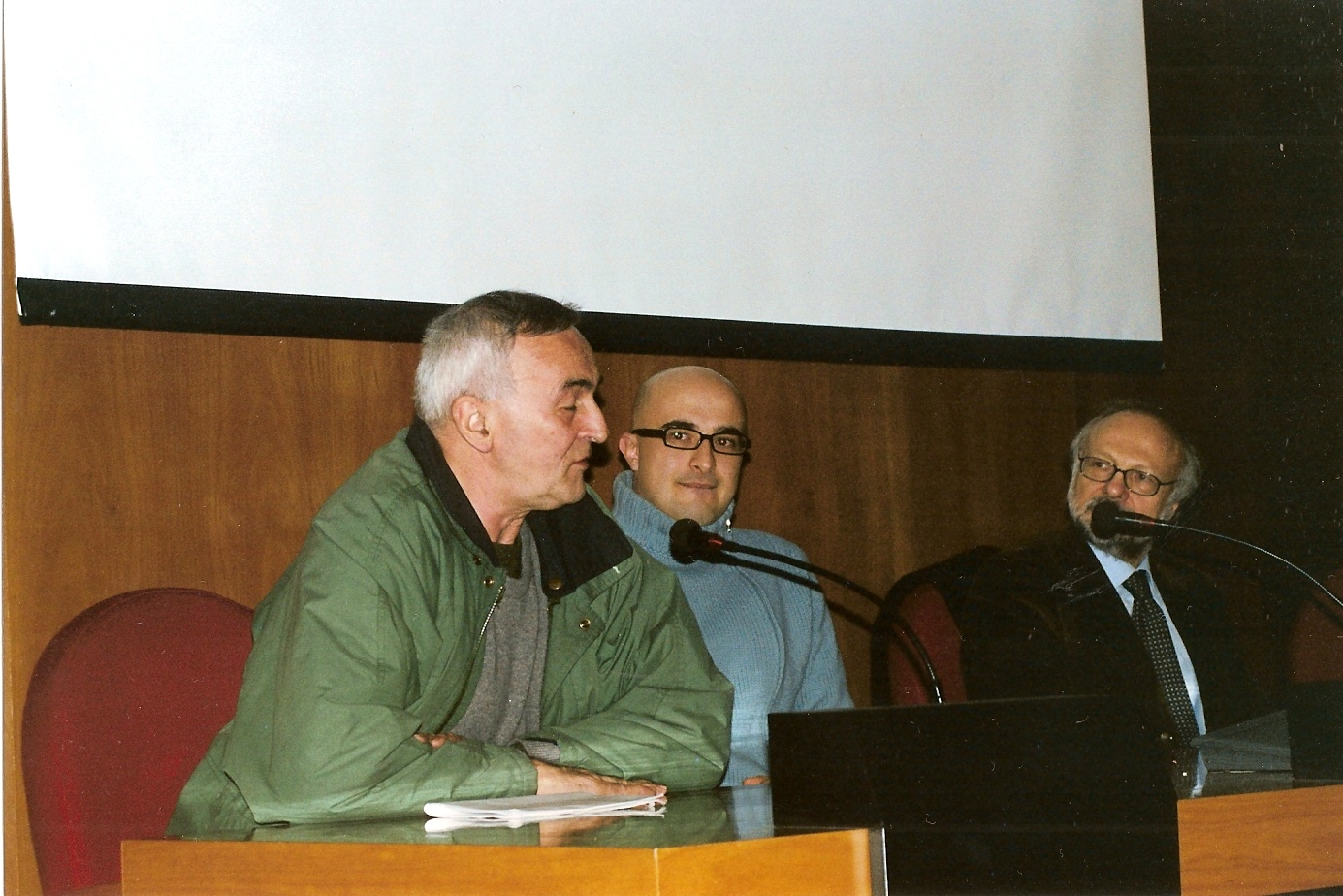
Valentino Zeichen (left) at a literary award ceremony.

Valentino Zeichen (24 March 1938 – 5 July 2016) was an Italian poet and writer.

== Biography ==
Zeichen's origins are somewhat obscure, and his year of birth is unclear. In German language the word Zeichen means "sign", and it has been suggested that his birth name is Giuseppe Mario Moses, an almost certainly Jewish surname. Zeichen, however, denied this claim.

Born in Fiume, Italy, (now Rijeka, Croatia), the son of an Italian-speaking Istrian gardener, Zeichen moved with his family to Parma as a refugee. In 1950 they moved to Rome, where Zeichen lived for the rest of his life, next to the Via Flaminia.

He began to write poems at the age of 18, influenced by surrealist authors like Breton and Prévert. His first work was published in 1969 on the literary review Nuova Corrente. Zeichen's first novel, Tana per tutti, was released in 1983.

Zeichen's poetry has been praised for its ability to quickly hook the reader, and has a subtle humour within it. A literary award named after him, the Premio Zeichen, was held yearly before he died.

== Bibliography ==
- Area di rigore (1974)
- Ricreazione (1979)
- Tana per tutti (1983, novel)
- Museo interiore (1987)
- Gibilterra (1991)
- Metafisica Tascabile (1997)
- Ogni cosa a ogni cosa ha detto addio (2000)
- Matrigna (2002, novel)
- Passeggiate romane (2004)
- Poesie. 1963-2003 (2004)
- Neomarziale (2006)
- Il palazzo della scherma (2006)
- La Refezione (2007)
- Aforismi d'autunno (2010)
- Poesie giovanili. 1958-1967 (2010)
- Il testamento di Anita Garibaldi (2011)
- Casa di rieducazione (2011)
- Macchie dipinte (2014)
- La sumera (2015, novel)
