= Pia Pera =

Italian novelist, essayist, and translator

- Born: 12 March 1956; Lucca, Italy
- Died: 26 July 2016 (aged 60); Lucca, Italy
- Occupation: Writer

Pia Pera (12 March 1956 – 26 July 2016) was an Italian novelist, essayist, and translator.

Pera was born in Lucca, Tuscany. Her father, Giuseppe Pera, was a jurist and Russian translator, known from translating most of Alexander Pushkin's work into Italian. Pera followed her father's footsteps and learned Russian, but from very early on expressed an interested in having a career as a writer. Her first collection of short stories, La bellezza dell'asino ("The Beauty of the Donkey"), was published in 1992.

Pera got international notoriety with her 1995 novel Lo's Diary (Italian: Diario di Lo), a retelling of Vladimir Nabokov's novel Lolita from the point of view of the female title character. In later years she specialized in novels connected to her passion for gardening.

Pera was also a professor of Russian literature at the University of Trento and a translator of Russian novels and an essayist. Her last work was the semi-autobiographic novel Al giardino ancora non l’ho detto ("I haven't told my garden yet").

Pera died at 60 years old of motor neuron disease.
