= Jerry Doyle =

American talk radio host and actor (1956–2016)

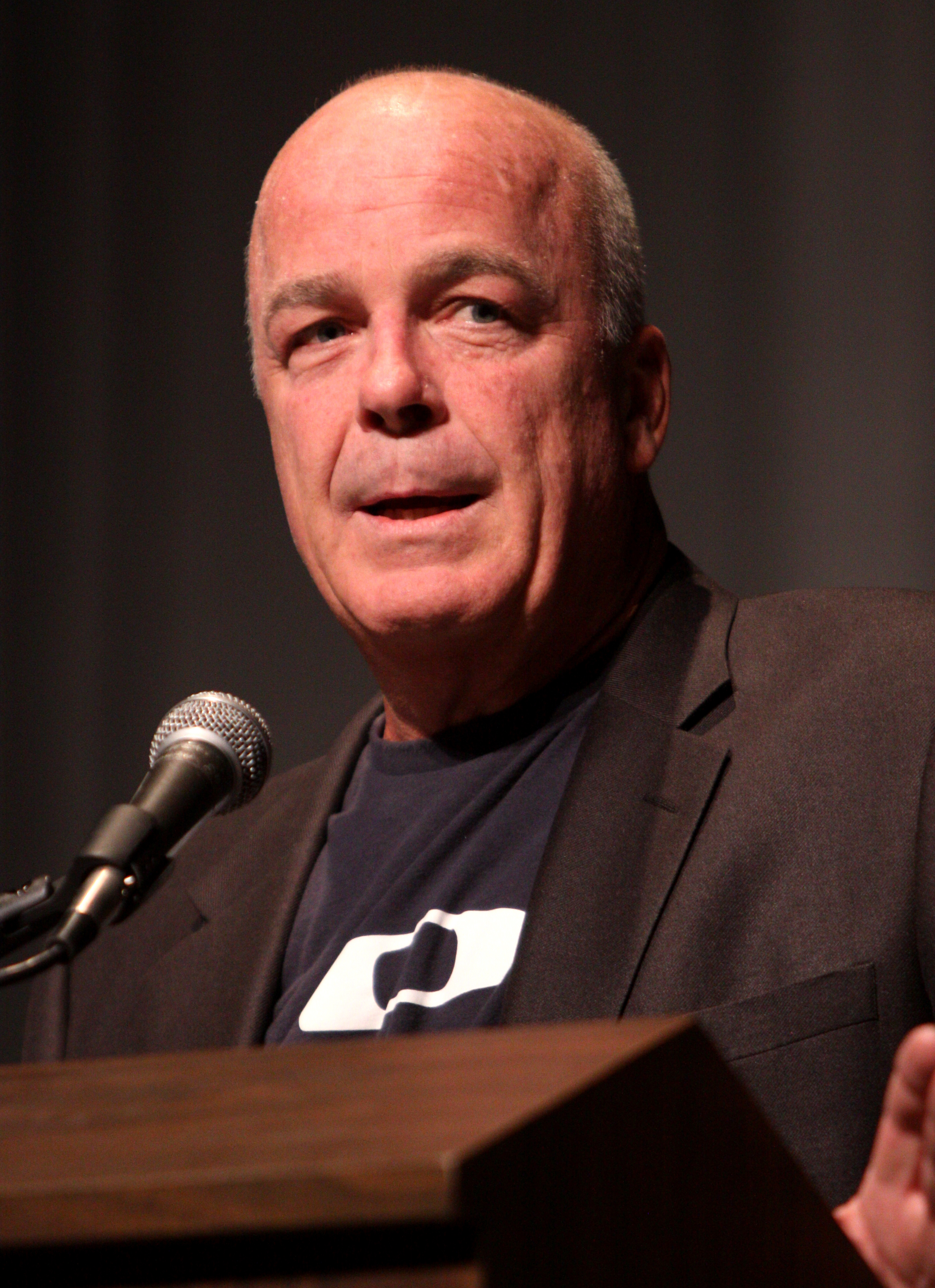
- Jerry Doyle in Reno, Nevada in September 2011
- Born: July 16, 1956; Brooklyn, New York, U.S.
- Died: July 27, 2016 (aged 60); Las Vegas, Nevada, U.S.
- Political party: Republican
- Spouse: Andrea Thompson (m. 1995; div. 1997)
- Children: 1
- Website: http://www.epictimes.com/jerry-doyle/ (archived 2019)

Jerry Doyle (July 16, 1956 – July 27, 2016) was an American talk radio host, political commentator, television actor and founder of the content platform EpicTimes. His nationally syndicated talk show, The Jerry Doyle Show, aired throughout the United States on Talk Radio Network. As an actor, Doyle was best known as security chief Michael Garibaldi in the science fiction series Babylon 5 (1994–1998).

== Early life ==
Doyle graduated from Pope John XXIII Regional High School in Sparta, New Jersey, in 1973, where he played varsity football and basketball. In 1978, Doyle earned a Bachelor of Science Degree in Aeronautics from Embry-Riddle Aeronautical University, while also receiving his flight training. Doyle worked for several years as a corporate jet pilot and then had a career as a stockbroker on Wall Street for a decade.

== Television and radio career ==
Doyle made an abrupt career change into acting in 1991, when he moved to Los Angeles. His first television role was on the series Moonlighting where he played one of several potential replacements for Bruce Willis' character. This was followed by a recurring role as a lawyer on the soap opera The Bold and the Beautiful. Babylon 5 was his first significant starring role, starring as security officer Michael Garibaldi. Doyle quipped that on Babylon 5 he was a "Mick from Brooklyn playing a Wop from Mars."

From 1996 to 1997, Doyle was the voice of the titlular character in the animated cartoon Captain Simian & the Space Monkeys.

He began his own production company to move into production television and independent films, which he described as an "experiment". Other work included a series on the aircraft of the Second World War entitled Keep 'em Flying, alongside producer John Copeland, with whom Doyle had previously worked on Babylon 5. Doyle was a frequent guest on Newsmax Media TV, primarily on the program Midpoint with Ed Berliner. He had also been a featured guest on Fox & Friends.

=== Radio ===
Weekdays from 3 p.m.–6 p.m. PT (6 –9 ET), the Jerry Doyle Show aired on the Talk Radio Network, although the show aired at different times in different markets. It was the sixth most popular talk radio show in the country, with an average of 3.75 million listeners on a weekly basis by early 2012.

Doyle was announced as the replacement program for The Savage Nation in Talk Radio Network's lineup in October 2012. The Savage Nation, at the time the third most-listened-to radio talk show in the United States, abruptly ended its run September 26 when host Michael Savage won a lawsuit against TRN. Doyle replaced Savage on all of Savage's approximately 300 affiliates except for those who chose their own replacement programs. He launched the new media content platform EpicTimes in February 2013, which served as a "one stop shop" for both hard hitting news of the day as well as entertaining "water cooler" type pieces. It was subsequently banned within China.

== Personal life ==
Doyle was married to his Babylon 5 co-star Andrea Thompson from 1995 to 1997. They were married in Cabo San Lucas, in Baja California Sur, in a short ceremony. Doyle remarked that "If the ceremony takes longer than it takes for a margarita to separate, it's too long".

=== Political efforts ===
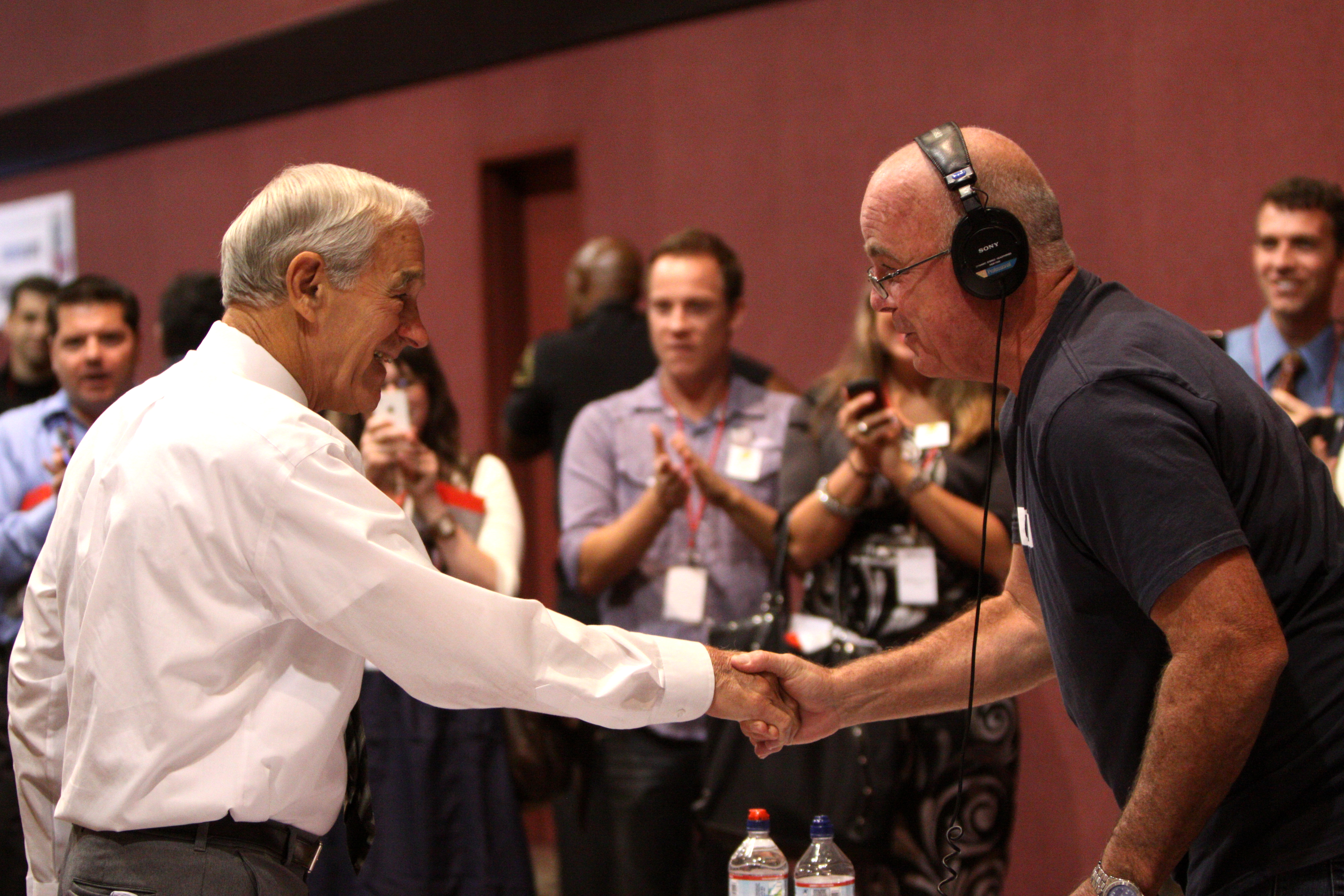
Doyle with Congressman Ron Paul in September 2011

Following his work on Babylon 5, Doyle ran as the Republican Party candidate for California's 24th congressional district in the U.S. House of Representatives in 2000. Doyle won the primary without spending any money on the campaign. However, in the general election on November 7, 2000, he lost to the Democratic incumbent Brad Sherman, with Sherman earning 66% of the vote, compared to Doyle's 30%, the Libertarian candidate's 3%, and the Natural Law candidate's 1%. He received only 43,000 votes. In December 2011, Doyle endorsed Ron Paul for the Presidency of the United States.

=== Death ===
On July 27, 2016, eleven days after his 60th birthday, Doyle was found unresponsive in his Las Vegas home, and declared dead shortly thereafter. The Clark County Coroner's Office later stated that Doyle died from natural causes, with complications from chronic alcoholism being a contributing factor.

His former co-stars offered their condolences, including Bruce Boxleitner, who wrote that he was "so devastated at the news of the untimely death of my good friend". Babylon 5 creator J. Michael Straczynski released a statement:

Regardless of whatever was going on in his life, whether it was marital issues, a broken arm, forced couch-surfing with Bruce and Andreas or other problems, he never once pulled a prima donna on us; he showed up every day on time, knew his lines, and insisted that the guest cast live up to the standards of the main cast.

== Book ==
- Doyle, Jerry (2010). Have You Seen My Country Lately? America's Wake-Up Call. New York: Threshold Editions. ISBN 978-1-4391-6801-1.
