= Paddy Phelan (cricketer) =

English cricketer

Personal information
- Full name: Patrick John Phelan
- Born: 9 February 1938; Chingford, Essex, England
- Died: 7 July 2016 (aged 78)
- Batting: Left-handed
- Role: Bowler

Domestic team information
- Years: Team
- 1958–1965: Essex

Career statistics
Competition	FC	List A
Matches	160	1
Runs scored	1693	4
Batting average	13.22	4.00
100s/50s	0/4	0/0
Top score	63	4
Balls bowled	18628
Wickets	314
Bowling average	28.68
5 wickets in innings	17
10 wickets in match	2
Best bowling	8/109
Catches/stumpings	67/0	1/0
- Source: Cricinfo, 19 July 2013

Paddy Phelan (9 February 1938 – 7 July 2016) was an English cricketer. He played for Essex between 1958 and 1965. Phelan died on 7 July 2016.
