= Mollie Lowery =

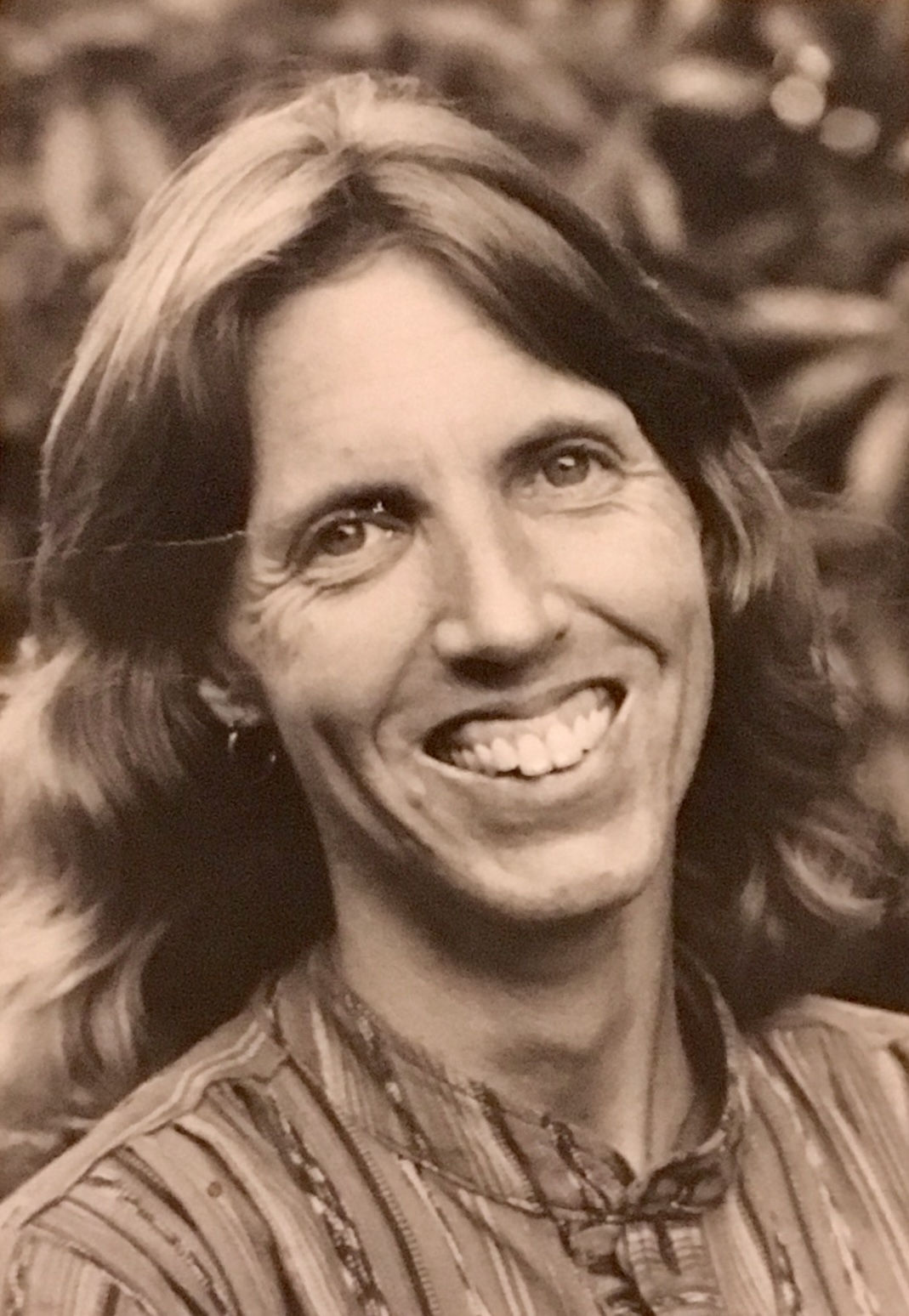
- Born: Mollie Ellen Raddatz; August 2, 1945; Los Angeles, California, U.S.
- Died: July 25, 2016 (aged 70); Los Angeles, California, U.S.
- Education: University of Portland
- Known for: Co-founder of LAMP

Mollie Ellen Lowery (née Raddatz; August 2, 1945 – July 25, 2016) was an American advocate for homeless and mentally ill people in Los Angeles. In 1984, she co-founded the non-profit housing support center, LAMP, and in 2006 she founded an advocacy group, Housing Works.

== Early life ==
Lowery was born Mollie Ellen Raddatz on August 2, 1945, in Van Nuys, Los Angeles. She was educated at Bishop Alemany High School and the University of Portland, where she received a master's degree in rehabilitation counseling.

== Career ==
Lowery's first position was as director of the non-profit organisation Ocean Park Community Center in Santa Monica. While there, she founded the Sojourn Shelter for Battered Women and Their Children, which was one of the first such facilities in the state.

In 1984, wanting to help people who had been moved out of California's mental hospitals, she left Ocean Park and started working with philanthropist Frank Rice. Together they founded the Los Angeles Men's Place, based in Skid Row. The facility initially offered night-time support to homeless and mentally ill people. Rice and Lowery later renamed the center LAMP, and expanded it to provide permanent supportive housing and complementary social services, such as counselling and substance abuse treatment. The foundation also opened a laundromat on Skid Row, employing homeless people as well as providing a service for them, and later a convenience store and a craft shop.

Lowery's approach was groundbreaking in that her organisation offered help to homeless people without preconditions, and considered housing to be the most crucial service to provide to people in need. Unlike other non-profit foundations or government agencies, no paperwork or identification was required, and clients did not need to overcome drug or alcohol addiction before using the shelters and services. This approach became known as "housing first" and Lowery was considered one of its pioneers.

Over the next 20 years Lowery oversaw further development of the center, eventually opening an additional 8 facilities across Los Angeles and employing 80 people. In 2005 she oversaw the construction of a new building, the $1.2 million Frank Rice Safehaven, which houses the organisation's headquarters, a day center and a crisis shelter.

=== Recognition ===
In 2003, Lowery received the Ruth Hollmann Award for Outstanding Contribution to Mental Health from Share! and the Emotional Health Association of California.

In 2016, the California Community Foundation named Lowery one of their 30 Unsung Heroes of Los Angeles County.

== Later life ==
Following her retirement from LAMP in 2005, Lowery moved to a ranch in the rural area of Bishop, California. She regularly took LAMP residents to the ranch for visits, believing that experiencing the outdoors could assist their recovery.

In 2006, Lowery founded an advocacy group, Housing Works, which aimed to assist long-term homeless people into accommodation. She served as the group's director until 2015, and continued in an advisory position until a few weeks before her death. She also held a position with Bring Los Angeles Home, a coalition of cross-sector agencies established in 2006.

Lowery died of cancer on July 25, 2016. She was 70 years old.
