= Uma Shankar Singh =

Uma Shankar Singh may refer to:

- Uma Shankar Singh (Bihar politician) (1940–2013)
- Uma Shankar Singh (Uttar Pradesh politician) (born 1971)
