= Pierre Fauchon =

French politician

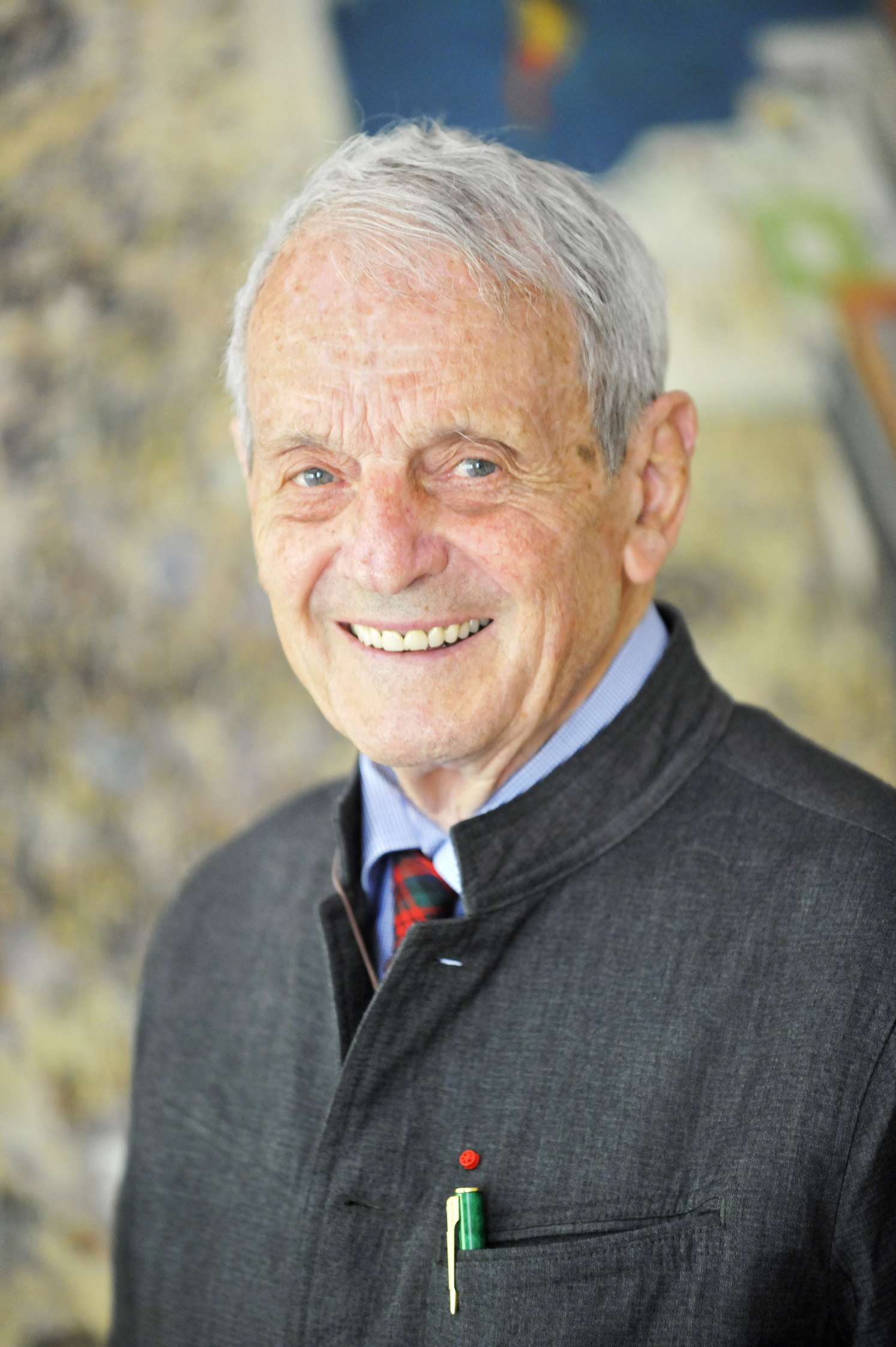
Fauchon in 2012

Pierre Fauchon (13 July 1929 – 25 July 2016) was a French politician. He was a member of the Senate of France from 1992 to 2011. He represented the Loir-et-Cher department and was a member of the Union for French Democracy Party.

Fauchon died on 25 July 2016.
