= Kasam Bapu Tirmizi =

Indian politician

Kasam Bapu Tirmizi was an Indian politician of the Indian National Congress. He was elected twice from the Gandhinagar constituency of the Gujarat Legislative Assembly in 1980 and 1990.
