= Willard Pummel =

American politician

G. Willard Pummel

Member of the South Dakota House of Representatives from the 39th district
- In office 1996–2002

Personal details
- Born: November 25, 1926 Dawson, North Dakota
- Died: July 2, 2016 (aged 89) Belle Fourche, North Dakota
- Party: Republican
- Spouse: Marie

George Willard Pummel (November 25, 1926 - July 2, 2016) was an American politician in the state of South Dakota. He was a member of the South Dakota House of Representatives from 1997 to 2002. A retired banker, Pummel is an alumnus of the University of Colorado and University of South Dakota. He is also a former mayor of Belle Fourche, South Dakota, and Deadwood, South Dakota.
