= Uma Shankar Mishra =

President, District Congress Committee
- Incumbent
- Assumed office 2002 (was in his 4th term)
- Constituency: Raebareli, Uttar Pradesh

Personal details
- Born: c. 1923 Raebareli, Uttar Pradesh
- Died: 4 July 2016 (aged 93)
- Party: Indian National Congress
- Spouse: Late Smt. Rameshwari Mishra

Uma Shankar Mishra (c. 1923 – 4 July 2016) was an Indian Independence Movement activist, politician, and President-District Congress Committee Raebareli. His political party was Indian National Congress.

== Biography ==
=== Early life ===
Mishra has actively participated in National Movement since 1946. He dedicated his life to serve the nation. He started his career as an activist and participated wholeheartedly in the agitations and revolutionary movements along with other freedom fighters.

== Political career ==
=== With Feroze Gandhi ===
Uma Shankar Mishra actively worked with Feroze Gandhi from 1951 to 1960. During the 1st 1951 Indian general election; Feroze Gandhi contested and won the Raebareli constituency. Uma Shankar Mishra closely worked with him during and post election. They were good companions.

=== With Indira Gandhi ===
In 1966, Uma Shankar Mishra along with 5 other representatives met Indira Gandhi at New Delhi to choose to contest Raebareli. Indira Gandhi won the 4th 1967 Indian general election and became Prime Minister of India. She contested Raebareli again in 1971, 1977 and in 1980.

Mishra was a senior leader and prominent figure in the high-profile Congress campaign in Raebareli, wherein he successfully managed her elections and constituency throughout.

In 1980, she contested and won Raebareli and Medak, but then she left the Raebareli seat. Post which, Arun Nehru, Sheila Kaul and Captain Satish Sharma contested and won Raebareli. Uma Shankar Mishra was instrumental in successful victory of Congress party in Raebareli.

He was the Leader of Cooperative movement and revolutionized the Panchayati movement for the district.

He served as Vice President of Zila Parishad, Raebareli for over fifteen years.

=== With Sonia Gandhi ===
During the regime of Captain Satish Sharma, in 2002 Uma Shankar Mishra was elected as the President of District Congress Committee.

In 2004, he invited Sonia Gandhi to contest her mother in law’s constituency Raebareli. Sonia Gandhi contested the 2004 Indian general election and won by a margin of 2.5 Lakh votes. The entire constituency and election was impeccably managed by him.

In the 2006 by-elections, this almost doubled to a victory margin of 4.17 Lakh votes and the vote share also went up to 80 percent. In the 2009 Indian general election, Sonia Gandhi topped the list with a winning margin of 3.72 Lakh votes. He was proven as a mastermind for Indian National Congress in Raebareli.

He was serving his fourth term as President of District Congress Committee.

== See also ==
- Indian National Congress
- Raebareli
