= Lorenzo Amurri =

Italian writer and musician

Lorenzo Amurri (1971 – 12 July 2016) was an Italian writer and musician.

== Biography ==
Amurri was born in Rome in 1971. He turned to writing after a skiing accident that left him a quadriplegic. His short stories appear in a collection titled Amore Caro. His first novel Apnea won the 2015 EU Prize for Literature.

As a musician, Amurri worked with Italian artists such as Tiromancino and Franco Califano.
