= Chen Da (scientist) =

Chinese nuclear scientist (1937–2016)

- 陈达
- Born: 22 March 1937; Nantong County, Jiangsu, China
- Died: 22 July 2016 (aged 79); Nanjing, Jiangsu, China
- Education: Tsinghua University
- Scientific career
- Fields: Nuclear physics

Chen Da (Chinese: 陈达; pinyin: Chén Dá; 22 March 1937 – 22 July 2016) was a Chinese nuclear physicist, educator and academician of the Chinese Academy of Sciences (CAS).

== Biography ==
Chen graduated from Tsinghua University in 1963, majoring in engineering physics. He was assigned work at Northwest Institute of Nuclear Technology for Chinese nuclear program, taking part in the atomic bomb test and hydrogen bomb test. Chen built China's first military level uranium hydrogen zirconium pulsed reactor. He was awarded Major General by the People's Liberation Army for his contribution in 1993 and was elected an academician of the Chinese Academy of Sciences in 2001. Chen retired in 2001 and accepted the invitation to be a professor at Nanjing University of Aeronautics and Astronautics. His research area turned to nuclear technology application project.

Chen died on 22 July 2016 at the age of 79 in Nanjing.
