= Richard Grant Hiskey =

American chemist (1929–2016)

Richard Grant "Dick" Hiskey
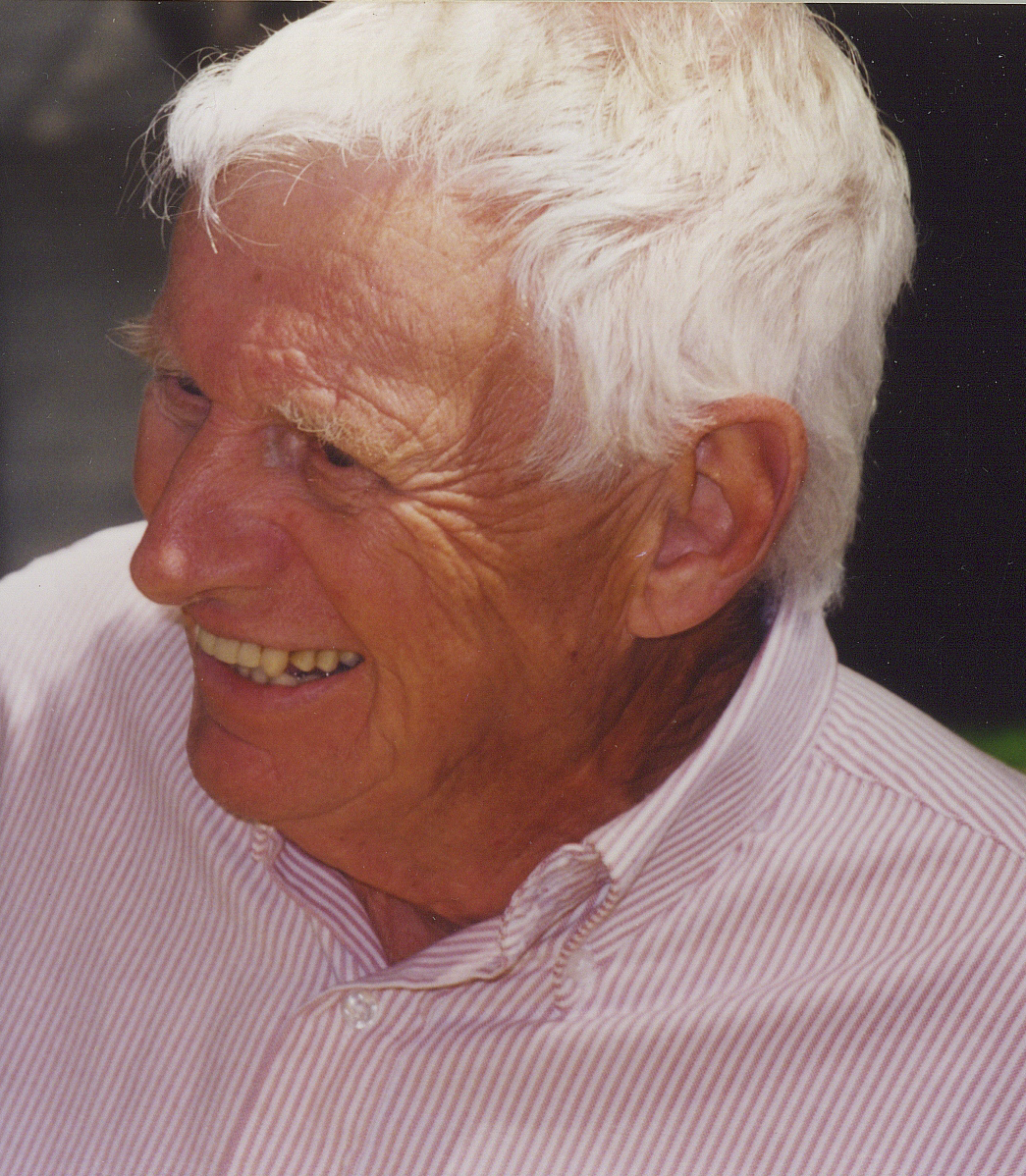
- Born: May 21, 1929; Emporia, Kansas, U.S.
- Died: July 28, 2016 (aged 87)
- Education: Kansas State College; Kansas State University; Wayne State University
- Occupation: Professor
- Known for: Disulfides
- Spouse: Joan T. Crooke (m. 1953)
- Children: 5
- Scientific career
- Fields: Chemistry; Organic chemistry
- Workplaces: University of North Carolina at Chapel Hill

Richard G. Hiskey (May 21, 1929 – July 28, 2016) was an American chemist and Alumni Distinguished Professor of Chemistry at University of North Carolina at Chapel Hill. Hiskey joined the department of chemistry of the University of North Carolina at Chapel Hill in 1958. He served in various capacities within the university, including director of graduate studies (1965-1970) and chairman of the department (1970-1975), (elected) chairman of the division of natural sciences from 1975 to 1981, and faculty representative to the Atlantic Coast Conference and National Association of Intercollegiate Athletics (1985-1995).

== Academic career ==
He received the Standard Oil Foundation for Excellence in Undergraduate Teaching Award in 1970; the Tanner Award for Excellence in Undergraduate Teaching in 1986; and he was elected by students to membership in the Society of the Golden Fleece in 1989. He collaborated with 55 M.S. and Ph.D. colleagues resulting in over 160 referred publications in journals and edited volumes. Following Hiskey's retirement in 1996, the department created the Richard G. Hiskey Graduate Student Fellowship dedicated to the recruitment and retention of outstanding graduate students.

Hiskey received Outstanding Alumnus Awards from Kansas State University in 1973, Wayne State University in 1978, Emporia State University in 1979, and the UNC-CH General Alumni Association Faculty Service Award in 1992. He also was a John Simon Guggenheim Foundation Fellow and a Kenan Research Leave Fellow in 1970–71 at the Max Planck Institute for Cell Chemistry.

Hiskey's initial research concerned the development of methods for the production of "mixed sulfides" and the features which stabilized or destabilized these molecules. Mixed disulfides occur in the folding and stabilization of proteins via cystine-cystine interactions. Pursuit of the synthesis of insulin led to the development of methods for the production of mixed disulfides containing two or more cystine residues differently S-protected.

The second major phase of Hiskey's research program concerned the role of protein-bound X-Carboxyglutamic (GLA) residues in blood clot formation. He developed a method for chemical modification of the GLA residues in 1982 and studied it using various metal ims and prothrombin fragments binding to phospholipid surfaces. These studies were recognized in Hiskey's National Heart, Lung and Blood Institute's Merit Award for the period 1986 to 1996.

The study was extended to include various models containing tris-phosphates and peptides containing several GLA residues. Hiskey's interest in peptide synthesis resulted in membership on the Organization Committee of the American Peptide Symposium from 1978 to 1983, as well as from 1988 to 1990, and co-chairman of the 1982 Gordon Research Conference on the Chemistry and Biology of Peptides. Hiskey also received and accepted an invitation to visit Japan as a Japan Society for the Promotion of Science Fellow as a result of his work on peptide synthesis. Finally, the American Peptide Society presented Hiskey with the Society's Annual Award in June 1996. In that same year, Hiskey retired from the University of North Carolina as Alumni Distinguished Professor Emeritus.

== Honors ==
- John Simmon Guggenheim Foundation Fellow, 1970–71
- Standard Oil Foundation Award for Excellence in Undergraduate Teaching, 1970
- Kenan Research Leave, University of North Carolina, 1970–71
- Outstanding Alumnus Award, department of chemistry, Kansas State University, 1973
- Distinguished Alumnus Award, Wayne State University, 1978
- Distinguished Alumnus Award, Emporia State University, 1979
- Co-chairman, 1982 Gordon Res. Conf. on Chem/Biol. of Peptides
- Japan Society for Promotion of Science Fellow, 1983
- Elected Fellow, American Association for the Advancement of Science, 1983
- Tanner Award for Excellence in Undergraduate Teaching, 1986.
- Merit Award, National Heart, Lung, and Blood Institute, National Institute of Health, 1986.
- National Heart, Lung, and Blood Institute Merit Award recipient, 1986-
- Society of the Golden Fleece, University of North Carolina, 1989.
- Faculty Service Award, Alumni Association, 1992.
- Vincent du Vigneaud Award of the American Peptide Society, 1996.
