= Joe A. McClain =

American politician

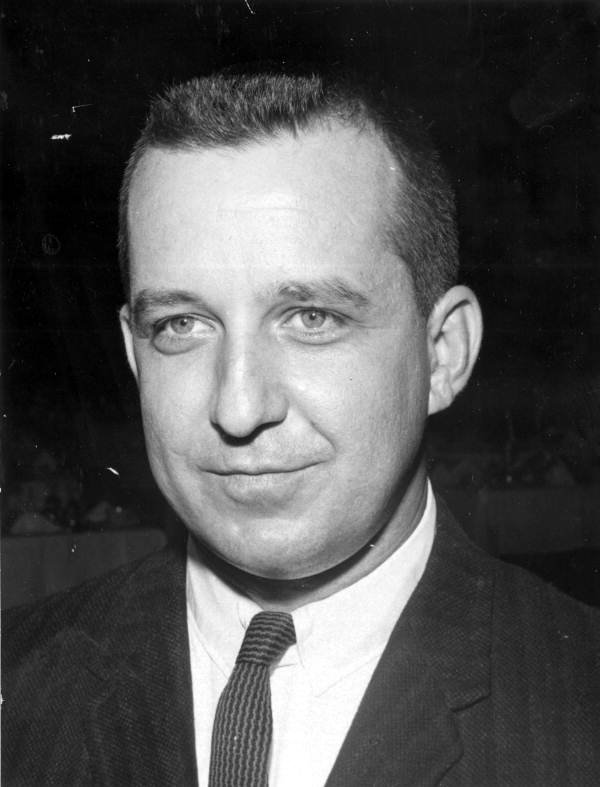
- McClain in 1961

Member of the Florida House of Representatives from Pasco County
- In office 1958–1962

Personal details
- Born: July 16, 1928 Etowah, Tennessee, U.S.
- Died: July 30, 2016 (aged 88)
- Party: Democratic
- Spouse: Jo Claire Edwards
- Children: 6
- Education: Stetson University; Stetson University College of Law

Joe A. McClain (July 16, 1928 – July 30, 2016) was an American politician. He served as a Democratic member of the Florida House of Representatives.

== Life and career ==
McClain was born in Etowah, Tennessee, the son of Ella and Joe H. McClain. He served in the United States Army Air Corps for two years. He attended Stetson University and Stetson University College of Law.

In 1958, McClain was elected to the Florida House of Representatives, serving until 1962. He was an assistant state attorney for seven years, serving under James Russell. He was also a general counsel of the school board of Pasco County, Florida for 30 years.

McClain died in July 2016, at the age of 88.
