= Jack Meadows (astronomer) =

British astronomer, information scientist and professor (1934–2016)

Arthur Jack Meadows (24 January 1934 – 18 July 2016) was a British astronomer and information scientist. Known for founding the astronomy department of University of Leicester.

He had a wide-ranging career, including working at the British Museum and as a professor of library and information studies. He published extensively (30 books and over 250 journal articles).

== Books (selected) ==
- Communication in Science
- Communicating Research

== Honors ==
- A minor planet, Asteroid 4600 Meadows is named after him.
- Fulbright scholar, 1959-1961
