= 2013–14 Bolton Wanderers F.C. season =

Bolton Wanderers
2013–14 season
- Chairman: Phil Gartside
- Manager: Dougie Freedman
- Stadium: Reebok Stadium
- Championship: 14th
- FA Cup: 4th Round
- League Cup: 2nd Round
- Top goalscorer: League: Jermaine Beckford (7); Lukas Jutkiewicz (7); André Moritz (7); All: Jermaine Beckford (9)
- Highest home attendance: 19,622 (v Leeds United, 14 September 2013)
- Lowest home attendance: 11,180 (v Blackpool, 4 January 2014)
- Average home league attendance: 16,141
Home colours	Away colours

The 2013–14 season was Bolton Wanderers' second consecutive season in the Football League Championship following their relegation from the Premier League in 2012.

It covered the period from 1 July 2013 to 30 June 2014.

== Pre-season ==
On 29 May, the club announced a new shirt sponsorship deal with pay day loan company QuickQuid, replacing 188BET who sponsored the club's shirts for the previous two seasons. The deal sparked protests from fans and local politicians alike, with a petition asking the club to rethink the decision reaching over a thousand signatures within just over twenty four hours. Bolton South East MP, Yasmin Qureshi, called the deal "completely wrong" and joined fellow local MPs David Crausby and Julie Hilling, alongside Bolton Council leader Cliff Morris and Bolton at Home chief executive Jon Lord in calling upon the club to reconsider the decision.

Two days later, on 31 May, it was confirmed that former captain Kevin Davies would be given a testimonial, and that the decision had been ratified by the Football League.

On 5 June 2013, Bolton announced that they would no longer be entering into a sponsorship agreement with QuickQuid due to "the adverse reaction to the sector of business in which the sponsor operated". In the same announcement, Bolton announced that their new shirt sponsor would be FibrLec, who work with the town's university. FibrLec are a new Bolton-based sustainable energy company that specialise in commercialising the university's innovative smart materials.

On 17 May 2013, Bolton announced a total of eight pre-season fixtures split between the first team and a Bolton XI. After travelling to the south of Spain for a week-long training camp on 7 July 2013, Bolton returned to play against Rotherham United, a game they lost 2–1 despite taking the lead through Marvin Sordell. They next played Shrewsbury Town, to whom Tom Eaves was on loan towards the end of the 2012–13 season. The game ended in a 3–3 draw, with a Sordell brace and a goal from Chris Eagles. The penultimate game was at Carlisle United where Bolton lost 1–0 after an early goal. Bolton announced their home pre-season friendly on 3 June 2013, facing Real Betis on 26 July at the Reebok Stadium. Bolton lost their final pre-season friendly 2–0 courtesy of goals from Jorge Molina and Joan Verdú either side of half-time.

A Bolton XI played against Skelmersdale United, winning 1–0 through a Josh Vela penalty. The development squad also played against Chorley for the Harold Taylor Memorial Trophy. Bolton won 2–1 with goals from new signing Gary Fraser and Tom Youngs. This was followed by a match against F.C. United of Manchester at Bury's Gigg Lane. The game ended in a 1–1 draw with Conor Wilkinson grabbing Bolton's goal. The development squad's next game of pre-season came away at Chester. With first team players such as Craig Davies, Tyrone Mears and Matt Mills featuring, Bolton could only secure a stalemate at the Exacta Stadium. The squad's penultimate pre-season game finished with a win for the Whites as a Tom Eaves in the second half settled the affair. The Bolton XI finished their pre-season preparations with a win over Stockport County at Edgeley Park.

At a fans' forum held at the Reebok Stadium on 29 July, manager Dougie Freedman confirmed that Zat Knight had been made team captain for the forthcoming season. On the same day, the club website confirmed that Stuart Holden had torn his anterior cruciate ligament in his right leg while playing for the United States in the CONCACAF Gold Cup final against Panama. This also meant that Holden was the third Bolton player to suffer an ACL injury in 2013, alongside Mark Davies and Joe Riley.

16 July 2013	Rotherham United	2–1	Bolton Wanderers	New York Stadium
19:45 BST	Revell 63'; Nardiello 87'	Report	Sordell 42'	Attendance: 2,470; Referee: Mark Heywood

20 July 2013	Shrewsbury Town	3–3	Bolton Wanderers	Greenhous Meadow
15:00 BST	Marsden 32'; Parry 66'; Asante 78'	Report	Sordell 20', 44'; Eagles 35'	Attendance: 1,422; Referee: Phil Gibbs

23 July 2013	Carlisle United	1–0	Bolton Wanderers	Brunton Park
19:45 BST	Miller 14'	Report		Attendance: 1,691; Referee: Seb Stockbridge

26 July 2013	Bolton Wanderers	0–2	Real Betis	Reebok Stadium
20:00 BST		Report	Molina 31'; Verdú 74'	Attendance: 4,070; Referee: Phil Dowd

=== Reserves ===
17 July 2013	Skelmersdale United	0–1	Bolton XI	West Lancashire College Stadium
19:45 BST		Report	Vela 50' (pen.)

19 July 2013	Chorley	1–2	Bolton XI	Victory Park
19:45 BST	O'Brien 54'	Report	Fraser 10'; Youngs 80'	Attendance: 621

24 July 2013	F.C. United of Manchester	1–1	Bolton XI	Gigg Lane
19:45 BST	Walwyn 52'	Report	Wilkinson 19'

27 July 2013	Chester	0–0	Bolton XI	Exacta Stadium
15:00 BST		Report		Attendance: 890; Referee: Darren Handley

30 July 2013	Macclesfield Town	0–1	Bolton XI	Moss Rose
19:45 BST		Report	Eaves 62'	Attendance: 564

5 August 2013	Stockport County	1–2	Bolton XI	Edgeley Park
11:45 BST	Dennis 19'	Report	Wilkinson 15'; Lester 40'

== Championship ==
The fixtures for the 2013-14 Football League Championship season were released on 19 June 2013. However, on 18 June the Football League announced six opening day fixtures, all involving the eight founder members who are currently playing in the Football League, as part of the league's 125th anniversary celebrations.

They will finish the season at the Reebok Stadium, playing Birmingham City on 3 May 2014.

=== August ===
For the second consecutive season, Bolton visited fellow founder members Burnley at Turf Moor on the opening day of the season. After falling behind to a Danny Ings shot that deflected off David Wheater in the 26th minute, the goal eventually being given to Ings by the Football League, Bolton equalised through Darren Pratley in the 37th minute. No further goals were scored to give Bolton a draw in their first match of the season. Bolton's first home game of the season was against relegated Reading. Darren Pratley got his second goal in as many league games to put Bolton in the lead, but Reading equalised through a Nick Blackman penalty early in the second half. On 17 August Bolton travelled to the City Ground to face Billy Davies' Nottingham Forest. Bolton conceded after two minutes to a Jamie Mackie goal, which was followed by two further goals in the second half for Nottingham Forest to hand Bolton their first defeat of the season, with Darren Pratley being sent off during the match. Bolton's second home game of the season came against QPR, who had been relegated from the Premier League the previous season. The game was preceded by the unveiling of a statue of Nat Lofthouse outside the Reebok Stadium. After a goalless first half, QPR edged ahead through Andy Johnson in the 54th minute. This was Bolton's first home loss in 2013, ending a 12-game unbeaten home run, and left them without a win in the new season. Bolton's winless run continued against local rivals Blackburn Rovers at Ewood Park, where they fell to a 4–1 loss. This left Bolton at the foot of the table going into September.

=== September ===
At home to Leeds United, Bolton conceded to an early Luke Varney goal from a corner and failed to respond; with Bolton registering only one shot on target throughout the match. The loss, Bolton's fourth in a row, left them winless in the new season, though they moved off the foot of the table courtesy of Millwall's poorer goal difference. Despite halting their four-game losing run with a 2–2 draw in their next game against Derby County, Bolton slipped to the bottom of the table again as Millwall beat Blackpool. Defender Alex Baptiste scored his second goal of the season to put Bolton ahead on five minutes before Johnny Russell scored two to put Derby in front. Chris Eagles equalised after forty minutes to earn Bolton the point. In their eighth match, Bolton faced Brighton & Hove Albion at Falmer Stadium. After taking the lead through a Lee Chung-Yong cross that deflected off David López, Bolton went in at half-time a goal to the good. However, after conceding three goals in four minutes in the second half, Bolton left Brighton with no points. In their final game of September, Bolton faced the Glovers, Yeovil Town. Yeovil took the lead after 'keeper Ádám Bogdán spilled an Ed Upson shot before Alex Baptiste headed in his third goal of the season in the 90th minute to equalise and push Bolton off the foot of the table, with Barnsley dropping below them.

=== October ===
Aiming to finally get their first win of the season, Bolton kicked off at Blackpool's Bloomfield Road. Striker Jermaine Beckford hit the woodwork, while Kevin McNaughton and Neil Danns made their debuts and Liam Feeney earned his first start, but Bolton could not break the deadlock and the game finished 0–0, giving Bolton just their third clean sheet away from home since their win against QPR on the opening day of the 2011–12 season and ending Blackpool's season-long run of scoring in every match. After naming an unchanged side for the game against Birmingham City, Bolton took the lead with Jermaine Beckford's first league goal of the season before loanee Neil Danns scored against his former club to double the lead. Bolton were pegged back by substitute Nikola Žigić's header which looped over Ádám Bogdán, but held on to earn their first win of the season. Žigić's goal was later credited to Lee Novak. After the international break, Bolton played host to Sheffield Wednesday, the only team in the league without a win. Jermaine Beckford followed up his goal in the previous game by opening the scoring but Alex Baptiste put through his own net for Wednesday to equalise. In the last five minutes, Wednesday's José Semedo was sent off for a tackle on Jay Spearing but Bolton were unable to capitalise on the advantage as the match ended 1–1. The following match took place against Ipswich Town, with Bolton looking to win at home for the first time. After taking the lead through a free-kick taken by Medo Kamara, David McGoldrick equalised for Ipswich, leaving Bolton five games unbeaten but just one place above the relegation zone.

=== November ===
Bolton first game of November came against Bournemouth at the Goldsands Stadium. Late in the first half, David Ngog rounded Bournemouth 'keeper Lee Camp to open the scoring. Bolton held out for the second half until Jermaine Beckford scored his fourth goal of the season in the 90th minute to seal the win which left Bolton with a six-match unbeaten run with four draws and two wins. Bolton's next game against Millwall extended that run with their first home win of the season as Robert Hall, Jermaine Beckford and André Moritz all scored past David Forde in a 3–1 victory. Extending their unbeaten run to eight matches and earning their third consecutive away win, Bolton edged past Watford at Vicarage Road in their next match. When Manuel Almunia dropped a Neil Danns cross, Jermaine Beckford was there to score his fifth goal in six games and give Bolton the three points. On the final day of November, Bolton travelled to the Riverside Stadium to face Middlesbrough for new manager Aitor Karanka's first home game for Boro. The match was decided by two penalties; Grant Leadbitter scoring his after Tim Ream fouled Marvin Emnes in the box, before substitute André Moritz won a penalty only for Jermaine Beckford to miss. This 1–0 loss ended Bolton's eight-match unbeaten run.

=== December ===
Back at the Reebok Stadium against Huddersfield Town after an international break and two away matches, Bolton failed to capitalise on their previous home win against Millwall, falling to Oliver Norwood's second strike in two games, beating Andy Lonergan from 30 yards. In an attempt to bounce back from the two consecutive defeats, Dougie Freedman made five changes from the team that fell at home to Huddersfield Town. André Moritz, who retained his place from the previous game, set up Joe Mason to score on his full debut before scoring himself from long range. Neil Danns wrapped things up in second half stoppage time to push Bolton back up to 15th place. Bolton faced Wigan on 15 December at the DW Stadium. As ex-Bolton manager Owen Coyle had been sacked by Wigan in the week preceding the match, new manager Uwe Röslerr was looking to win in his first home game. Wigan were 2–0 up at half-time. They opened the scoring when Matt Mills was adjudged to have handled the ball in the box and Ben Watson subsequently dispatched the resulting penalty, before on-loan Nick Powell scored on 25 minutes. Bolton levelled 20 minutes after the break, their first goal coming four minutes after the restart, Neil Danns scoring his third goal for the club and the second came when Lee Chung-Yong was kicked in the penalty area, giving André Moritz the chance to put away the spot-kick for his third. However, just four minutes later, Wigan restored their lead through Callum McManaman to send Bolton home with no points. Bolton entered Christmas in 18th place thanks to a 1–1 draw with Charlton Athletic at the Reebok Stadium. They fell behind to a goal from Yann Kermorgant before equalising with Kevin McNaughton's first goal since 2008. Bolton won against Barnsley on Boxing Day, with Neil Danns scoring in the last game of his loan spell, as he was unable to play against Leicester City, his parent club, that weekend. Bolton's final game of the year was a thrilling affair with eight goals being shared between the two sides. Bolton finished on the wrong end of the scoreline; with Leicester winning 5–3. Leicester took the lead through former United player Danny Drinkwater before goals from André Moritz and Jermaine Beckford turned the tie in Bolton's favour. Leicester equalised when Anthony Knockaert scored but Moritz scored his second just a few minutes later. Leicester equalised a second time when Tim Ream deflected into his own net just before half-time. Leicester scored two more in the second half; Lloyd Dyer and Gary Taylor-Fletcher earning the three points for Leicester.

=== January ===
In their first home game of the new year, Bolton went 2–0 down in the first twenty minutes of the game against Middlesbrough. With nine minutes gone, Zat Knight lost the ball on the edge of the box, allowing Mustapha Carayol to play in. Following this, an error in communication between Knight and Andy Lonergan resulted in an over-hit backpass which let Curtis Main steal in to bag Middlesbrough's second. Alex Baptiste then scored his fourth goal of the season before half-time, and David Ngog scored in the final minute of normal time to rescue the point for Bolton. In their next game, Bolton were thoroughly beaten by Reading at the Madejski Stadium. Adam Le Fondre scored a first half hat-trick within 33 minutes, before Pavel Pogrebnyak added a fourth after Alex Baptiste handled in the box to concede a penalty. The half-time scoreline was then nearly doubled; Kaspars Gorkšs, Hope Akpan and Nick Blackman making it seven. Sanmi Odelusi assisted David Ngog's consolation goal, with two minutes remaining in the game. Bolton lost for the third time running in all competitions, going down 2–1 to QPR at Loftus Road, Jay Spearing scoring his first of the season via a deflection in the last ten minutes.

=== February ===
Bolton began the new month with another loss; to Ipswich Town at Portman Road. Andy Lonergan brought down David McGoldrick to concede a penalty which the striker also scored. Beginning a run of four home games in the next five, Bolton faced Bournemouth at home. Bolton obtained a two-goal lead in the first half-an-hour through Lee Chung-Yong's first of the season and Lukas Jutkiewicz's first for the club. However, Bournemouth replied almost immediately through Lewis Grabban before equalising from a corner; Simon Francis scoring the goal. Facing local rivals Burnley, also at home, Bolton fell to a second half goal from Sam Vokes. Following the game, Burnley manager Sean Dyche claimed that Bolton's match-day programme had partly inspired the win, saying, "I just took a few of the quotes and went up to a couple of them (Burnley players) and went 'apparently we're having a tough time'." They faced Millwall after this, at The Den. Despite taking the lead through Lukas Jutkiewicz in the 15th minute, as well as hitting the post from a Chris Eagles free-kick and missing a penalty which Jutkiewicz took, Bolton only returned with a point as Martyn Woolford equalised from a tight angle. Bolton started with two strikers in their next game against Watford, following Joe Mason's return to the club on loan. His strike partner Lukas Jutkiewicz scored his third goal in six games for the club before Mason scored on his second debut for the club, as he did against Doncaster earlier in the season. Bolton drew the second half to earn their third home win of the season.

=== March ===
Bolton made it two wins on the run in their first match of the new month, against local rivals Blackburn, who had beaten them 4–0 earlier in the season. Bolton made amends; winning 4–0 with two goals in either half. Medo Kamara opened the scoring with a placed header, having been set up by Neil Danns' cross before Joe Mason doubled the lead with his second strike in as many games shortly before half-time. Jay Spearing furthered the lead two minutes after the break; his long-range shot bouncing off the crossbar and over the line, leaving substitute André Moritz to finish the scoring with a low, powerful shot to Paul Robinson's right which the former England 'keeper couldn't keep out.

In news off the field, Stuart Holden was again injured after returning to playing duties in an U-21 match against Everton, against whom he completed only 23 minutes. On the Tuesday of the following week, it was announced that he would be out of the game again for between six and nine months following another operation on his knee.

It was three wins on the bounce for Wanderers, as they comprehensively won at Leeds United's Elland Road. Joe Mason scored his third in as many games and his third consecutive goal on 45 minutes as Bolton went into half-time 1–0 up. Jutkiewicz added a second; heading in a Jay Spearing free-kick and Zat Knight scored his first goal since 2010 just four minutes later. Mark Davies and André Moritz both added to the scoreline before Leeds' Matt Smith finished the scoring with a consolation goal. Bolton could not further their recent scoring record of 11 goals in three games, but kept a third clean sheet in four games away to Derby County; a game in which loanee Alan Hutton made his debut for the club. Against Brighton on 15 March, Neil Danns and Mark Davies made way for Lee Chung-Yong and Liam Trotter in midfield. A Will Buckley brace – one goal in each half – awarded the points to Brighton. For their next game, Bolton travelled to Somerset to face Yeovil Town at Huish Park. Bolton were two goals down at half-time thanks to goals from former Manchester City player Ishmael Miller and Kevin Dawson. However, Bolton retained their unbeaten status against Yeovil as a long-range effort from Lukas Jutkiewicz and a looping Zat Knight header – his second goal in three games – which went over the head of the stranded Marek Štěch completed the comeback for 10-man Whites, who had Alex Baptiste sent off after conceding a penalty which Miller squandered with Yeovil 2–1 up at the time; hitting the outside of the post. Against Blackpool at the Reebok in a midweek fixture, Bolton went into the lead early in the second half, with David Wheater heading in a Jay Spearing corner. Bolton held on for a clean sheet and three points, leaving them with only one loss in their last eight games. The next game at the Reebok Stadium came that weekend; another local derby this time against Wigan Athletic. Bolton took the lead when Lukas Jutkiewicz got a toe on Robert Hall's free-kick on 31 minutes and went into half-time with the lead still intact. Substitutions changed the game, however; Uwe Rösler brought on Manchester United loanee Nick Powell while Dougie Freedman brought on Alex Baptiste – back from a one-game suspension following his red card against Yeovil Town – in an unfamiliar holding midfield position while also shifting Medo Kamara to the wing. Powell proceeded to score on the 88th minute, firing home from Martyn Waghorn's cross, while Baptiste conceded a second penalty in two games, forcing Ádám Bogdán to rescue the point for Bolton; saving Jordi Gómez's spot-kick high to his right.

=== April ===
Bolton travelled to the John Smith's Stadium to face Huddersfield Town in their first game of April. Both teams hit the woodwork in the first half via Danny Ward and Lee Chung-Yong for Huddersfield and Bolton, respectively, though the game looked as if it were headed for a scoreless draw until substitute Joe Mason scored in the second minute of injury time to push Bolton up to 15th in the table. Remaining in Yorkshire for another away match, Bolton faced Doncaster Rovers at the Keepmoat Stadium on 8 April. Going two goals to the good in the first quarter of an hour, Doncaster halved the deficit when Wales midfielder David Cotterill put in a free-kick off the crossbar. No more goals were scored, leaving Bolton with two wins on the bounce and a six-match unbeaten away run. Bolton continued their winning streak against Barnsley; Jermaine Beckford rounding the 'keeper after getting on the end of a Matt Mills long ball on the stroke of half-time. Bolton couldn't continue their winning run in London; instead playing their part in a stalemate against Charlton Athletic at the Valley. It did, however, continue Bolton's seven game unbeaten away streak. On 22 April, Leicester City won the Football League Championship at the Reebok Stadium; winning 1–0 – a Lloyd Dyer strike giving them the result they needed. The score also ended Bolton's unbeaten run as they remained in 14th place. Away at Hillsborough on 26 April, Bolton raced into a three-goal lead courtesy of goals from Neil Danns, Lee Chung-Yong and Liam Trotter's first for the club. Joe Mattock reduced the deficit for the home side but no further goals were scored to give Bolton their longest unbeaten away run since 2001; going eight games unbeaten.

=== May ===
Bolton's final game of the season was also their last at the Reebok Stadium before it was to be renamed as the Macron Stadium from next season. Their opponents were Birmingham City, who required a point from the game to stay in the Championship as Doncaster Rovers would lose to champions Leicester City. Goalless at half-time, Bolton went 2–0 up with Lee Chung-Yong and Lukas Jutkiewicz. Nikola Žigić halved the deficit before Paul Caddis rescued the point three minutes into injury time to keep Birmingham up.

3 August 2013	Burnley	1–1	Bolton Wanderers	Turf Moor
12:15 BST	Ings 26'	Report	Pratley 37'	Attendance: 12,919; Referee: Mark Clattenburg

10 August 2013	Bolton Wanderers	1–1	Reading	Reebok Stadium
15:00 BST	Pratley 14'	Report	Blackman 51' (pen.)	Attendance: 15,551; Referee: Carl Boyeson

17 August 2013	Nottingham Forest	3–0	Bolton Wanderers	City Ground
15:00 BST	Mackie 2'; Reid 50'; Lansbury 65'	Report	Pratley (red card) 53'	Attendance: 22,306; Referee: Mark Haywood

24 August 2013	Bolton Wanderers	0–1	QPR	Reebok Stadium
12:15 BST		Report	Johnson 54'	Attendance: 14,999; Referee: James Adcock

31 August 2013	Blackburn Rovers	4–1	Bolton Wanderers	Ewood Park
15:00 BST	Dunn 27'; Rhodes 28', 83'; Evans 70'	Report	Baptiste 45'	Attendance: 15,882; Referee: Keith Stroud

14 September 2013	Bolton Wanderers	0–1	Leeds United	Reebok Stadium
15:00 BST		Report	Varney 6'	Attendance: 19,622; Referee: Andy D'Urso

17 September 2013	Bolton Wanderers	2–2	Derby County	Reebok Stadium
20:00 BST	Baptiste 5'; Eagles 41'	Report	Russell 7', 18'	Attendance: 14,260; Referee: Scott Mathieson

21 September 2013	Brighton	3–1	Bolton Wanderers	Falmer Stadium
15:00 BST	Spearing 53' (o.g.); Calderón 55'; Buckley 57'	Report	López 29' (o.g.)	Attendance: 26,319; Referee: Mike Jones

28 September 2013	Bolton Wanderers	1–1	Yeovil Town	Reebok Stadium
15:00 BST	Baptiste 90'	Report	Upson 79'	Attendance: 14,716; Referee: Tony Harrington

1 October 2013	Blackpool	0–0	Bolton Wanderers	Bloomfield Road
20:00 BST		Report		Attendance: 13,819; Referee: Neil Swarbrick

6 October 2013	Birmingham City	1–2	Bolton Wanderers	St. Andrew's
12:15 BST	Novak 69'	Report	Beckford 12'; Danns 64'	Attendance: 13,627; Referee: David Coote

19 October 2013	Bolton Wanderers	1–1	Sheffield Wednesday	Reebok Stadium
15:00 BST	Beckford 16'	Report	Baptiste 26' (o.g.)	Attendance: 17,177; Referee: Chris Foy

26 October 2013	Bolton Wanderers	1–1	Ipswich Town	Reebok Stadium
15:00 BST	Medo 65'	Report	McGoldrick 73'	Attendance: 15,222; Referee: David Webb

2 November 2013	Bournemouth	0–2	Bolton Wanderers	Goldsands Stadium
15:00 GMT		Report	Ngog 37'; Beckford 90'	Attendance: 10,015; Referee: Darren Deadman

9 November 2013	Bolton Wanderers	3–1	Millwall	Reebok Stadium
15:00 GMT	Hall 5'; Beckford 43'; Moritz 89'	Report	Easter 28'	Attendance: 14,830; Referee: Graham Scott

23 November 2013	Watford	0–1	Bolton Wanderers	Vicarage Road
15:00 GMT		Report	Beckford 27'	Attendance: 15,247; Referee: Brendan Malone

30 November 2013	Middlesbrough	1–0	Bolton Wanderers	Riverside Stadium
15:00 GMT	Leadbitter 82' (pen.)	Report		Attendance: 23,679; Referee: Mark Brown

3 December 2013	Bolton Wanderers	0–1	Huddersfield Town	Reebok Stadium
20:00 GMT		Report	Norwood 71'	Attendance: 15,452; Referee: Geoff Eltringham

7 December 2013	Bolton Wanderers	3–0	Doncaster Rovers	Reebok Stadium
15:00 GMT	Mason 33'; Moritz 39'; Danns 90'	Report		Attendance: 15,471; Referee: Richard Clark

15 December 2013	Wigan Athletic	3–2	Bolton Wanderers	DW Stadium
15:00 GMT	Watson 11' (pen.); Powell 25'; McManaman 68'	Report	Danns 49'; Moritz 64' (pen.)	Attendance: 19,226; Referee: Kevin Friend

21 December 2013	Bolton Wanderers	1–1	Charlton Athletic	Reebok Stadium
15:00 GMT	McNaughton 45'	Report	Kermorgant 11'	Attendance: 14,923; Referee: Phil Gibbs

26 December 2013	Barnsley	0–1	Bolton Wanderers	Oakwell
15:00 GMT		Report	Danns 64'	Attendance: 12,484; Referee: Andy Haines

29 December 2013	Leicester City	5–3	Bolton Wanderers	King Power Stadium
15:00 GMT	Drinkwater 5'; Knockaert 37'; Mills 41' (o.g.); Dyer 75'; Taylor-Fletcher 89'	Report	Moritz 14', 39'; Beckford 20'	Attendance: 26,614; Referee: Mike Russell

1 January 2014	Bolton Wanderers	2–2	Middlesbrough	Reebok Stadium
15:00 GMT	Baptiste 29'; Ngog 90'	Report	Carayol 9'; Main 20'	Attendance: 17,410; Referee: Chris Sarginson

11 January 2014	Bolton Wanderers	1–1	Nottingham Forest	Reebok Stadium
15:00 GMT	Mills 75'	Report	Paterson 47'	Attendance: 17,046; Referee: Michael Naylor

18 January 2014	Reading	7–1	Bolton Wanderers	Madejski Stadium
15:00 GMT	Le Fondre 12', 28', 33'; Pogrebnyak 41' (pen.); Gorkšs 60'; Akpan 74'; Blackman 78'	Report	Ngog 88'	Attendance: 18,629; Referee: Andy Davies

28 January 2014	QPR	2–1	Bolton Wanderers	Loftus Road
19:45 GMT	Austin 41'; Henry 50'	Report	Spearing 85'	Attendance: 15,097; Referee: Andy D'Urso

1 February 2014	Ipswich Town	1–0	Bolton Wanderers	Portman Road
15:00 GMT	McGoldrick 55' (pen.)	Report		Attendance: 15,429; Referee: Charles Breakspear

8 February 2014	Bolton Wanderers	2–2	Bournemouth	Reebok Stadium
15:00 GMT	C.Y. Lee 21'; Jutkiewicz 32'	Report	Grabban 34'; Francis 66'	Attendance: 14,336; Referee: Andy Madley

11 February 2014	Bolton Wanderers	0–1	Burnley	Reebok Stadium
20:00 GMT	Wheater (yellow card) 5'	Report	Shackell (yellow card) 38'; Vokes 58'	Attendance: 16,439; Referee: Graham Salisbury

15 February 2014	Millwall	1–1	Bolton Wanderers	The Den
15:00 GMT	Woolford 82'	Report	Jutkiewicz 15'	Attendance: 10,007; Referee: Simon Hooper

22 February 2014	Bolton Wanderers	2–0	Watford	Reebok Stadium
15:00 GMT	Jutkiewicz 35'; Mason 45'	Report		Attendance: 15,179; Referee: Fred Graham

1 March 2014	Bolton Wanderers	4–0	Blackburn Rovers	Reebok Stadium
15:00 GMT	Medo 23'; Mason 45'; Spearing 47'; Moritz 90'	Report		Attendance: 17,541; Referee: Paul Tierney

8 March 2014	Leeds United	1–5	Bolton Wanderers	Elland Road
15:00 GMT	Smith 90'	Report	Mason 45'; Jutkiewicz 52'; Knight 56'; M. Davies 72'; Moritz 89'	Attendance: 28,904; Referee: Keith Hill

11 March 2014	Derby County	0–0	Bolton Wanderers	iPro Stadium
19:45 GMT		Report		Attendance: 23,435; Referee: Graham Scott

15 March 2014	Bolton Wanderers	0–2	Brighton	Reebok Stadium
15:00 GMT		Report	Buckley 13', 65'	Attendance: 15,336; Referee: Scott Duncan

22 March 2014	Yeovil Town	2–2	Bolton Wanderers	Huish Park
15:00 GMT	Miller 33'; Dawson 42'	Report	Jutkiewicz 53'; Baptiste (red card) 80'; Knight 83'	Attendance: 6,344; Referee: Darren Deadman

25 March 2014	Bolton Wanderers	1–0	Blackpool	Reebok Stadium
20:00 GMT	Wheater 16'	Report		Attendance: 14,903; Referee: Mark Clattenburg

29 March 2014	Bolton Wanderers	1–1	Wigan Athletic	Reebok Stadium
15:00 GMT	Jutkiewicz 31'	Report	Powell 88'	Attendance: 18,853; Referee: Darren Drysdale

5 April 2014	Huddersfield Town	0–1	Bolton Wanderers	John Smith's Stadium
15:00 BST		Report	Mason 90'	Attendance: 15,120; Referee: Jeremy Simpson

8 April 2014	Doncaster Rovers	1–2	Bolton Wanderers	Keepmoat Stadium
19:45 BST	Cotterill 18'	Report	Danns 7'; Mason 15'	Attendance: 7,508; Referee: Gary Sutton

12 April 2014	Bolton Wanderers	1–0	Barnsley	Reebok Stadium
15:07 BST	Beckford 44'	Report		Attendance: 15,845; Referee: James Adcock

18 April 2014	Charlton Athletic	0–0	Bolton Wanderers	The Valley
15:00 BST		Report		Attendance: 15,773; Referee: Brendan Malone

22 April 2014	Bolton Wanderers	0–1	Leicester City	Reebok Stadium
20:00 BST		Report	Dyer 62'	Attendance: 16,569; Referee: David Webb

26 April 2014	Sheffield Wednesday	1–3	Bolton Wanderers	Hillsborough
15:00 BST	Mattock 38'	Report	Danns 8'; C.Y. Lee 19'; Trotter 29'	Attendance: 23,070; Referee: Andy Davies

3 May 2014	Bolton Wanderers	2–2	Birmingham City	Reebok Stadium
12:15 BST	C.Y. Lee 57'; Jutkiewicz 76'	Report	Žigić 78'; Caddis 90+4'	Attendance: 19,558; Referee: Iain Williamson

=== League table ===
Pos	Team	Pld	W	D	L	GF	GA	GD	Pts
12	Middlesbrough	46	16	16	14	62	50	+12	64
13	Watford	46	15	15	16	74	64	+10	60
14	Bolton Wanderers	46	14	17	15	59	60	−1	59
15	Leeds United	46	16	9	21	59	67	−8	57
16	Sheffield Wednesday	46	13	14	19	63	65	−2	53

Source: BBC Sport
Rules for classification: 1) points; 2) goal difference; 3) number of goals scored

=== Results by round ===
Round	1	2	3	4	5	6	7	8	9	10	11	12	13	14	15	16	17	18	19	20	21	22	23	24	25	26	27	28	29	30	31	32	33	34	35	36	37	38	39	40	41	42	43	44	45	46
Ground	A	H	A	H	A	H	H	A	H	A	A	H	H	A	H	A	A	H	H	A	H	A	A	H	H	A	A	A	H	H	A	H	H	A	A	H	A	H	H	A	A	H	A	H	A	H
Result	D	D	L	L	L	L	D	L	D	D	W	D	D	W	W	W	L	L	W	L	D	W	L	D	D	L	L	L	D	L	D	W	W	W	D	L	D	W	D	W	W	W	D	L	W	D
Position	11	16	19	21	24	23	24	24	23	23	20	21	21	19	17	15	16	18	15	16	18	17	18	18	18	18	18	20	19	19	19	19	18	17	16	17	17	17	17	15	14	14	14	14	14	14

Updated to match(es) played on 3 May 2014. Source: BBC Sport
A = Away; H = Home; W = Win; D = Draw; L = Loss

=== Results summary ===
Overall								Home						Away					
Pld	W	D	L	GF	GA	GD	Pts	W	D	L	GF	GA	GD	W	D	L	GF	GA	GD
46	14	17	15	59	60	−1	59	6	11	6	29	23	+6	8	6	9	30	37	−7

Last updated: 3 May 2014.
Source: BBC Sport

== FA Cup ==
Bolton will enter the FA Cup at the Third Round stage with the other Championship clubs, as well as those from the Premier League. On 8 December, Bolton were drawn to play Blackpool at the Reebok Stadium, with the match played on 4 January 2014. David Ngog scored his second goal in as many games to open the scoring before Tom Barkhuizen scored just before half-time to level matters. The goal was initially ruled out for offside as a Blackpool player had impeded Andy Lonergan's view when in an offside position, but referee Simon Hooper overruled his assistant. Five minutes after the restart, however, Ngog set up Jermaine Beckford to score his 17th goal in 20 FA Cup games, with the goal also meaning that he had scored in the 3rd Round of the FA Cup for the fifth season running, all for different clubs. The following day, Bolton were drawn against Ole Gunnar Solskjær's Cardiff City in the next round, again at home. Substitute Fraizer Campbell scored just after half-time for the Bluebirds to send Bolton out of the FA Cup; who exited at the fourth round for the second consecutive year.

4 January 2014 3rd Round	Bolton Wanderers	2–1	Blackpool	Reebok Stadium
15:00 GMT	Ngog 10'; Beckford 51'	Report	Barkhuizen 45'	Attendance: 11,180; Referee: Simon Hooper

25 January 2014 4th Round	Bolton Wanderers	0–1	Cardiff City	Reebok Stadium
15:00 GMT		Report	Campbell 50'	Attendance: 12,750; Referee: Jonathan Moss

== League Cup ==
Bolton entered the League Cup at the first round stage for the first time since the 2000–01 season, alongside all other Football League clubs except Wigan Athletic and Reading. The draw took place on 17 June 2013 and gave Bolton an away tie at Shrewsbury Town. Bolton took the lead with a long-range goal from Robert Hall, before Shrewsbury Town equalised through Aaron Wildig. Making his full debut for the club, academy graduate Sanmi Odelusi then scored two goals either side of half-time to put Bolton 3–1 up. Bolton saw out the game to progress into the second round of the League Cup. André Moritz also made his debut, coming off the bench, after joining on 1 August 2013. The draw for the second round of the League Cup was made on 8 August, with Bolton playing Tranmere Rovers at Prenton Park on 27 August. At Prenton Park, Bolton went 1–0 down just before half-time as Cole Stockton scored for Tranmere. Bolton equalised through Jermaine Beckford's first goal for the club, but could not find another before the end of normal time, thus forcing the game into extra time. With no goals scored in the extra half-hour, the game moved to a penalty shoot-out. André Moritz and Alex Baptiste both had penalties saved by Owain Fôn Williams to send Bolton out of the League Cup.

6 August 2013 1st Round	Shrewsbury Town	1–3	Bolton Wanderers	Greenhous Meadow
19:45 BST	Wildig 29'	Report	Hall 26'; Odelusi 43', 52'	Attendance: 3,456; Referee: Steve Bratt

27 August 2013 2nd Round	Tranmere Rovers	1–1 (a.e.t.) (4–2 p)	Bolton Wanderers	Prenton Park
19:45 BST	Stockton 45'	Report	Beckford 66'	Attendance: 3,379; Referee: Stephen Martin
	Penalties
	Power (penalty scored); Akpa Akpro (penalty scored); Horwood (penalty scored); Rowe (penalty scored)		(penalty missed) Moritz; (penalty scored) Beckford; (penalty scored) Mills; (penalty missed) Baptiste

== Squad statistics ==
No.	Pos.	Name	League		FA Cup		League Cup		Total		Discipline	
No.	Pos.	Name	Apps	Goals	Apps	Goals	Apps	Goals	Apps	Goals	Yellow card	Red card
1	GK	(Hungary) Ádám Bogdán	29	0	0	0	0	0	29	0	1	0
2	DF	(England) Tyrone Mears	1	0	0	0	2	0	3	0	0	0
3	DF	(Scotland) Alan Hutton	9	0	0	0	0	0	9	0	0	0
4	DF	(England) Matt Mills	32	1	2	0	1	0	35	1	6	0
5	DF	(United States) Tim Ream	42	0	2	0	1	0	45	0	1	0
6	MF	(England) Jay Spearing	45	2	1	0	0	0	46	2	5	0
7	MF	(England) Chris Eagles	16	1	2	0	0	0	18	1	3	0
8	MF	(Republic of Ireland) Keith Andrews	1	0	0	0	1	0	2	0	0	0
9	FW	(France) David Ngog	17	3	1	1	1	0	19	4	1	0
10	FW	(Jamaica) Jermaine Beckford	33	7	1	1	1	1	35	9	3	0
11	MF	(England) Robert Hall	22	1	0	0	2	1	24	2	2	0
12	DF	(England) Zat Knight	31	2	2	0	2	0	35	2	1	0
14	MF	(Brazil) André Moritz	23	7	2	0	2	0	27	7	2	0
15	DF	(England) Alex Baptiste	39	4	2	0	2	0	43	4	6	1
16	MF	(England) Mark Davies	18	1	0	0	0	0	18	1	4	0
17	DF	(Scotland) Kevin McNaughton	13	1	0	0	0	0	13	1	1	0
17	MF	(England) Liam Trotter	16	1	0	0	0	0	16	1	0	0
18	MF	(England) Neil Danns	33	6	2	0	0	0	35	6	4	0
19	FW	(England) Marvin Sordell	0	0	0	0	0	0	0	0	0	0
20	DF	(England) Joe Riley	0	0	0	0	0	0	0	0	0	0
21	MF	(England) Darren Pratley	20	2	1	0	2	0	23	2	6	1
22	MF	(United States) Stuart Holden	0	0	0	0	0	0	0	0	0	0
23	DF	(England) Marc Tierney	8	0	0	0	1	0	9	0	2	0
24	GK	(England) Andy Lonergan	17	0	2	0	2	0	21	0	0	0
25	MF	(England) Josh Vela	0	0	1	0	1	0	2	0	0	0
26	MF	(England) Liam Feeney	4	0	0	0	0	0	4	0	0	0
26	FW	(Republic of Ireland) Joe Mason	16	6	0	0	0	0	16	6	0	0
27	MF	(South Korea) Lee Chung-Yong	45	3	2	0	0	0	47	3	6	0
28	FW	(Wales) Craig Davies	8	0	1	0	1	0	10	0	1	0
29	MF	(Slovakia) Ján Greguš	0	0	0	0	0	0	0	0	0	0
29	FW	(England) Lukas Jutkiewicz	20	7	0	0	0	0	20	7	0	0
30	FW	(Scotland) Michael O'Halloran	0	0	0	0	0	0	0	0	0	0
30	MF	(England) Andy Robinson	0	0	0	0	0	0	0	0	0	0
31	DF	(England) David Wheater	23	1	0	0	0	0	23	1	5	0
32	FW	(England) Tom Eaves	0	0	0	0	1	0	1	0	0	0
33	DF	(England) Hayden White	2	0	0	0	0	0	2	0	0	0
34	GK	(England) Jay Lynch	0	0	0	0	0	0	0	0	0	0
35	FW	(Republic of Ireland) Conor Wilkinson	0	0	0	0	0	0	0	0	0	0
36	DF	(Republic of Ireland) Cian Bolger	0	0	0	0	0	0	0	0	0	0
37	GK	(England) Arran Lee-Barrett	0	0	0	0	0	0	0	0	0	0
38	FW	(England) Sanmi Odelusi	5	0	1	0	2	2	8	2	1	0
39	MF	(Northern Ireland) Chris Lester	1	0	0	0	0	0	1	0	0	0
40	FW	(England) Zach Clough	0	0	0	0	0	0	0	0	0	0
41	DF	(England) Oscar Threlkeld	2	0	0	0	0	0	2	0	1	0
42	MF	(England) Luke Woodland	0	0	0	0	0	0	0	0	0	0
43	DF	(England) Andy Kellett	3	0	0	0	0	0	3	0	0	0
44	MF	(Sierra Leone) Medo Kamara	35	2	2	0	2	0	39	2	5	0
45	FW	(England) Tom Youngs	1	0	0	0	1	0	2	0	0	0
46	FW	(Bulgaria) Georg Iliev	0	0	0	0	0	0	0	0	0	0
–	–	Own goals	–	1	–	0	–	0	–	1		

== Transfers ==
=== Summer ===
On 7 May 2013, it was announced that seven academy graduates would not have their contracts renewed. Adam Blakeman, who made a senior appearance against Macclesfield Town in the League Cup, Alex McQuade, Jack Sampson, Joe McKee and goalkeeper Lewis Fielding were all released. On 30 April 2013, it was confirmed that Alex McQuade had signed a one-year deal with Shrewsbury Town. A further announcement was made by the club website on 8 May 2013, detailing two more academy graduates who would be leaving; defenders Ben Dennis and Ben Hampson. It had previously been announced that club captain Kevin Davies would not be offered a new contract at the end of the preceding season. On 14 May, it was announced that Bolton had signed two teenagers to add to their academy; 17-year-old Sheffield Wednesday full-back Hayden White and 18-year-old Millwall forward Conor Wilkinson. On 20 May, it was announced that Bolton had signed out-of-contract left-back Marc Tierney from Norwich City. Bolton further bolstered their defence with the signing of another out-of-contract defender, Alex Baptiste, on 22 May. On 30 May, the signing of Marc Tierney was further confirmed by the club. On 31 May, it was confirmed that left-back Marcos Alonso had completed his move to Italian side Fiorentina. On 3 June, it was announced that Scottish winger Gregg Wylde had his contract terminated over the preceding weekend, making him a free agent. On 25 June, it was announced that 23-year-old goalkeeper Rob Lainton would not have his contract renewed making him a free agent. The following day, on Tuesday 26 June, released forward Jack Sampson signed a two-year deal with League Two side Morecambe. After his contract with Blackpool ran out on 30 June, the signing of Alex Baptiste was confirmed by the club on 1 July. Later the same day, Bolton confirmed the signing of West Ham winger Rob Hall on a three-year deal. Hall had been on loan to Bolton towards the end of the previous season. On 4 July, the club confirmed that defender Sam Ricketts' contract had been cancelled by mutual agreement. Later the same day, Wolverhampton Wanderers confirmed that they had signed the Wales full-back on a free transfer. On 10 July, Bolton signed Gary Fraser, who had turned down an offer from the club in January, from Scottish outfit Hamilton Academical. This transfer was further confirmed by the club on 18 July. Former Leeds United striker Jermaine Beckford's protracted transfer from Leicester City was finally completed on 17 July. Bolton also signed 16-year-old Hungarian 'keeper Erik Bukran from Budapest Honvéd. Although not confirmed by the club, Bukran appeared as a substitute in a Bolton XI's pre-season game against Chorley. As was previously thought, Gary Fraser was loaned out to Partick Thistle in the SPL on 22 July, for an initial six-month period. On 1 August 2013, Bolton confirmed the free signing of Brazilian André Moritz on a one-year contract. Moritz had previously rejected a contract extension at his last club Crystal Palace. Shortly after it was confirmed that Marvin Sordell had moved to Charlton Athletic on a season-long loan. On 8 August, Bolton announced that former loanee Jay Spearing was having a medical with the club. The following day, Bolton's 2012–13 player of the year joined on a four-year contract. Released midfielder Adam Blakeman signed for non-league Hyde on 9 August. Following the arrival of Jay Spearing, fellow midfielder Keith Andrews was loaned to Brighton & Hove Albion for a season. Following on from Adam Blakeman's departure to Hyde, fellow academy graduate Ben Dennis also joined the non-league side.

Bolton's first piece of transfer activity following the opening of the loan transfer window was to send young striker Tom Eaves on loan to Rotherham United. The first incoming player of the loan transfer window for Bolton was Leicester City midfielder Neil Danns, who was brought in on a three-month deal. Following this, Bolton also signed midfielder Liam Feeney from Millwall, who also arrived on a three-month loan. After a month, Millwall chose to recall him. On the same day, Cardiff City's longest serving player Kevin McNaughton joined on a 28-day emergency loan deal. Following injuries to goalkeepers Ádám Bogdán and Jay Lynch in late October 2013, Bolton signed Arran Lee-Barrett on a short-term contract as back up to Andrew Lonergan on 24 October. On the same day, reserve team center back, Cian Bolger joined League One team Colchester United on a month's loan. Meanwhile, Millwall activated the 28-day release clause in Liam Feeney's contract to take him back to The Den two months earlier than expected. On 31 October, youth duo Chris Lester and Conor Wilkinson joined Conference Premier side Chester on month-long loans.

On 11 November 2013, a deal was agreed with Premier League side Cardiff City to loan forward Joe Mason until 5 January 2014. However, the following day it was announced that Cardiff manager Malky Mackay had had a change of heart over the deal and the striker stayed in South Wales, despite having travelled up to Bolton to train with them on the previous day. The deal was finally completed on 27 November, with Mason signing until 5 January 2014. On 28 November, Craig Davies was set to move on loan to Wolves, before the deal fell through.

On 25 November, Tom Eaves was recalled from his loan at Rotherham United, before returning to Shrewsbury Town on loan, to whom the striker was on loan the previous season, until 5 January 2014. Two days after Christmas Day, the loan stays of Kevin McNaughton and Neil Danns ended as their deals expired. However, Danns was then resigned on 3 January for the remainder of the season.

Although Hayden White, Conor Wilkinson and Robert Hall were signed by Bolton after their contracts had run out, Sheffield Wednesday, Millwall and West Ham, respectively, would be entitled to compensation as the players were under the age of 23. This also applied to Marcos Alonso, who moved to Fiorentina, although his former club Real Madrid would also be entitled to compensation, as he had come through their academy.

==== In ====
Date	Pos.	Name	From	Fee
1 July 2013	DF	(England) Alex Baptiste	(England) Blackpool	Free
1 July 2013	MF	(England) Robert Hall	(England) West Ham United	£462,000
1 July 2013	DF	(England) Marc Tierney	(England) Norwich City	Free
1 July 2013	DF	(England) Hayden White	(England) Sheffield Wednesday	Undisclosed
2 July 2013	FW	(Republic of Ireland) Conor Wilkinson	(England) Millwall	Undisclosed
17 July 2013	FW	(Jamaica) Jermaine Beckford	(England) Leicester City	Undisclosed
18 July 2013	MF	(Scotland) Gary Fraser	(Scotland) Hamilton Academical	Free
19 July 2013	GK	(Hungary) Erik Bukran	(Hungary) Budapest Honvéd	Undisclosed
1 August 2013	MF	(Brazil) André Moritz	(England) Crystal Palace	Free
9 August 2013	MF	(England) Jay Spearing	(England) Liverpool	£1,400,000
24 October 2013	GK	(England) Arran Lee-Barrett	(England) Millwall	Free

==== Out ====
Date	Pos.	Name	To	Fee
3 June 2013	MF	(Scotland) Gregg Wylde	(Scotland) Aberdeen	Free
30 June 2013	DF	(Spain) Marcos Alonso	(Italy) Fiorentina	Free
30 June 2013	MF	(England) Adam Blakeman	(England) Hyde	Free
30 June 2013	FW	(England) Kevin Davies	(England) Preston North End	Free
30 June 2013	DF	(England) Ben Dennis	(England) Hyde	Free
30 June 2013	GK	(England) Lewis Fielding	Released	Free
30 June 2013	DF	(England) Ben Hampson	Released	Free
30 June 2013	GK	(England) Rob Lainton	(England) Bury	Free
30 June 2013	MF	(Scotland) Joe McKee	(Scotland) Greenock Morton	Free
30 June 2013	DF	(England) Alex McQuade	(England) Shrewsbury Town	Free
30 June 2013	FW	(England) Jack Sampson	(England) Morecambe	Free
4 July 2013	DF	(Wales) Sam Ricketts	(England) Wolverhampton Wanderers	Free

==== Loan in ====
Date from	Date to	Pos.	Name	From
26 September 2013	30 June 2014	MF	(England) Neil Danns	(England) Leicester City
27 September 2013	24 October 2013	MF	(England) Liam Feeney	(England) Millwall
27 September 2013	27 December 2013	DF	(Scotland) Kevin McNaughton	(Wales) Cardiff City
27 November 2013	2 January 2014	FW	(Republic of Ireland) Joe Mason	(Wales) Cardiff City

==== Loan out ====
Date from	Date to	Pos.	Name	To
22 July 2013	6 January 2014	MF	(Scotland) Gary Fraser	(Scotland) Partick Thistle
1 August 2013	30 June 2014	FW	(England) Marvin Sordell	(England) Charlton Athletic
10 August 2013	30 June 2014	MF	(Republic of Ireland) Keith Andrews	(England) Brighton & Hove Albion
21 September 2013	25 November 2013	FW	(England) Tom Eaves	(England) Rotherham United
24 October 2013	24 November 2013	DF	(Republic of Ireland) Cian Bolger	(England) Colchester United
31 October 2013	30 November 2013	MF	(Northern Ireland) Chris Lester	(England) Chester
31 October 2013	30 November 2013	FW	(Republic of Ireland) Conor Wilkinson	(England) Chester
28 November 2013	30 June 2014	FW	(England) Tom Eaves	(England) Shrewsbury Town

=== Winter ===
On 3 January, youth striker Michael O'Halloran signed permanently for Scottish side St Johnstone. Slovakian midfielder Ján Greguš returned to Baník Ostrava after his year-long loan ended, while another youth midfielder, Gary Fraser, left the club; signing permanently for Partick Thistle to whom he had been on loan throughout the season. Following this, on 27 January, French striker David Ngog, who had been at the club since 2011, left for Premier League Swansea. Bolton secured their first incoming transfer of the January window the following day; Lukas Jutkiewicz joining from Middlesbrough to replace the outgoing Ngog. On the final day of the Winter transfer window, 20-year-old Luxembourg international Yannick Bastos signed an 18-month deal with the club. Following this, Bolton signed Millwall's Liam Trotter on loan until the end of the season, with a view to a permanent deal as the player was out of contract at the end of the season. Academy striker Conor Wilkinson joined Torquay United on Valentine's Day, on a month-long loan. Joe Mason returned to the club on 20 February; his second loan spell at the club lasting until April 12. The following day, Sanmi Odelusi and Cian Bolger were loaned to MK Dons and Southend United, respectively; both on one-month loans. Bolger had to be withdrawn 80 minutes into his Southend debut due to injury, and returned to Bolton the following Monday. On 21 March, Josh Vela was sent on loan to Notts County, who were bottom of League One and managed by Dougie Freedman's former Crystal Palace teammate Shaun Derry. The loan was an initial 28-day youth loan. On 24 March, Sanmi Odelusi's loan at MK Dons was extended until 3 May, after the end of the season. 3 May was also the date until which Southampton's Andy Robinson was loaned. The young midfielder had been on trial before making the move with a view to a permanent deal. On 31 March, Alan Hutton's loan was extended until the end of the season. On 4 May, a statement announced that the loan deals of five players would be coming to an end. Neil Danns, Alan Hutton, Lukas Jutkiewicz, Andy Robinson and Liam Trotter all returned to their parent clubs, though it was previously announced that Danns had signed a pre-contract with the club and would return following the expiration of his contract with Leicester City.

==== In ====
Date	Pos.	Name	From	Fee
31 January 2014	MF	(Luxembourg) Yannick Bastos	(Luxembourg) Differdange 03	Undisclosed

==== Out ====
Date	Pos.	Name	To	Fee
3 January 2014	FW	(Scotland) Michael O'Halloran	(Scotland) St Johnstone	Free
10 January 2014	MF	(Scotland) Gary Fraser	(Scotland) Partick Thistle	Free
27 January 2014	FW	(France) David Ngog	(Wales) Swansea City	Undisclosed

==== Loan in ====
Date from	Date to	Pos.	Name	From
28 January 2014	4 May 2014	FW	(England) Lukas Jutkiewicz	(England) Middlesbrough
31 January 2014	4 May 2014	MF	(England) Liam Trotter	(England) Millwall
20 February 2014	12 April 2014	FW	(Republic of Ireland) Joe Mason	(Wales) Cardiff City
28 February 2014	4 May 2014	DF	(Scotland) Alan Hutton	(England) Aston Villa
27 March 2014	4 May 2014	MF	(England) Andy Robinson	(England) Southampton

==== Loan out ====
Date from	Date to	Pos.	Name	To
31 January 2014	30 June 2014	FW	(Wales) Craig Davies	(England) Preston North End
14 February 2014	14 March 2014	FW	(Republic of Ireland) Conor Wilkinson	(England) Torquay United
21 February 2014	3 May 2014	FW	(England) Sanmi Odelusi	(England) MK Dons
21 February 2014	24 February 2014	DF	(Republic of Ireland) Cian Bolger	(England) Southend United
21 March 2014	30 June 2014	MF	(England) Josh Vela	(England) Notts County
