= Andy Robinson (footballer, born 1992) =

English footballer

Personal information
- Full name: Andreas Sonny Robinson
- Date of birth: 16 October 1992 (age 34)
- Place of birth: Bournemouth, England
- Height: 6 ft 2 in (1.88 m)
- Position: Midfielder

Team information
- Current team: Havant & Waterlooville

Youth career
- 2001–2012: Southampton

Senior career*
Years	Team	Apps	(Gls)
2012–2014	Southampton	0	(0)
2014	→ Bolton Wanderers (loan)	0	(0)
2014	Bolton Wanderers	0	(0)
2014–2015	Dorchester Town	11	(1)
2015–2016	Gosport Borough	30	(1)
2016–2019	Havant & Waterlooville	105	(4)
2019–2022	Weymouth	72	(4)
2022–2024	Gosport Borough		
2024–2026	Weymouth	75	(2)
2026–	Havant & Waterlooville	0	(0)
- * Club domestic league appearances and goals as of 20:05, 25 November 2025 (UTC)

Andreas Sonny "Andy" Robinson (born 16 October 1992) is an English semi-professional footballer who primarily plays as a central midfielder for Havant & Waterlooville.

== Early life ==
Robinson was born in Bournemouth.

== Club career ==
=== Southampton ===
Described as "a strong presence in the heart of midfield", Andy Robinson joined the Southampton Academy at the age of eight, and has previously captained the club's under-18 side. The midfielder was promoted to the Southampton first team at the beginning of the 2012–13 season, and made his debut for the team on 25 September 2012 in a 2−0 win over Sheffield Wednesday in the third round of the League Cup, coming on as an 81st-minute substitute for Jack Cork.

=== Bolton Wanderers ===
On 27 March 2014, Robinson joined Football League Championship club Bolton Wanderers on loan until the end of the season. During his loan spell he spent no time on the pitch, making 6 appearances on the substitutes bench. Despite this, on 21 May it was confirmed that Robinson would join Bolton on a one-year contract from July 2014. However, on 19 July the club confirmed the player had left as he had failed to settle in the area.

=== Dorchester Town ===
On 9 October 2014, Robinson signed non contract terms with Southern Football League club Dorchester Town.

=== Weymouth ===
On 28 June 2019, Robinson joined Weymouth.

== Career statistics ==
As of match played 2 December 2017

Appearances and goals by club, season and competition
Club	Season	League			FA Cup		League Cup		Other		Total	
Club	Season	Division	Apps	Goals	Apps	Goals	Apps	Goals	Apps	Goals	Apps	Goals
Southampton	2012–13	Premier League	0	0	0	0	1	0	—		1	0
Southampton	2013–14	Premier League	0	0	0	0	0	0	—		0	0
Bolton Wanderers (loan)	2013–14	Championship	0	0	0	0	0	0	—		0	0
Dorchester Town	2014–15	SFL - Premier Division	11	1	1	0	—				11	1
Gosport Borough	2014–15	Conference South	15	1	0	0	—		0	0	15	1
Gosport Borough	2015–16	Conference South	15	0	0	0	—		0	0	15	0
Gosport Borough	Gosport total		40	2	0	0	0	0	0	0	40	2
Havant & Waterlooville	2015–16	National League South	9	0	0	0	—		0	0	9	0
Havant & Waterlooville	2016–17	IL - Premier Division					—					
Havant & Waterlooville	2017–18	National League South	16	0	0	0	—		0	0	16	0
Havant & Waterlooville	Total		25	0	0	0	0	0	0	0	25	0
Career total			65	2	1	0	1	0	0	0	66	2
