= Gary Fraser =

Scottish footballer

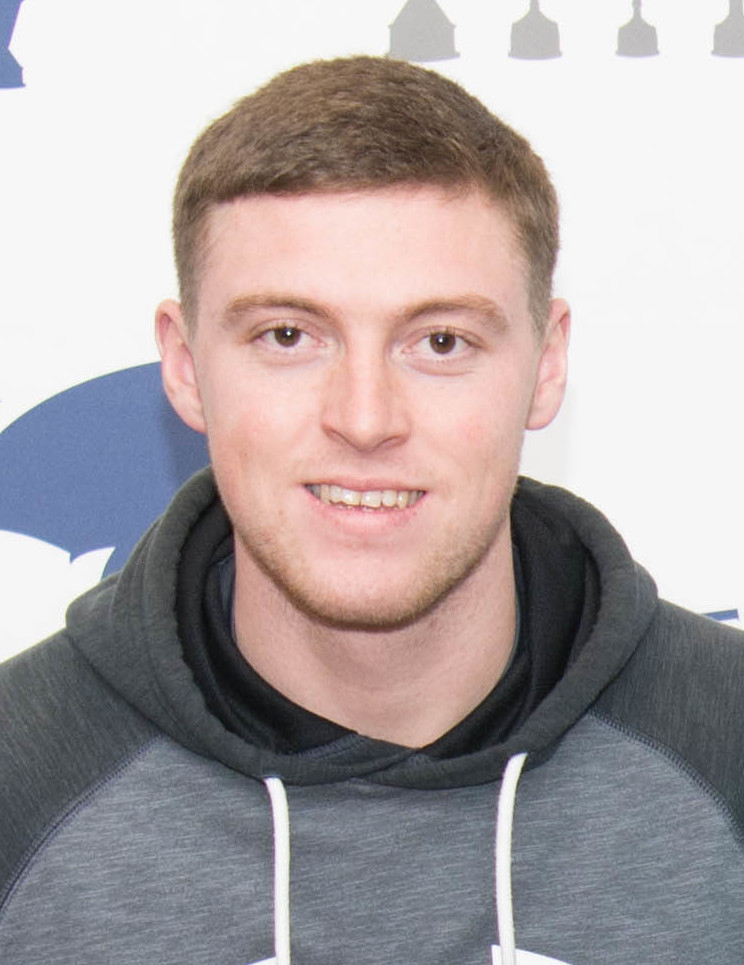

Personal information
- Date of birth: 2 July 1994 (age 32)
- Place of birth: Glasgow, Scotland
- Positions: Defender; midfielder

Team information
- Current team: Broomhill

Youth career
- Celtic
- Hamilton Academical

Senior career*
Years	Team	Apps	(Gls)
2011–2013	Hamilton Academical	15	(0)
2013–2014	Bolton Wanderers	0	(0)
2013–2014	→ Partick Thistle (loan)	4	(0)
2014–2018	Partick Thistle	52	(6)
2018	→ Greenock Morton (loan)	6	(1)
2018	Forfar Athletic	0	(0)
2018–2019	Cowdenbeath	6	(0)
2019–2022	Peterhead	40	(2)
2022–	Broomhill		
- * Club domestic league appearances and goals as of 18:08, 17 May 2022 (UTC)

Gary Fraser (born 2 July 1994) is a Scottish professional footballer, who plays as a midfielder for Broomhill.

Fraser began his career with Hamilton Academical, and has since played for Bolton Wanderers, Partick Thistle, Greenock Morton, Cowdenbeath and Peterhead.

== Career ==
=== Early career ===
Fraser was in the Celtic youth system, before making his professional debut for Hamilton Academical on 27 August 2011. He turned down a move to English club Bolton Wanderers in January 2013. He was released by Hamilton in May 2013.

Fraser scored twice as a trialist for Partick Thistle in a pre-season friendly against Annan Athletic in a 5–1 victory in early July 2013.

On 11 July 2013 it was announced that Fraser had signed a two-year contract with Bolton Wanderers.

=== Partick Thistle ===
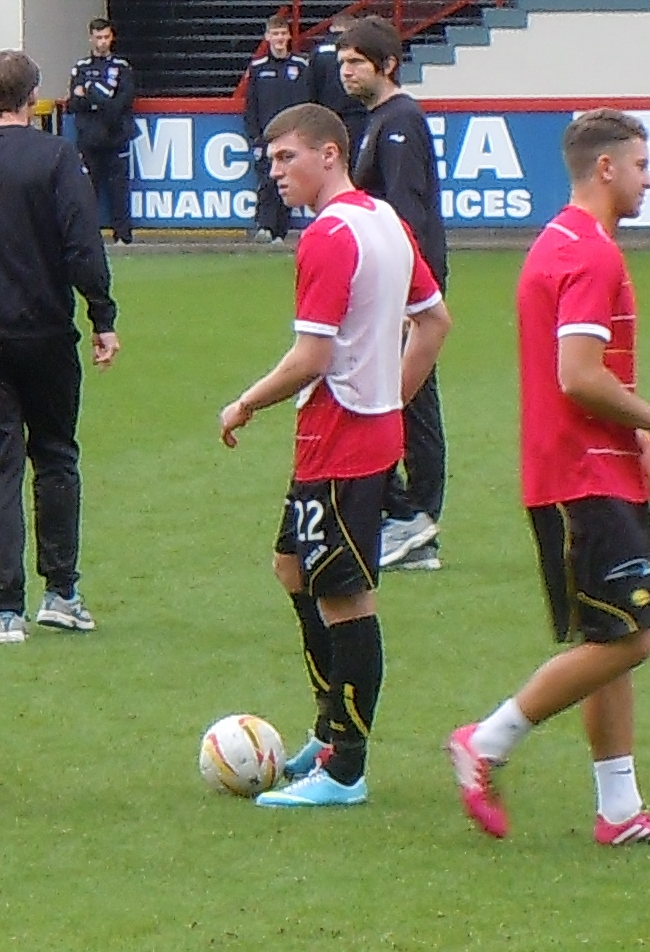
Fraser warming up in 2014.

On 23 July 2013 he moved to Partick Thistle on a 6-month loan deal. After attacking an opponent in an U20 league fixture against Dunfermline Athletic in October 2013, Fraser was cited by the SFA compliance officer and faced a potential one-year ban from Scottish football. Fraser was eventually banned for a total of nine games, running until 1 January 2014. The ban ends three days before his loan deal expires, and the club stated they were considering extending it. On 6 January 2014, Fraser returned to Bolton after his loan with Partick Thistle came to an end. Four days later, on 10 January 2014, he signed a permanent two-and-a-half-year contract with Thistle.

Following a successful survival campaign in the 2013–14 Scottish Premiership season, Fraser signed a further contract, keeping him at Firhill until 2017. Fraser suffered a serious knee injury that caused him to miss the whole of the 2016/17 season. He signed a short-term contract with Thistle in the summer of 2017, and made his first competitive appearance for 18 months in November 2017. In December, Fraser apologised for hitting a Celtic supporter by kicking a football into the stand. In early January, his contract was extended to the end of the 2017–18 season.

Fraser was loaned to Championship club Greenock Morton in March 2018. Partick Thistle were relegated via the playoffs at the end of the 2017/18 season. Following that relegation, Fraser was one of many players released by Thistle.

During the 2018 close season, Fraser signed for Forfar Athletic. Later that season he signed for Cowdenbeath.

He moved to Broomhill in May 2022.

== Career statistics ==
As of match played 19 November 2017

Appearances and goals by club, season and competition
Club	Season	League			National Cup		League Cup		Other		Total	
Club	Season	Division	Apps	Goals	Apps	Goals	Apps	Goals	Apps	Goals	Apps	Goals
Hamilton Academical	2011–12	First Division	4	0	0	0	0	0	0	0	4	0
Hamilton Academical	2012–13	First Division	11	0	1	0	2	0	1 (Note: Appearance in the Scottish Challenge Cup)	0	15	0
Hamilton Academical	Total		15	0	1	0	2	0	1	0	19	0
Bolton Wanderers	2013–14	Championship	0	0	0	0	0	0	—		0	0
Partick Thistle (loan)	2013–14	Premiership	4	0	0	0	0	0	—		4	0
Partick Thistle	2013–14	Premiership	15	2	0	0	0	0	—		15	2
Partick Thistle	2014–15	Premiership	23	3	2	0	1	0	—		26	3
Partick Thistle	2015–16	Premiership	12	1	1	0	1	0	—		14	1
Partick Thistle	2016–17	Premiership	0	0	0	0	0	0	—		0	0
Partick Thistle	2017–18	Premiership	2	0	0	0	0	0	—		2	0
Partick Thistle	Total		56	6	3	0	2	0	0	0	61	6
Career total			71	6	4	0	4	0	1	0	80	6
