= 2012–13 Bolton Wanderers F.C. season =

Bolton Wanderers F.C.
2012–13 season
- Chairman: Phil Gartside
- Manager: Owen Coyle (until 9 October 2012); Jimmy Phillips (caretaker from 9 October 2012 until 25 October 2012); Dougie Freedman (from 25 October 2012)
- Stadium: Reebok Stadium
- Championship: 7th
- FA Cup: Fourth round
- League Cup: Second round
- Top goalscorer: League: Chris Eagles (12); All: Chris Eagles (12)
- Highest home attendance: 24,844 v Blackpool; 4 May 2012
- Lowest home attendance: 15,675 v Peterborough United; 26 February 2013
- Average home league attendance: 18,034
Home colours	Away colours	Third colours

The 2012–13 season was Bolton Wanderers first season in the Football League Championship since 2001 following their relegation from the Premier League. Bolton ultimately missed out on a play-off spot, being overtaken by Leicester City on the final day of the season, meaning Bolton spent the 2013–14 season in the Championship.

The season covered the period from 1 July 2012 to 30 June 2013.

== Pre-season ==
On 24 May, Bolton announced an initial ten fixtures to precede the 2012–13 season. These took in away games at League One sides Crewe Alexandra, Portsmouth, Tranmere Rovers and League Two sides Morecambe and Accrington Stanley. They also played five non league sides, Bamber Bridge, Radcliffe Borough, Chorley, Barrow and FC Halifax Town. All five of the latter games, along with the game at Accrington Stanley and another game at Daisy Hill which was announced on 2 August, were played by a Development squad. An additional game, the only one to be played at the Reebok Stadium, against Barcelona B, the reserve side of Barcelona, was announced on 29 June. On 6 June, a tour of Scotland was announced, with the team visiting Ayr United, Hamilton Academical and Falkirk.

Bolton began their pre-season games at Ayr United where they drew 1–1, Marcos Alonso scoring midway through the second half before Mark Roberts equalised for the home side. Three days later, Bolton travelled to Hamilton Academical where, after a quiet first half, Hamilton won the game with two quick goals through Andy Ryan and Stephen Hendrie. Bolton completed their Scottish tour with a trip to Falkirk four days later. Falkirk striker Lyle Taylor scored after just fifteen seconds, lobbing Ádám Bogdán, with Chris Eagles equalising 14 minutes later. The game finished as a draw, meaning that Bolton finished their time in Scotland without a win.

The club's first game after returning to England was against Crewe Alexandra. Crewe took the lead on thirteen minutes through Max Clayton, but Bolton equalised when Martin Petrov converted a penalty midway though the first half. With no further goals scored, Bolton still remained without a win during the pre season. The first win of the pre-season came in the following game, when two early goals from Chris Eagles and David Ngog, playing his first game after injury had kept him out of the previous fixtures, gave Bolton a 2–0 victory over Morecambe. This was followed by a 3–0 loss at Portsmouth, where the home side scored two goals through Kieran Djilali and Liam Lawrence, with Ashley Harris scoring a third in the second half. New signing Benik Afobe made his first appearance for Bolton as a substitute during the game. Afobe made his second appearance for the club, and scored a hat trick, in Bolton's penultimate pre season game, as they beat Tranmere Rovers 3–1, Jean-Louis Akpa Akpro replying for the home team. Bolton concluded their pre-season with a 2–2 draw at home at Barcelona B. The home side, playing their only pre-season game at The Reebok Stadium, twice came from behind, Marvin Sordell and a Sergi Gómez own goal cancelling out efforts by Cristian Lobato and Iván Balliu.

18 July 2012	Ayr United	1–1	Bolton Wanderers	Ayr
19:45 BST	Roberts 78'	Report	Alonso 70'	Stadium: Somerset Park

21 July 2012	Hamilton Academical	2–0	Bolton Wanderers	Hamilton
15:00 BST	Ryan 61'; Hendrie 67'	Report		Stadium: New Douglas Park; Attendance: 779; Referee: Willie Collum

25 July 2012	Falkirk	1–1	Bolton Wanderers	Falkirk
19:30 BST	Taylor 1'		Eagles 14'	Stadium: Falkirk Stadium; Attendance: 1359

28 July 2012	Crewe Alexandra	1–1	Bolton Wanderers	Crewe
15:00 BST	Clayton 13'		Petrov 27' (pen.)	Stadium: Alexandra Stadium; Attendance: 2,440

1 August 2012	Morecambe	0–2	Bolton Wanderers	Morecambe
19:45 BST			Eagles 3'; Ngog 12'	Stadium: Globe Arena; Attendance: 1,352

4 August 2012	Portsmouth	3–0	Bolton Wanderers	Portsmouth
15:00 BST	Djilali 7'; Lawrence 13'; Harris 55'			Stadium: Fratton Park; Attendance: 4,193

7 August 2012	Tranmere Rovers	1–3	Bolton Wanderers	Birkenhead
19:30 BST	Akpa Akpro 90'	Report	Afobe 50', 74', 77'	Stadium: Prenton Park; Attendance: 1,519; Referee: Mike Jones

10 August 2012	Bolton Wanderers	2–2	Barcelona B	Bolton
20:00 BST	Gómez 58' (o.g.); Sordell 71'		Lobato 53'; Balliu 67'	Stadium: Reebok Stadium; Attendance: 6,885

=== Reserves ===
20 July 2012	Bamber Bridge	1–1	Bolton Wanderers	Bamber Bridge
19:30 BST	Gonzales 20'	Report	Sampson 48'	Stadium: QED Stadium; Referee: Neil Swarbrick

27 July 2012	Radcliffe Borough	2–2	Bolton Wanderers	Radcliffe
19:30 BST	McDonagh 35', 68'		Eaves 50'; McQuade 85'	Stadium: Stainton Park

31 July 2012	Chorley	0–1	Bolton Wanderers	Chorley
19:30 BST			Woodland 80'	Stadium: Victory Park; Attendance: 616

3 August 2012	Barrow	1–1	Bolton Wanderers	Barrow
19:30 BST	Rowe 85'		Pearson 84' (o.g.)	Stadium: Holker Street

6 August 2012	Daisy Hill	0–10	Bolton Wanderers	Westhoughton
19:30 BST			Lester (4); Clough; Youngs; Holding; Hamer; Trialist; Own Goal	Stadium: New Sirs

8 August 2012	FC Halifax Town	1–0	Bolton Wanderers	Halifax
19:45 BST	Gregory 36'			Stadium: The Shay

13 August 2012	Accrington Stanley	2–2	Bolton Wanderers	Accrington
19:00 BST	Amond 8'; Hatfield 48'		Wolstenholme 18'; Eaves 40'	Stadium: Crown Ground

== Championship ==
The fixtures for the 2012–13 season were announced on 18 June at 09:00 BST, and revealed that Bolton would begin the season away from home at manager Owen Coyle's former club Burnley on 18 August 2012. On 15 August, midfielder Fabrice Muamba announced his retirement, following his cardiac arrest earlier in the year.

=== August ===
The season did not get off to the best of starts, with Bolton losing at Burnley. Goals from Martin Paterson and Charlie Austin gave the home side a 2–0 win. Keith Andrews and Benik Afobe made their debuts for Bolton, Andrews starting and Afobe coming on as a second-half substitute for Kevin Davies. This meant that Bolton began the season in the relegation zone, in twenty second place. Three days later, Bolton played their first home game of the season, against Derby County. After a goalless first half, Bolton took the lead through Kevin Davies with 13 minutes left before Chris Eagles doubled the lead in added time to give Bolton their first win of the season and move them to 14th in the table. The following Friday, Bolton played in front of the television cameras for the first time this season, at home against Nottingham Forest. Forest took the lead when Lewis McGugan scored from 30 yards out, but Eagles equalised shortly before half time after a Kevin Davies header came back off a post. Marvin Sordell gave Bolton the lead four minutes into the second half, before Andy Reid equalised for Forest, the game finishing as a 2–2 draw. After the weekend results, Bolton had climbed one place to 13th. Bolton's Player of the Month for August was Chris Eagles.

=== September ===
Bolton began September away at Hull City on the first day of the month and took the lead through Chris Eagles' third goal of the season, a thirty five yard free kick. Sone Aluko scored an equaliser for the home side twelve minutes later before former Bolton player Abdoulaye Faye and Stephen Quinn scored two goals in quick succession shortly after half time to give Hull a 3–1 victory. Following their second defeat of the season, Bolton entered the first international break of the season in twentieth place in the division.

Bolton returned from the international break with a home fixture against Watford. A crowd of 16,608, Bolton's lowest league crowd since May 2001, saw Matt Mills score his first goal for the club early in the first half before Kevin Davies doubled the lead just before half time. Lloyd Doyley pulled one back for Watford, but Bolton held onto the lead and the victory took them up to 11th in the table. However, the next game saw them fall back to 15th as they lost 2–1 at Birmingham City. An early Leroy Lita goal was cancelled out by Chris Eagles just before half time, but Marlon King scored from the penalty spot soon after the restart to give the home side the win. The following Saturday, Bolton picked up their first away win of the season at Sheffield Wednesday. Marcos Alonso scored his first goal of the season late in the first half, but Wednesday replied with a second half penalty by Ross Barkley. However, Bolton claimed the win when Mark Davies, with his own first goal of the season, regained the lead almost immediately. The win took Bolton up to thirteenth position, but they failed to capitalize on this victory by losing 1–0 at home to Crystal Palace the following Saturday, Glenn Murray scoring the only goal of the game from the penalty spot after Zat Knight had fouled Wilfried Zaha. Bolton's Player of the Month for September was Chris Eagles again, winning it for the second month in a row.

=== October ===
A home game against Leeds United followed three days later. Kevin Davies scored his fourth and fifth goals of the season, but another conceded penalty, converted by Luciano Becchio, and a Sam Byram goal gave Leeds the draw. Bolton's last game before the next international break was away at Millwall. The home side took the lead through Darius Henderson midway through the first half but Chris Eagles equalised early in the second before missing a penalty. Bolton were ultimately punished for this miss by Henderson, who scored his second in stoppage time, giving Millwall the win. This meant that Bolton entered the international break in 18th place.

Three days later, on 9 October, manager Owen Coyle was relieved of his duties by the club, with Academy Director Jimmy Phillips and head of academy coaching and development, and former club manager, Sammy Lee being placed in temporary charge. Their first game in temporary charge was against Bristol City on 20 October. The away side took the lead early in the first half with Steven Davies scoring an overhead kick. He followed this up with a second from the penalty spot on 20 minutes. Chris Eagles scored from a free-kick ten minutes later, his sixth of the season, to make the score 2–1 to Bristol City at half-time. Jay Spearing scored his first goal for the club midway through the second half to equalise and Martin Petrov scored with eight minutes to give Bolton a 3–2 win, which moved them up to 15th.

Bolton began a run of two away games on 23 October at Wolverhampton Wanderers with Phillips still in charge. Bolton took the lead through Benik Afobe's first league goal of the season but Wolves replied before half-time with two Kevin Doyle goals within a three-minute period. With time running out, former Wolves player Mark Davies scored in the first minute of stoppage time, his second of the season, to equalise. Despite getting a point, Bolton dropped a place in the table to 16th. Dougie Freedman was named Bolton manager on 25 October with Phillips remaining in charge of team affairs for Bolton's next game away against Middlesbrough on 27 October. Bolton took the lead through Lee Chung-yong's first goal of the season shortly before half-time but two goals from Scott McDonald in the second half gave Middlesbrough the win. Following this loss, Bolton dropped two more places in the table to 18th. Bolton's Player of the Month for October was again Eagles, winning the award three months in a row.

=== November ===
After watching from the stands against Middlesbrough, Freedman took charge against league leaders Cardiff City on 3 November. Bolton fell behind in the 40th minute to a Craig Noone goal. In the second half, Freedman brought on David Ngog for captain Kevin Davies and Ngog had a goal incorrectly disallowed for offside before winning a penalty in the sixty ninth minute after being tripped by Kim Bo-kyung. Martin Petrov converted the penalty to equalise and then Ngog himself scored in the 74th minute to give Bolton a 2–1 lead before being sent off in stoppage time for a second bookable offence. Bolton held on for the three points, which moved them up one position in the table to seventeenth.

Bolton's next game was three days later against Leicester City with the game finishing goalless, which kept Bolton in 17th. An away game at Blackpool followed on 10 November, marking Freedman's first away game as manager. Bolton took the lead early in the first half with Mark Davies' third of the season, but Blackpool equalised three minutes later through Tom Ince. Bolton regained the lead late in the second half through Lee Chung-yong's second of the season but Blackpool equalised again ten minutes later, with Nathan Delfouneso scoring. The game finished 2–2 and the point kept Bolton in seventeenth position for the third match running. The following weekend, Bolton's played at home against Barnsley. Kevin Davies opened the scoring midway through the first half with his fifth goal of the Season but Barnsley equalised through Craig Davies midway in the second half. The game finished 1–1, Bolton's third consecutive draw, and the point kept Bolton in seventeenth position for the fourth match in succession.

Bolton's next match was against Brighton & Hove Albion. Ádám Bogdán saved a penalty from Brighton's Ashley Barnes in the first half and the home side also hit the post three times. Despite this, the first half finished goalless. Shortly after the break, Bruno scored for Brighton to give them the lead. With the game heading towards a close, David Ngog scored with the last kick of the game to equalise for Bolton. This was Bolton's fourth consecutive draw and they dropped one place in the table to eighteenth. Bolton's last match of November came four days later, away against their geographically closest divisional rivals, Blackburn Rovers. Wolverhampton Wanderers' defeat the previous evening had already seen Bolton rise back to 17th. Kevin Davies, with his sixth goal of the season, scored early on and Bolton doubled the lead midway through the second half through Lee Chung-yong's third of the season. Jordan Rhodes pulled one back for Blackburn with eight minutes to go, but Bolton held on to claim their second away win of the season and remained in the same position in the league. This win meant Bolton had gone the month of November undefeated, the first time they had managed to go a month unbeaten for two years. Bolton's Player of the Month was Kevin Davies.

=== December ===
Bolton's first game of December was at home against Ipswich Town. Bolton took the lead in the sixth minute through Mark Davies' fourth goal of the season. DJ Campbell equalised for Ipswich from the penalty spot with 20 minutes to go which was followed by a Michael Chopra winner for Ipswich in the last minute. This was Dougie Freedman's first loss as Bolton manager and was the end of Bolton's six game unbeaten run. Following the loss, Bolton dropped one place in the table to 18th. The following weekend, Bolton travelled to Huddersfield Town. Bolton went 1–0 down after a Zat Knight own goal. Bolton equalised through Mark Davies' 5th of the season and his second in consecutive games. Chris Eagles then missed a penalty but made up for it by scoring his seventh of the season to put Bolton 2–1 up. However James Vaughan equalised for Huddersfield with three minutes to go, giving Bolton another draw, which left them in 18th.

A week later, Bolton played Charlton Athletic at home. With the scores level at 0–0 for nearly all the match, substitute David Ngog scored twice in the space of six minutes in the final 15 minutes to win the game 2–0 for Bolton. The points moved Bolton up five places, from 18th to 13th. A week later, Bolton played bottom of the table Peterborough United. Within the first six minutes, Peterborough were 2–0 up through goals from Lee Tomlin and Dwight Gayle. Bolton pulled one back in first half stoppage time through a Keith Andrews penalty, his first goal of the season and his first for Bolton. Peterborough quickly got their two-goal advantage back though after the break when George Thorne scored and it then became a three-goal advantage when Mark Little scored. Andrews scored another penalty to reduce the deficit to two goals but Gabriel Zakuani scored to put it back to a three-goal advantage for Peterborough. With ten minutes to go, Bolton pulled two back through Benik Afobe's third of the season and Martin Petrov's third of the season, but it wasn't enough as the match ended in a 5–4 defeat. This defeat was Bolton's second of the month and it caused them to drop three places to 16th.

Bolton's next game was against Sheffield Wednesday at home on Boxing Day. Wednesday won with a goal from Mamady Sidibé midway through the first half. This was Bolton's second consecutive defeat. Despite defeat, Bolton remained in 16th. Bolton's final game of the year was at home to Birmingham City. After falling behind to a Nikola Žigić header after 11 minutes, Bolton equalised and then pulled ahead before the first half was over through goals from Marcos Alonso and Lee Chung-yong, respectively. Keith Andrews then converted a second half penalty to wrap up the three points and send Bolton into the new year in 14th place, and eight points off the play-offs. Jay Spearing, on loan from Liverpool, was December's Player of the Month.

=== January ===
Bolton started 2013 with a loss at Leeds United, a solitary goal scored by Luciano Becchio from the penalty spot being the difference. A home draw against Millwall followed, with each team scoring a penalty in the first half. Andy Keogh converted for the away side before Keith Andrews equalised. Bolton's final league game of January saw Dougie Freedman return to Crystal Palace for the first time since leaving as well as Jacob Butterfield's first appearance against Bolton since his loan period finished. The match ended goalless, securing Bolton's first clean sheet in the league since the opening day of the 2011–12 season, as they spent the whole of the month in 16th position. Marvin Sordell was January's Player of the Month.

=== February ===
Bolton began February with a visit to Watford. The game saw Marvin Sordell's first return to his former club since leaving the previous year and it was the former Watford man who opened the scoring through a penalty midway through the first half. Watford equalised almost immediately when Matěj Vydra scored and completed the turn around in the second half through Almen Abdi. The result saw Bolton fall to twentieth place, three points off the relegation zone. Their next game was at home against Burnley. Burnley took the lead through David Edgar shortly after half-time. Craig Davies scored his first goal for Bolton 11 minutes later which was followed 25 minutes later by a David Ngog winner, his fifth of the season. The win moved Bolton up three places to 17th.

Bolton's next match was away to Nottingham Forest after falling behind to an Andy Reid goal in the 59th minute, Bolton survived heavy pressure and equalised through Craig Davies' second goal in as many matches in the 77th minute. The match finished level despite Marcos Alonso being sent off for two bookable offences with ten minutes remaining to prevent returning Forest manager Billy Davies from starting his second spell in charge with a win. Against another of Brian Clough's former sides, Derby County, Bolton took the lead late in the first half with a headed goal that was initially attributed to Craig Dawson but was later given as an own goal by Derby captain Richard Keogh. Bolton could not hold on to their lead, however, and conceded to another headed goal in the 81st minute; Jamie Ward's tenth goal of the season. The draw left Bolton four points from the relegation zone and 12 points from the play-off positions.

Bolton's next game was against second-placed Hull City. Within eight minutes, Bolton were 3–0 up with goals from Darren Pratley; his first of the season, Mark Davies; his sixth of the season and Craig Dawson's first for the club. Robbie Brady pulled one back for Hull with a free-kick, but two minutes later Dawson scored again to give Bolton back their three-goal cushion. This proved to be the last goal of the game and Bolton won 4–1. The win, their second consecutive at home, moved them up two places to 14th. On the following Tuesday, Bolton played Peterborough United, the reverse fixture of which finished 5–4 to the opposing side. After Craig Dawson's third goal in two games in the fifth minute, Bolton hung on for a slender victory, sending them to a season-high of tenth in the table. Loanee Craig Dawson was named as Player of the Month for February.

=== March ===
Bolton's first match of the new month took place at Oakwell, against Barnsley. Bolton went into half-time with a two-goal lead following goals from David Ngog and then Jay Spearing. Barnsley pegged Bolton back to 2–2 in the second half through Tomasz Cywka and Chris O'Grady, but Craig Dawson scored his fourth goal in three games to hand Bolton the win, leaving them unbeaten in six with wins in each of their last three games and sending them above Nottingham Forest to ninth in the table. Three days later Bolton played local rivals Blackburn at home. Just as the game was looking to end in a goalless draw, Chris Eagles scored deep into injury time to win the game for Bolton. It was Eagles' first goal since December and was his 8th of the season. It was also Bolton's fourth consecutive home win, their fourth consecutive win and took their unbeaten spell to seven games. Bolton's next match was also at home, against Brighton & Hove Albion, who had occupied the final play-off spot before the match. Bolton won the match through a solitary Marcos Alonso goal in the first half, his third of the season. This allowed them to leapfrog Middlesbrough into eighth, two points behind Brighton and three behind Nottingham Forest in sixth place. Bolton's unbeaten streak came to an end against Ipswich Town at Portman Road, losing 1–0 to a late Carlos Edwards goal and leaving them five points off the play-offs going into the international break.

On 26 March, the club announced that they would not be offering long-serving captain Kevin Davies a new deal and that he would be leaving the club at the end of the season after ten years of service.

Bolton lost their first match after the international break away to Charlton Athletic. After initially going 2–0 up through Marvin Sordell and Medo's first for the club, Charlton hit back with three of their own, two of which came after Sam Ricketts was sent off for a second bookable offence. Bolton then had Craig Davies sent off in injury time. Bolton's Player of the Month for March was named as Marcos Alonso.

=== April ===
Bolton's first match of April was against Huddersfield Town at the Reebok Stadium. Bolton looked to extend their home winning streak to six games and they succeeded in this endeavor courtesy of a Chris Eagles goal in the second half. In their next game Bolton looked to make it seven consecutive wins at home for the first time since under Bruce Rioch in 1995. Two goals in the first ten minutes from David Ngog and Marcos Alonso and no reply from Wolves ensured they obtained the win and a fifth successive clean sheet at home. Bolton collected only their fourth away win of the season at Ashton Gate against bottom club Bristol City. A Liam Fontaine own goal gave Bolton the lead before Steven Davies equalised for City. Craig Davies scored from the penalty spot, his third of the season, to give Bolton the three points. The win moved Bolton into the play-off spots for the first time this season.

They were not able to follow this up with another away win, however, as they lost to fellow play-off chasers Leicester City. Bolton had initially taken the lead in the third minute through a penalty which David Ngog converted for his eighth goal of the campaign. Leicester hit back with two goals in three minutes towards the end of the first half; the goals coming from a Chris Wood penalty and Lloyd Dyer. Bolton equalised through Darren Pratley, but it wasn't enough as Jeff Schlupp volleyed home to send Bolton back to the Reebok Stadium with no points. Following this result, Bolton dropped to seventh place with Leicester City taking the vacated final play-off spot. Looking to extend their unbeaten home run in their penultimate home match of the season against Middlesbrough, Bolton forced their way back into the play-offs at the expense of Leicester. After a goalless first half, Bolton took the lead when Chris Eagles' cross looped over goalkeeper Jason Steele. Middlesbrough equalised with a header from Kieron Dyer but three minutes later, Darren Deadman awarded a penalty to Bolton after Jonathan Woodgate brought down Lee Chung-yong. Marvin Sordell scored the penalty to give Bolton the win. Woodgate was later given a second caution and was sent off for pulling back Marvin Sordell.

Bolton's final match of the month and penultimate match of the season came against champions Cardiff City. Chris Eagles side-footed in the opener in the 18th minute, sending Bolton into half-time 1–0 up. However, winger Craig Noone, who also scored in the reverse fixture, levelled the scores with a free-kick in the 68th minute. Dougie Freedman was named as manager of the month for April.

=== May ===
On the final day of the season, Bolton faced Blackpool, who had confirmed their safety the previous weekend. Needing a win to all but confirm a play-off place, Bolton fell behind to goals from Matt Phillips and Ludovic Sylvestre, while Nottingham Forest and Leicester City were drawing 1–1. Bolton pulled it back level with two quick-fire goals in injury time of the first half, the first Chris Eagles' 12th goal of the season and the second a deflected Craig Davies shot. However, a 90th-minute winner for Leicester City meant that the draw was not enough as Leicester overtook them into sixth place.

=== Matches ===
18 August 2012	Burnley	2–0	Bolton Wanderers	Burnley
15:00 BST	Paterson 39'; Austin 57'	Report		Stadium: Turf Moor; Attendance: 18,407; Referee: Jonathan Moss

21 August 2012	Bolton Wanderers	2–0	Derby County	Horwich
20:00 BST	K. Davies 77'; Eagles 90+1'	Report		Stadium: Reebok Stadium; Attendance: 17,050; Referee: Craig Pawson

24 August 2012	Bolton Wanderers	2–2	Nottingham Forest	Horwich
19:45 BST	Eagles 39'; Sordell 49'	Report	McGugan 15'; Reid 57'	Stadium: Reebok Stadium; Attendance: 17,361; Referee: Dean Whitestone

1 September 2012	Hull City	3–1	Bolton Wanderers	Hull
15:00 BST	Aluko 29'; Faye 46'; Quinn 49'	Report	Eagles 17'	Stadium: KC Stadium; Attendance: 15,304; Referee: Martin Sarginson

15 September 2012	Bolton Wanderers	2–1	Watford	Horwich
15:00 BST	Mills 3'; K. Davies 42'	Report	Doyley 58'	Stadium: Reebok Stadium; Attendance: 16,608; Referee: Eddie Ilderton

18 September 2012	Birmingham City	2–1	Bolton Wanderers	Bordesley
19:45 BST	Lita 16'; King 48' (pen.)	Report	Eagles 44'	Stadium: St Andrew's; Attendance: 14,693; Referee: Carl Boyeson

22 September 2012	Sheffield Wednesday	1–2	Bolton Wanderers	Sheffield
15:00 BST	Barkley 62' (pen.)	Report	Alonso 44'; M. Davies 65'	Stadium: Hillsborough; Attendance: 26,598; Referee: Keith Stroud

29 September 2012	Bolton Wanderers	0–1	Crystal Palace	Horwich
15:00 BST		Report	Murray 80' (pen.)	Stadium: Reebok Stadium; Attendance: 16,727; Referee: Geoff Eltrigham

2 October 2012	Bolton Wanderers	2–2	Leeds United	Horwich
20:00 BST	K. Davies 14', 79'	Report	Byram 44'; Becchio 50' (pen.)	Stadium: Reebok Stadium; Attendance: 21,255; Referee: Phil Dowd

7 October 2012	Millwall	2–1	Bolton Wanderers	Bermondsey
15:00 BST	Henderson 17', 90'	Report	Eagles 50'	Stadium: The Den; Attendance: 10,116; Referee: Gavin Ward

20 October 2012	Bolton Wanderers	3–2	Bristol City	Horwich
15:00 BST	Eagles 31'; Spearing 62'; Petrov 82'	Report	S. Davies 3', 21' (pen.)	Stadium: Reebok Stadium; Attendance: 17,259; Referee: Mark Brown

23 October 2012	Wolverhampton Wanderers	2–2	Bolton Wanderers	Wolverhampton
19:45 BST	Doyle 27', 30'	Report	Afobe 21'; M. Davies 90'	Stadium: Molineux; Attendance: 20,915; Referee: Lee Probert

27 October 2012	Middlesbrough	2–1	Bolton Wanderers	Middlesbrough
15:00 BST	McDonald 67', 85'	Report	Lee 42'	Stadium: Riverside Stadium; Attendance: 16,200; Referee: Gary Sutton

3 November 2012	Bolton Wanderers	2–1	Cardiff City	Horwich
17:20 GMT	Petrov 69' (pen.); Ngog 74', (yellow card) 90+1' (yellow-red card)	Report	Noone 40'	Stadium: Reebok Stadium; Attendance: 17,304; Referee: Anthony Bates

6 November 2012	Bolton Wanderers	0–0	Leicester City	Horwich
20:00 GMT		Report		Stadium: Reebok Stadium; Attendance: 16,754; Referee: Martin Atkinson

10 November 2012	Blackpool	2–2	Bolton Wanderers	Blackpool
15:00 GMT	Ince 19'; Delfouneso 81'	Report	M. Davies 16'; Lee 71'	Stadium: Bloomfield Road; Attendance: 15,525; Referee: Jonathan Moss

17 November 2012	Bolton Wanderers	1–1	Barnsley	Horwich
15:00 GMT	K. Davies 24'	Report	C. Davies 65'	Stadium: Reebok Stadium; Attendance: 16,965; Referee: Craig Berry

24 November 2012	Brighton & Hove Albion	1–1	Bolton Wanderers	Brighton
15:00 GMT	Bruno 54'	Report	Ngog 90+6'	Stadium: Amex Stadium; Attendance: 26,455; Referee: Mark Haywood

28 November 2012	Blackburn Rovers	1–2	Bolton Wanderers	Blackburn
19:45 GMT	Rhodes 82'	Report	K. Davies 2'; Lee 61'	Stadium: Ewood Park; Attendance: 18,010; Referee: Stuart Attwell

1 December 2012	Bolton Wanderers	1–2	Ipswich Town	Horwich
15:00 GMT	M. Davies 6'	Report	Campbell 70' (pen.); Chopra 90'	Stadium: Reebok Stadium; Attendance: 17,208; Referee: Michael Naylor

8 December 2012	Huddersfield Town	2–2	Bolton Wanderers	Huddersfield
15:00 GMT	Knight 9' (o.g.); Vaughan 87'	Report	M. Davies 70'; Eagles 80'	Stadium: John Smith's Stadium; Attendance: 16,372; Referee: Eddie Ilderton

15 December 2012	Bolton Wanderers	2–0	Charlton Athletic	Horwich
15:00 GMT	Ngog 74', 80'	Report		Stadium: Reebok Stadium; Attendance: 15,991; Referee: Kevin Wright

22 December 2012	Peterborough United	5–4	Bolton Wanderers	Peterborough
15:00 GMT	Tomlin 2'; Gayle 6'; Thorne 47'; Little 69'; Zakuani 83'	Report	Andrews 45+3' (pen.), 56' (pen.); Afobe 85'; Petrov 87'	Stadium: London Road; Attendance: 6,600; Referee: Nigel Miller

26 December 2012	Bolton Wanderers	0–1	Sheffield Wednesday	Horwich
15:00 GMT		Report	Sidibé 25'	Stadium: Reebok Stadium; Attendance: 22,292; Referee: Scott Mathieson

29 December 2012	Bolton Wanderers	3–1	Birmingham City	Horwich
15:00 GMT	Alonso 27'; Lee 33'; Andrews 79' (pen.)	Report	Žigić 11'	Stadium: Reebok Stadium; Attendance: 17,068; Referee: Simon Hooper

1 January 2013	Leeds United	1–0	Bolton Wanderers	Leeds
15:00 GMT	Becchio 66' (pen.)	Report		Stadium: Elland Road; Attendance: 22,386; Referee: Phil Gibbs

12 January 2013	Bolton Wanderers	1–1	Millwall	Horwich
15:00 GMT	Andrews 34' (pen.)	Report	Keogh 9' (pen.)	Stadium: Reebok Stadium; Attendance: 16,985; Referee: Bobby Madley

19 January 2013	Crystal Palace	0–0	Bolton Wanderers	Selhurst
15:00 GMT		Report		Stadium: Selhurst Park; Attendance: 17,033; Referee: Bobby Madley

2 February 2013	Watford	2–1	Bolton Wanderers	Watford
15:00 GMT	Vydra 36'; Abdi 70'	Report	Sordell 32' (pen.)	Stadium: Vicarage Road; Attendance: 13,223; Referee: James Adcock

9 February 2013	Bolton Wanderers	2–1	Burnley	Horwich
15:00 GMT	C. Davies 66'; Ngog 81'	Report	Edgar 55'	Stadium: Reebok Stadium; Attendance: 19,767; Referee: Chris Foy

16 February 2013	Nottingham Forest	1–1	Bolton Wanderers	West Bridgford
15:00 GMT	Reid 59'	Report	C. Davies 77'; Alonso (yellow card) 80' (yellow-red card)	Stadium: City Ground; Attendance: 24,409; Referee: Keith Stroud

19 February 2013	Derby County	1–1	Bolton Wanderers	Derby
19:45 GMT	Ward 81'	Report	Keogh 45' (o.g.)	Stadium: Pride Park; Attendance: 22,145; Referee: Gavin Ward

23 February 2013	Bolton Wanderers	4–1	Hull City	Horwich
15:00 GMT	Pratley 2'; M. Davies 5'; Dawson 8', 70'	Report	Brady 68'	Stadium: Reebok Stadium; Attendance: 17,655; Referee: Andy Haines

26 February 2013	Bolton Wanderers	1–0	Peterborough United	Horwich
15:00 GMT	Dawson 5'	Report		Stadium: Reebok Stadium; Attendance: 15,675; Referee: Andy D'Urso

2 March 2013	Barnsley	2–3	Bolton Wanderers	Barnsley
15:00 GMT	Cywka 47'; O'Grady 53'	Report	Ngog 15'; Spearing 38'; Dawson 59'	Stadium: Oakwell; Attendance: 10,862; Referee: Lee Collins

5 March 2013	Bolton Wanderers	1–0	Blackburn Rovers	Horwich
20:00 GMT	Eagles 90+3'	Report		Stadium: Reebok Stadium; Attendance: 19,063; Referee: Robert Madley

9 March 2013	Bolton Wanderers	1–0	Brighton & Hove Albion	Horwich
15:00 GMT	Alonso 20'	Report		Stadium: Reebok Stadium; Attendance: 17,599; Referee: Nigel Miller

16 March 2013	Ipswich Town	1–0	Bolton Wanderers	Ipswich
15:00 GMT	Edwards 88'	Report		Stadium: Portman Road; Attendance: 17,034; Referee: Stuart Attwell

30 March 2013	Charlton Athletic	3–2	Bolton Wanderers	Charlton
15:00 GMT	Jackson 25'; Dervite 60'; Kermorgant 63' (pen.)	Report	Sordell 4'; Medo 20'; Ricketts (yellow card) 58' (yellow-red card); C. Davies (yellow card) 90+8' (yellow-red card)	Stadium: The Valley; Attendance: 17,322; Referee: Trevor Kettle

2 April 2013	Bolton Wanderers	1–0	Huddersfield Town	Horwich
20:00 BST	Eagles 58'	Report		Stadium: Reebok Stadium; Attendance: 16,500; Referee: David Webb

6 April 2013	Bolton Wanderers	2–0	Wolverhampton Wanderers	Bolton
15:00 BST	Ngog 3'; Alonso 10'	Report		Stadium: Reebok Stadium; Attendance: 18,432; Referee: Andy D'Urso

13 April 2013	Bristol City	1–2	Bolton Wanderers	Bristol
15:00 BST	S. Davies 49'	Report	Fontaine 2' (o.g.); C. Davies 79' (pen.)	Stadium: Ashton Gate; Attendance: 12,935; Referee: Mark Haywood

16 April 2013	Leicester City	3–2	Bolton Wanderers	Leicester
19:45 BST	Wood 39' (pen.); Dyer 41'; Schlupp 79'	Report	Ngog 3' (pen.); Pratley 71'	Stadium: King Power Stadium; Attendance: 22,442; Referee: Eddie Ilderton

20 April 2013	Bolton Wanderers	2–1	Middlesbrough	Horwich
15:00 BST	Eagles 50'; Sordell 59' (pen.)	Report	Dyer 56'	Stadium: Reebok Stadium; Attendance: 18,420; Referee: Darren Deadman

27 April 2013	Cardiff City	1–1	Bolton Wanderers	Cardiff
15:00 BST	Noone 68'	Report	Eagles 18'	Stadium: Cardiff City Stadium; Attendance: 26,418; Referee: Michael Naylor

4 May 2013	Bolton Wanderers	2–2	Blackpool	Horwich
12:45 BST	Eagles 45+2'; C. Davies 45+4'	Report	Phillips 21'; Sylvestre 35'	Stadium: Reebok Stadium; Attendance: 24,844; Referee: Roger East

==== Table ====
Pos	Team	Pld	W	D	L	GF	GA	GD	Pts	Promotion or relegation
5	Crystal Palace (O, P)	46	19	15	12	73	62	+11	72	Qualification for Championship play-offs
6	Leicester City	46	19	11	16	71	48	+23	68	Qualification for Championship play-offs
7	Bolton Wanderers	46	18	14	14	69	61	+8	68	
8	Nottingham Forest	46	17	16	13	63	59	+4	67	
9	Charlton Athletic	46	17	14	15	65	59	+6	65	

Updated to match(es) played on 4 May 2013. Source: BBC Sport
Rules for classification: 1) points; 2) goal difference; 3) number of goals scored.
(O) Play-off winners; (P) Promoted

== FA Cup ==
Bolton entered the 2012–13 FA Cup at the Third Round stage with the other Championship clubs, as well as those from the Premier League. The draw was made on 2 December 2012 by former Bolton player Fabrice Muamba and Ledley King; Bolton were drawn against Premier League team Sunderland at the Reebok Stadium. Bolton took a 2–0 lead with goals from Lee Chung-yong and Marvin Sordell, but Sunderland fought back for a draw through Connor Wickham and Craig Gardner, meaning there will be a replay at the Stadium of Light. Bolton won the replay 2–0, with both goals coming from Marvin Sordell; his first from the penalty spot. Stuart Holden played only his second match since being injured by Jonny Evans in March 2011. Facing Everton in the next round, Bolton went 1–0 down in the 18th minute to a Steven Pienaar goal, before Marvin Sordell scored his fourth goal in the competition to equalise. However, in the first minute of stoppage time, substitute John Heitinga scored from the edge of the penalty area to send Bolton out of the FA Cup.

5 January 2013 R3	Bolton Wanderers	2–2	Sunderland	Horwich
15:00	Lee 12'; Sordell 48'	Report	Wickham 60'; Gardner 75'	Stadium: Reebok Stadium; Attendance: 12,204; Referee: Mike Jones

15 January 2013 R3 Replay	Sunderland	0–2	Bolton Wanderers	Sunderland
19:45 GMT		Report	Sordell 64' (pen.), 73'	Stadium: Stadium of Light; Attendance: 17,505; Referee: Kevin Friend

26 January 2013 R4	Bolton Wanderers	1–2	Everton	Horwich
15:00 GMT	Sordell 27'	Report	Pienaar 18'; Heitinga 90'	Stadium: Reebok Stadium; Attendance: 18,760; Referee: Martin Atkinson

== League Cup ==
Bolton entered the League Cup at the Second Round stage alongside Blackburn Rovers, as both clubs were given a bye meaning they would avoid playing in the first round, along with those Premier League clubs not involved in European competition. on 15 August, Bolton were drawn away at Crawley Town. This will be the first competitive fixture between the clubs. Bolton took the lead in the first half when Benik Afobe scored his first goal from the club but two late goals from Billy Clarke and Nicky Ajose in the last ten minutes gave Crawley a 2–1 win and knocked Bolton out of the League Cup.

28 August 2012 R2	Crawley Town	2–1	Bolton Wanderers	Crawley
19:45	Clarke 81'; Ajose 90+2'	Report	Afobe 21'	Stadium: Broadfield Stadium; Attendance: 2,678; Referee: Graham Scott

== Squad statistics ==
No.	Pos.	Name	League		FA Cup		League Cup		Total		Discipline	
No.	Pos.	Name	Apps	Goals	Apps	Goals	Apps	Goals	Apps	Goals	Yellow card	Red card
1	GK	(Hungary) Ádám Bogdán	41	0	0	0	0	0	41	0	2	0
2	DF	(England) Tyrone Mears	26	0	2	0	0	0	28	0	6	0
3	DF	(Spain) Marcos Alonso	26	4	3	0	1	0	30	4	8	1
4	DF	(England) Matt Mills	18	1	0	0	0	0	18	1	1	0
5	DF	(United States) Tim Ream	15	0	1	0	1	0	17	0	0	0
7	MF	(England) Chris Eagles	43	12	3	0	1	0	46	12	3	0
8	MF	(Republic of Ireland) Keith Andrews	25	4	1	0	1	0	27	4	5	0
9	FW	(France) David Ngog	31	8	2	0	0	0	33	8	1	1
10	MF	(Bulgaria) Martin Petrov	14	3	1	0	1	0	16	3	0	0
11	MF	(Scotland) Gregg Wylde	0	0	0	0	0	0	0	0	0	0
12	DF	(England) Zat Knight	43	0	3	0	1	0	47	0	8	0
14	FW	(England) Kevin Davies	35	6	2	0	1	0	38	6	5	0
15	DF	(England) Stephen Warnock	15	0	0	0	0	0	15	0	4	0
15	DF	(England) Craig Dawson	16	4	0	0	0	0	16	4	2	0
16	MF	(England) Mark Davies	24	6	0	0	1	0	25	6	6	0
17	FW	(England) Benik Afobe	20	2	2	0	1	1	23	3	1	0
17	FW	(England) Robert Hall	1	0	0	0	0	0	1	0	0	0
18	DF	(Wales) Sam Ricketts	32	0	3	0	0	0	35	0	5	1
19	FW	(England) Marvin Sordell	22	4	3	4	1	0	26	8	2	0
20	MF	(England) Jay Spearing	37	2	2	0	0	0	39	2	7	0
21	MF	(England) Darren Pratley	31	2	3	0	1	0	35	2	10	0
22	MF	(United States) Stuart Holden	2	0	2	0	0	0	4	0	0	0
23	DF	(England) Joe Riley	0	0	1	0	1	0	2	0	0	0
24	GK	(England) Andy Lonergan	5	0	3	0	1	0	9	0	0	0
25	MF	(England) Josh Vela	4	0	2	0	1	0	7	0	0	0
26	GK	(England) Rob Lainton	0	0	0	0	0	0	0	0	0	0
27	MF	(South Korea) Lee Chung-yong	41	4	3	1	0	0	44	5	4	0
28	FW	(Wales) Craig Davies	18	4	0	0	0	0	18	4	3	1
28	DF	(England) Andy Kellett	0	0	0	0	0	0	0	0	0	0
29	MF	(England) Jacob Butterfield	8	0	0	0	0	0	8	0	2	0
29	MF	(Slovakia) Ján Greguš	0	0	0	0	0	0	0	0	0	0
30	FW	(Scotland) Michael O'Halloran	0	0	0	0	0	0	0	0	0	0
31	DF	(England) David Wheater	4	0	0	0	0	0	4	0	0	0
32	FW	(England) Tom Eaves	3	0	0	0	0	0	3	0	0	0
33	MF	(England) Adam Blakeman	0	0	0	0	0	0	0	0	0	0
34	GK	(England) Jay Lynch	0	0	0	0	0	0	0	0	0	0
35	MF	(Scotland) Joe McKee	0	0	0	0	0	0	0	0	0	0
36	DF	(Republic of Ireland) Cian Bolger	0	0	0	0	0	0	0	0	0	0
37	FW	(England) Jack Sampson	0	0	0	0	0	0	0	0	0	0
38	FW	(England) Sanmi Odelusi	1	0	0	0	0	0	1	0	0	0
39	DF	(England) Alex McQuade	0	0	0	0	0	0	0	0	0	0
40	FW	(England) Zach Clough	0	0	0	0	0	0	0	0	0	0
41	MF	(England) Chris Lester	0	0	0	0	0	0	0	0	0	0
42	MF	(Belgium) Steve De Ridder	3	0	0	0	0	0	3	0	1	0
43	DF	(England) Danny Butterfield	6	0	0	0	0	0	6	0	0	0
44	MF	(Sierra Leone) Medo	12	1	0	0	0	0	12	1	0	0
–	–	Own goals	–	2	–	0	–	0	–	2		

Statistics accurate as of match played 4 May 2013

== Transfers ==
=== Summer ===
At the end of the 2011–12 season, the club confirmed that they had released seven first-team players, along with reserve-team players Mark Connolly, Rhys Bennett, Tope Obadeyi, Tom Eckersley and Dino Fazlić. Among those released was Ricardo Gardner, who had been with the club since 1998, and was the second longest-serving player in the squad. Midfielder Nigel Reo-Coker invoked a clause in his contract which allowed him to leave, as the club had been relegated. Bolton had also offered Zat Knight and Jussi Jääskeläinen new contracts, but at the end of May, Jääskeläinen declined the contract offer and left the club after 15 years, leaving striker Kevin Davies as the club's longest-serving player. Jääskeläinen would later join former Bolton manager Sam Allardyce at West Ham United.

Bolton's first signing of the pre-season was made on 29 June, with free agent Keith Andrews joining. Matt Mills followed him into the club on 4 July, signing from Leicester City for an undisclosed fee. Joe McKee became Bolton's third signing reuniting with Owen Coyle who had bought him for Burnley three years prior. On 17 July, Bolton strengthened their goalkeeping line up with the signing of Andrew Lonergan from Leeds United, again for an undisclosed fee. Bolton's first signing of August saw Benik Afobe sign on a season long loan from Arsenal, but in January 2013, it was cut short by five months as Arsenal recalled him from his loan. On transfer deadline day, Jay Spearing joined from Liverpool on a season's long loan, while Michael O'Halloran joined Carlisle United for a month. However, he returned twelve days later.

Bolton made their first signing of the loan transfer window on 21 September by bringing in Aston Villa defender Stephen Warnock on a three-month loan. Six days later, reserve striker Tom Eaves joined Bristol Rovers on a three-month loan deal. Another reserve team striker, Jack Sampson, joined Accrington Stanley on a one-month loan deal on 11 October. Bolton signed Jacob Butterfield on a one months loan deal from Norwich City on 8 November. The loan deal was extended for another Month on 10 December. On 22 November, loan transfer deadline day, Gregg Wylde joined nearby Bury for a month whilst O'Halloran went on loan again, this time to Tranmere Rovers. O'Halloran's loan was extended for another month in January which was then extended until the end of the season on deadline day.

=== Winter ===
Bolton's first action of the January transfer window was to bring in Welsh international Craig Davies from Barnsley for £300,000. On 14 January, Bolton allowed Martin Petrov to join Spanish Team Espanyol for free. Bolton followed this with the signings of England under-21 international Craig Dawson on loan from West Bromwich Albion (three months) and Slovakia under-21 international Ján Greguš on loan from Czech side Baník Ostrava (a year). Bolton had a busy transfer deadline day, 31 January, as they started by making the signing of young defender Cian Bolger from Leicester City on a three-and-a-half-year deal, but the manager Dougie Freedman confirmed he would start in the development squad. Then, it was confirmed that Bolton had made the signing of Steve De Ridder on loan from Southampton (one-month initially), and followed it up with the signing of Sierra Leone defensive midfielder Medo from Serbian club Partizan on a three-and-a-half-year deal. It was also announced that Benik Afobe had gone back to his parent club Arsenal after Bolton cut his loan deal short.

The first deal of the new loan window took place on 21 February and saw Tom Eaves go out for his second loan spell of the season, this time an initial one-month deal to Shrewsbury Town which was later extended for another month. On 28 March, Bolton loaned out Stuart Holden to Sheffield Wednesday for a month and loaned in Robert Hall from West Ham until the end of the season and manager Dougie Freedman's former Crystal Palace teammate Danny Butterfield from Southampton on an emergency loan deal until 4 May.

In
Date	Pos.	Name	From	Fee
1 July 2012	MF	(Republic of Ireland) Keith Andrews	(England) West Bromwich Albion	Free
4 July 2012	DF	(England) Matt Mills	(England) Leicester City	£2,250,000
5 July 2012	MF	(Scotland) Joe McKee	(England) Burnley	Free
17 July 2012	GK	(England) Andy Lonergan	(England) Leeds United	£288,000
9 January 2013	FW	(Wales) Craig Davies	(England) Barnsley	£331,000
31 January 2013	DF	(Republic of Ireland) Cian Bolger	(England) Leicester City	Undisclosed
31 January 2013	MF	(Sierra Leone) Medo	(Serbia) Partizan	Undisclosed

Out
Date	Pos.	Name	To	Fee
18 May 2012	MF	(Jamaica) Ricardo Gardner	Released	Free
18 May 2012	DF	(Iceland) Grétar Steinsson	(Turkey) Kayserispor	Free
18 May 2012	FW	(Croatia) Ivan Klasnić	(Germany) Mainz 05	Free
18 May 2012	MF	(England) Nigel Reo-Coker	(England) Ipswich Town	Free
18 May 2012	DF	(England) Paul Robinson	(England) Birmingham City	Free
18 May 2012	MF	(England) Sean Davis	Released	Free
18 May 2012	FW	(England) Robbie Blake	(England) Doncaster Rovers	Free
18 May 2012	DF	(Republic of Ireland) Mark Connolly	(England) Crawley Town	Free
18 May 2012	FW	(England) Tope Obadeyi	(Portugal) Rio Ave	Free
18 May 2012	DF	(England) Rhys Bennett	(England) Rochdale	Free
18 May 2012	MF	(Bosnia and Herzegovina) Dino Fazlić	Released	Free
18 May 2012	DF	(England) Tom Eckersley	(England) Accrington Stanley	Free
30 May 2012	GK	(Finland) Jussi Jääskeläinen	(England) West Ham United	Free
14 January 2013	MF	(Bulgaria) Martin Petrov	(Spain) Espanyol	Free
30 April 2013	DF	(England) Alex McQuade	(England) Shrewsbury Town	Free

Loan in
Date from	Date to	Pos.	Name	From
3 August 2012	31 January 2013	FW	(England) Benik Afobe	(England) Arsenal
31 August 2012	30 June 2013	MF	(England) Jay Spearing	(England) Liverpool
21 September 2012	22 December 2012	DF	(England) Stephen Warnock	(England) Aston Villa
8 November 2012	5 January 2013	MF	(England) Jacob Butterfield	(England) Norwich City
25 January 2013	27 April 2013	DF	(England) Craig Dawson	(England) West Brom
25 January 2013	January 2014	MF	(Slovakia) Ján Greguš	(Czech Republic) Baník Ostrava
31 January 2013	3 March 2013	MF	(Belgium) Steve De Ridder	(England) Southampton
28 March 2013	30 June 2013	FW	(England) Robert Hall	(England) West Ham United
28 March 2013	4 May 2013	DF	(England) Danny Butterfield	(England) Southampton

Loan out
Date from	Date to	Pos.	Name	To
31 August 2012	11 September 2012	FW	(Scotland) Michael O'Halloran	(England) Carlisle United
27 September 2012	31 December 2012	FW	(England) Tom Eaves	(England) Bristol Rovers
11 October 2012	11 November 2012	FW	(England) Jack Sampson	(England) Accrington Stanley
22 November 2012	22 January 2013	MF	(Scotland) Gregg Wylde	(England) Bury
22 November 2012	30 June 2013	FW	(Scotland) Michael O'Halloran	(England) Tranmere Rovers
21 February 2013	15 April 2013	FW	(England) Tom Eaves	(England) Shrewsbury Town
28 March 2013	24 April 2013	MF	(United States) Stuart Holden	(England) Sheffield Wednesday
