= Darren Pratley =

English footballer

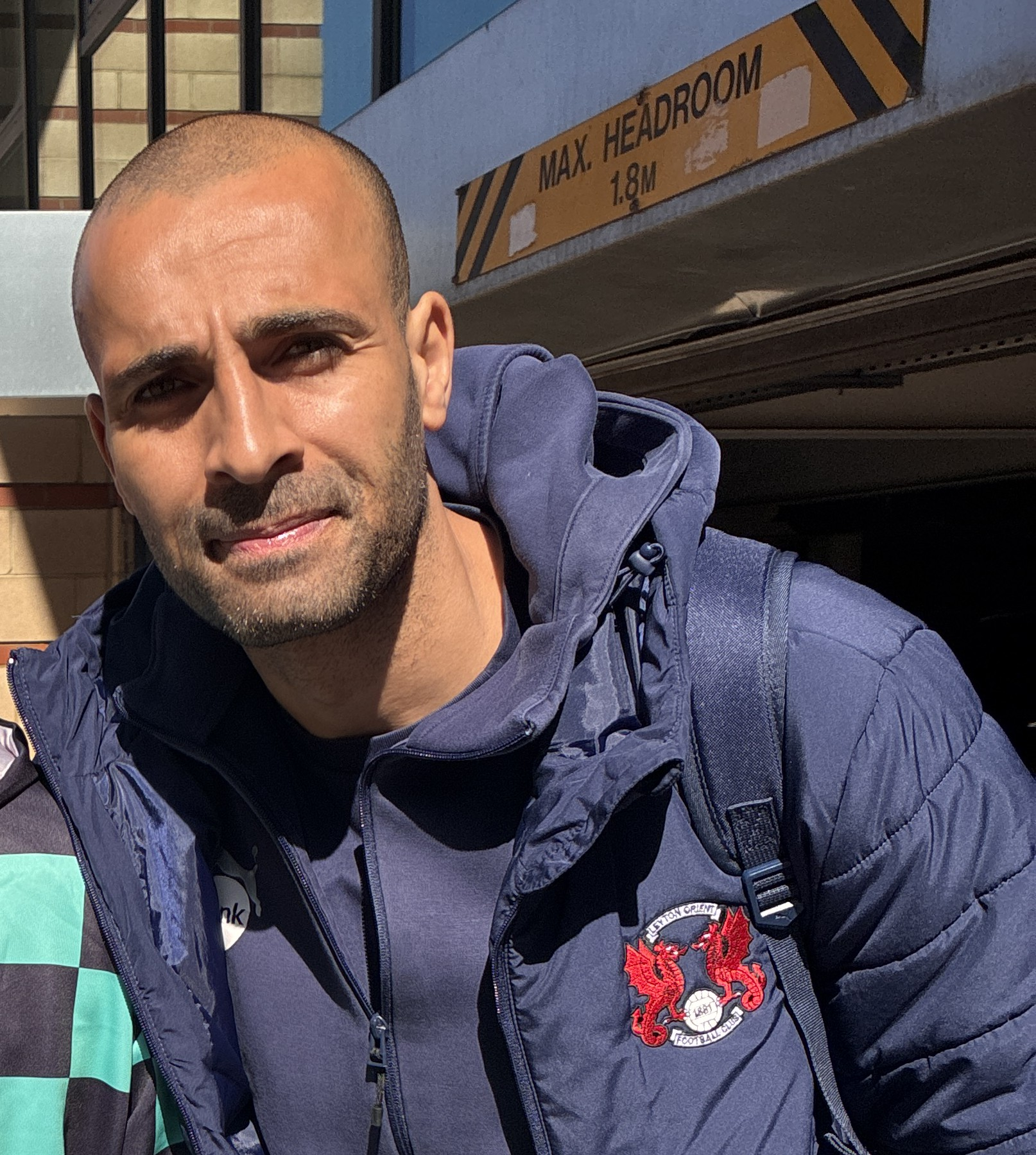
- Pratley in 2026

Personal information
- Full name: Darren Antony Pratley
- Date of birth: 22 April 1985 (age 41)
- Place of birth: Barking, England
- Height: 6 ft 0 in (1.83 m)
- Position: Midfielder

Team information
- Current team: Leyton Orient (first-team coach)

Youth career
- –2002: Fulham

Senior career*
Years	Team	Apps	(Gls)
2002–2006	Fulham	1	(0)
2005–2006	→ Brentford (loan)	50	(5)
2006–2011	Swansea City	177	(26)
2011–2018	Bolton Wanderers	178	(12)
2018–2021	Charlton Athletic	103	(5)
2021–2025	Leyton Orient	142	(2)
Total		651	(50)
- * Club domestic league appearances and goals

Darren Antony Pratley (born 22 April 1985) is a former English professional footballer who played as a midfielder. He is currently a first-team coach at EFL League One club Leyton Orient.

== Club career ==
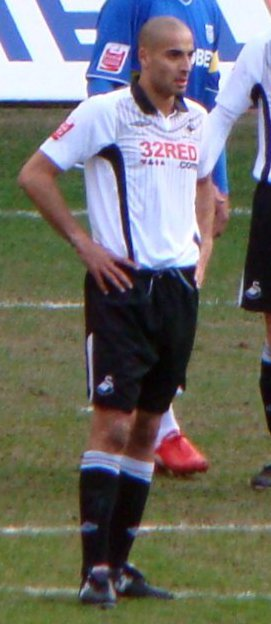
Pratley playing for Swansea in 2010

=== Fulham ===
Starting his career at Fulham after signing from local rivals Arsenal, Pratley signed his first professional contract with the club in 2002. He made his professional football debut in a League Cup match at Wigan Athletic on 23 September 2003, coming on as a substitute for Andrejs Stolcers, as Fulham went on to lose 1–0. Pratley made his league debut against Charlton Athletic on 8 November 2003, again as a substitute, this time for Barry Hayles, as the club went on to lose 3–1. These turned out to be the only two matches he would play for Fulham. At the end of the 2003–04 season, Pratley signed a two-year contract with the club, which will keep him until 2006.

==== Brentford (loans) ====
Having spent the latter parts of the 2004–05 season on loan at Brentford, on 30 August 2005 Pratley moved back to the Bees until January 2006 on a loan period that was subsequently extended until the end of the 2005–06 season.

=== Swansea City ===
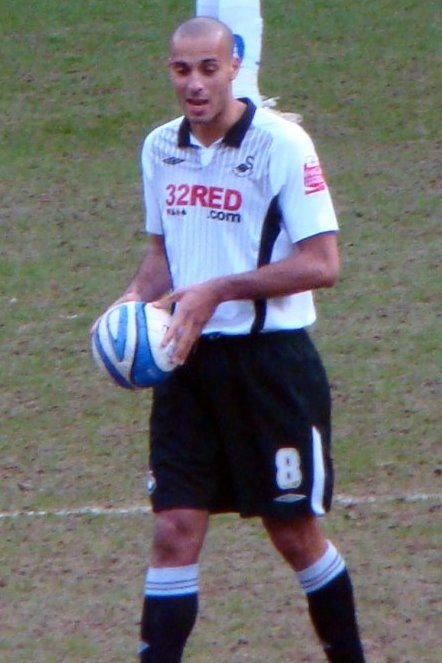
Pratley playing for Swansea City.

On 8 June 2006, Pratley was sold by Fulham to Swansea City for a fee of £100,000. Upon joining the club, manager Kenny Jackett said: "Darren's a player I've admired for some time, so it's pleasing to have finally got him. A year ago he was hoping to impress Fulham enough to figure in their first-team plans, but he now realises he has got to move on in order to progress his career. Recently, we've been trying to sign young, athletic players who we view as good investments and Darren falls into that category. A hundred thousand pounds is a lot of money, but I certainly feel he's worth it."

On 7 November 2009, Pratley scored a brace against their arch-rivals Cardiff City. Pratley had not scored for 26 matches since the previous season's corresponding fixture at the Liberty Stadium but he proved Swansea's hero on the hour to seal the win. Pratley went on to score a further three times before the end of 2009, against Sheffield Wednesday (twice) and Reading. He started off the 2010–11 season well, however a string of poor performances saw him dropped by manager Brendan Rodgers. Pratley came back into the team performing well and getting vital goals against Reading, Crystal Palace, a double against Bristol City, and the third goal in the Championship play-off semi-final second leg against Nottingham Forest which he scored from the halfway-line into an empty goal. On 9 June 2011, it was confirmed that Pratley would leave Swansea City, having rejected a new contract.

=== Bolton Wanderers ===
Pratley signed for Bolton Wanderers on 1 July 2011 on a four-year deal. He made his debut when coming on as a substitute for Nigel Reo-Coker in Bolton's match at Queens Park Rangers on 13 August and scored his first goal for the club in their 2–1 victory over his former club Swansea City in the FA Cup on 28 January 2012. He scored his first Premier League goal in the match against Queens Park Rangers at the Reebok Stadium on 10 March in Bolton's 2–1 win. On 3 August 2013, the first day of the 2013–14 season, Pratley scored the equaliser in a 1–1 draw with Burnley. He then also scored in a 1–1 draw with Reading a week later. On 1 July 2015, Pratley signed a new-three-year contract that will keep him at Bolton Wanderers until the summer of 2018.

A few weeks later Pratley was appointed as the new club captain of Bolton, replacing Matt Mills who had departed earlier that summer for Nottingham Forest. He played the first match of the 2016–17 season, picking up an injury that ruled him out for seven months. When he was due to return in January, a further setback ruled him out for the rest of the season. Pratley managed to return earlier than expected and started in Bolton's 4–2 win over Fleetwood Town on 11 March. He was released by Bolton at the end of the 2017–18 season.

=== Charlton Athletic ===
On 17 July 2018, Pratley signed a two-year deal with Charlton Athletic. In the 2018–19 season, he played an important part in Charlton's playoff promotion winning campaign, scoring a crucial late goal in the play-off semi-final against Doncaster Rovers. At the end of the 2020–21 season, Pratley was not offered a new contract. On 18 May 2021, it was announced that he would leave Charlton Athletic at the end of his contract.

=== Leyton Orient ===
On 9 June 2021, Pratley agreed to join League Two side Leyton Orient, signing a one-year deal with the club, active from the end of his contract with Charlton. Having previously worked with manager Kenny Jackett at Swansea City, Pratley was appointed captain.

Pratley's contract was extended in 2022 and on 13 May 2024, the club announced he had agreed another one-year deal.

On 2 June 2025, the club said it would not offer the player a new contract.

== International career ==
On 16 January 2009, Pratley was called up to the Jamaican squad by coach John Barnes to face Nigeria on 11 February 2009. Pratley qualified for Jamaica through his grandparents. He did not represent the Reggae Boyz after pulling out of the squad for the Nigeria friendly through injury after he broke his shoulder in a 4–1 win over Preston North End.

== Coaching career ==
In June 2026, having been under-21s coach with Leyton Orient since his retirement the previous year, he was promoted to the role of first-team coach.

== Career statistics ==
As of 26 April 2025

Appearances and goals by club, season and competition
Club	Season	League			FA Cup		League Cup		Other		Total	
Club	Season	Division	Apps	Goals	Apps	Goals	Apps	Goals	Apps	Goals	Apps	Goals
Fulham	2003–04	Premier League	1	0	0	0	1	0	—		2	0
Brentford (loan)	2004–05	League One	16	1	0	0	0	0	0	0	16	1
Brentford (loan)	2005–06	League One	34	4	4	0	0	0	0	0	38	4
Brentford (loan)	Total		50	5	4	0	0	0	0	0	54	5
Swansea City	2006–07	League One	28	1	2	0	1	1	1 (Note: Appearance(s) in Football League / EFL Trophy)	0	32	2
Swansea City	2007–08	League One	42	5	3	1	0	0	5	0	50	6
Swansea City	2008–09	Championship	37	4	1	0	1	0	—		39	4
Swansea City	2009–10	Championship	36	7	1	0	0	0	—		37	7
Swansea City	2010–11	Championship	34	9	2	1	3	1	2 (Note: Two appearances in the Championship play-offs)	1	41	12
Swansea City	Total		177	26	9	2	5	2	8	0	199	31
Bolton Wanderers	2011–12	Premier League	25	1	4	1	3	0	—		32	2
Bolton Wanderers	2012–13	Championship	31	2	3	0	1	0	—		35	2
Bolton Wanderers	2013–14	Championship	20	2	1	0	2	0	—		23	2
Bolton Wanderers	2014–15	Championship	22	4	2	0	3	1	—		27	5
Bolton Wanderers	2015–16	Championship	36	1	3	3	0	0	—		39	4
Bolton Wanderers	2016–17	League One	12	0	0	0	0	0	0	0	12	0
Bolton Wanderers	2017–18	Championship	32	2	0	0	3	0	—		35	2
Bolton Wanderers	Total		178	12	13	4	12	1	0	0	203	17
Charlton Athletic	2018–19	League One	28	2	2	0	0	0	4 (Note: One appearance in the EFL Trophy and three in the League One play-offs)	2	34	4
Charlton Athletic	2019–20	Championship	36	2	0	0	0	0	—		36	2
Charlton Athletic	2020–21	League One	39	1	0	0	2	0	0	0	41	1
Charlton Athletic	Total		103	5	2	0	2	0	4	2	111	7
Leyton Orient	2021–22	League Two	39	1	3	0	1	0	0	0	43	1
Leyton Orient	2022–23	League Two	39	1	0	0	1	0	2	0	42	1
Leyton Orient	2023–24	League One	33	0	2	0	0	0	2	0	37	0
Leyton Orient	2024–25	League One	31	0	4	0	3	0	5	0	43	0
Leyton Orient	Total		142	2	9	0	5	0	9	0	165	2
Career total			651	50	37	6	25	3	21	3	734	62

== Honours ==
Swansea City

- Football League Championship play-offs: 2011
- Football League One: 2007–08

Bolton Wanderers

- EFL League One runner-up: 2016–17

Charlton Athletic

- EFL League One play-offs: 2019

Leyton Orient

- EFL League Two: 2022–23
