= Adam Blakeman (footballer) =

English footballer

Personal information
- Full name: Adam John Blakeman
- Date of birth: 3 December 1991 (age 34)
- Place of birth: Southport, England
- Position: Left back

Team information
- Current team: Chorley
- Number: 16

Youth career
- 2002–2009: Liverpool
- 2009–2011: Bolton Wanderers

Senior career*
Years	Team	Apps	(Gls)
2011–2013	Bolton Wanderers	0	(0)
2013–2015	Hyde	62	(8)
2015	Ayr United	14	(2)
2015–2016	Southport	28	(1)
2016–2020	Chorley	149	(13)
2020–2021	Spennymoor Town	9	(0)
2021–	Chorley	195	(12)
- * Club domestic league appearances and goals as of 22:45, 28 April 2026 (UTC)

Adam John Blakeman (born 3 December 1991) is a professional English footballer who plays for Chorley. He began his career at Bolton Wanderers, before being released at the end of the 2012–13 season. He then signed for Hyde. Blakeman plays primarily as a left back but is equally adept playing in the centre or on the left side of midfield.

== Career ==
=== Bolton Wanderers ===
Born in Southport, Blakeman started his professional career at Liverpool at the age of eleven. After seven years at the club, Blakeman left Liverpool and joined Bolton Wanderers, regularly playing in their reserve side. Blakeman signed a professional contract with Bolton in March 2011. A product of the youth system, he made his competitive debut in the League Cup tie at home to Macclesfield Town on 24 August 2011, coming on as a second-half substitute for Marcos Alonso.

He was released by Bolton at the end of the 2012–13 season.

=== Hyde ===
Blakeman signed for Conference Premier team Hyde in August 2013. He scored his first goal for the club against Forest Green Rovers in January 2014.

In January 2015, the club announced Blakeman's departure.

=== Ayr United ===
On 20 January 2015, Blakeman signed for Scottish League One club Ayr United. In explaining his decision to join the club, he cited his desire to join up again with former Bolton youth coach John Henry.

Blakeman made his debut for the club just four days after signing in a 1–1 draw against Stenhousemuir. Blakeman scored his first goals on 28 April 2015, in a 4–0 win over Stirling Albion.

At the end of the 2014–15 season, Blakeman was offered a new contract by the club.

=== Southport ===
The following season, Blakeman returned to England, where he signed for Southport, where he lined up with his brother, Liam. He made his Southport debut on 18 August 2015, playing on the left of midfield in a 2–1 loss against Gateshead. Blakeman scored his first Southport goal in a 1–0 win over Wrexham on 26 December 2015.

=== Chorley ===
Blakeman joined National League North's Chorley F.C. prior to the 2016–2017 season. On 8 October 2016, Chorley beat Harrogate Town F.C. 1–0 with Blakeman scoring a penalty to win the game. At the start of the new year, Chorley lost 3–1 against AFC Fylde, with Blakeman scoring Chorley's goal. After making it into the Promotion play-offs, their first game was at home against Kidderminster Harriers F.C. which they lost 1–0. They travelled to Kidderminster for the second leg, where a 2–0 win put them through to the play-off final against FC Halifax Town. The fixture was held on 13 May 2017, with an attendance of 7,920 fans. Chorley lost 2–1 with Blakeman scoring their only goal from a free kick.

=== Spennymoor Town ===
On 16 June 2020 Blakeman signed for Spennymoor Town.

=== Chorley ===
In May 2021 Blakeman re-signed for Chorley.

== Personal life ==
He is the grandson of Larry Carberry, who won a League Championship medal with Ipswich Town in 1962 as a member of Alf Ramsey's team that won the Second Division the previous season. His elder brother Liam, played for a number of non-league clubs including Southport and Hednesford Town.

== Career statistics ==
As of match played 23 March 2019

Appearances and goals by club, season and competition
Club	Season	League			National Cup		League Cup		Other		Total	
Club	Season	Division	Apps	Goals	Apps	Goals	Apps	Goals	Apps	Goals	Apps	Goals
Bolton Wanderers	2011–12	Premier League	0	0	—		1	0	—		1	0
Bolton Wanderers	2012–13	Championship	0	0	—		—		—		0	0
Bolton Wanderers	Bolton total		0	0	0	0	1	0	0	0	1	0
Hyde	2013–14	Conference Premier	40	5	1	0	—		1 (Note: Appearances in the FA Trophy)	0	42	5
Hyde	2014–15	Conference North	22	3	—		—		1	0	23	3
Hyde	Hyde total		62	8	1	0	0	0	2	0	65	8
Ayr United	2014–15	Scottish League One	14	2	—		—		—		14	2
Southport	2015–16	National League	28	1	—		—		3	0	31	1
Chorley	2016–17	National League North	43	3	—		—		1	0	44	3
Chorley	2017–18	National League North	38	1	3	0	—		1	0	42	1
Chorley	2018–19	National League North	33	9	3	0	—		0	0	36	9
Chorley	Chorley total		114	13	6	0	0	0	2	0	122	13
Career total			218	24	7	0	1	0	7	0	257	24

== Honours ==
Chorley

- Lancashire FA Challenge Trophy: 2017–18

Individual

- National League North Team of the Season: 2024–25
