= Yannick Bastos =

Luxembourgish international footballer

Personal information
- Date of birth: 30 May 1993 (age 33)
- Place of birth: Luxembourg
- Position: Winger

Senior career*
Years	Team	Apps	(Gls)
2009–2010	US Rumelange		
2010–2011	SV Eintracht Trier 05		
2011–2012	US Rumelange	16	(4)
2012–2014	FC Differdange 03	33	(6)
2014	Bolton Wanderers	0	(0)
2015–2018	FC Differdange 03	56	(9)
2018–2024	FC Progrès Niederkorn	118	(7)

International career^{‡}
2013–2014	Luxembourg	5	(0)
- * Club domestic league appearances and goals as of 31 May 2025 ‡ National team caps and goals as of 18:16, 17 September 2014 (UTC)

Yannick Bastos (born 30 May 1993) is a retired Luxembourgish international footballer who played as a winger.

== Career ==
Bastos spent his early career in Luxembourg and Germany, playing for US Rumelange, SV Eintracht Trier 05 and FC Differdange 03. On 31 January 2014, Bastos joined English club Bolton Wanderers for an undisclosed fee on a one-and-a-half-year contract. He was released by the club in September 2014, having never made a first-team appearance for the club.

He made his senior international debut for Luxembourg in 2013.

== Personal life ==
Bastos is of Portuguese descent.
