= Chris Lester =

Northern Irish footballer (born 1994)

Personal information
- Full name: Christopher James Lester
- Date of birth: 27 October 1994 (age 32)
- Place of birth: Salford, England
- Position: Midfielder

Team information
- Current team: Warrington Town

Senior career*
Years	Team	Apps	(Gls)
2013–2015	Bolton Wanderers	1	(0)
2013	→ Chester (loan)	5	(0)
2015–2016	Warrington Town	7	(0)
2016–2018	City of Liverpool		
2018–2019	Warrington Rylands		

International career^{‡}
2013	Northern Ireland U21	1	(0)
- * Club domestic league appearances and goals as of 17:04, 6 December 2015 (UTC) ‡ National team caps and goals as of 08:35, 23 April 2014 (UTC)

Christopher James Lester (born 27 October 1994) is a Northern Irish footballer who last played for Bolton Wanderers in the Championship as a midfielder.

== Club career ==
A youth product of the club's academy since he joined at under-14s level, Lester signed his first professional contract with the club after a good display throughout the club's academy for U18 and U21.

Lester first appeared as an unused substitute for Bolton Wanderers in a 2–2 FA Cup draw against Sunderland. Again, he was an unused substitute in a league match against Middlesbrough. A lack of first team opportunities saw him being loaned to Chester in 2013, on a one-month loan along with teammate Conor Wilkinson. He was also nominated for the Rising Star award in September 2013.

On 22 April 2014, Lester made his first team debut for Bolton, coming as a 77th-minute substitute for Chung-Yong Lee against Leicester City.

On 25 March 2015, it was announced that Lester had joined Hartlepool United on trial, scoring on his debut for the reserves.

On 15 May 2015, Chris Lester was released by Bolton along with 12 other players.

== International career ==
In May 2013, Lester was first called up by Northern Ireland U21 after being eligible to play for them through his grandfather. Lester made his Northern Ireland U21 debut on 30 May 2013, in a 3-0 loss against Cyprus U21.
