= List of English football transfers winter 2014–15 =

The 2014–15 winter transfer window for English football transfers opened on 3 January and closed on 2 February 2015. Additionally, players without a club could join at any time, clubs below Premier League level could sign players on loan at any time, and clubs could sign a goalkeeper on an emergency loan if they had no registered goalkeeper available. This list includes transfers featuring at least one Premier League or Championship club which were completed after the end of the summer 2014 transfer window and before the end of the 2014–15 winter window.

== Transfers ==
All players, and clubs without a flag are English. Note that while Cardiff City and Swansea City are affiliated with the Football Association of Wales and thus take the Welsh flag, they play in the English football league system, and so their transfers are included here.

Date	Name	Moving from	Moving to	Fee
2 September 2014	(Spain) Ángel	Unattached	Millwall	Free
3 September 2014	Andrew Johnson	Unattached	Crystal Palace	Free
9 September 2014	George Swan	Unattached	Wolverhampton Wanderers	Free
9 September 2014	Josh Wright	Millwall	Crawley Town	Loan
10 September 2014	(Republic of Ireland) Owen Garvan	Crystal Palace	Bolton Wanderers	Loan
11 September 2014	Darren Ambrose	Unattached	Ipswich Town	Free
11 September 2014	Jerome Binnom-Williams	Crystal Palace	Southend United	Loan
11 September 2014	Matthias Fanimo	West Ham United	Tranmere Rovers	Loan
11 September 2014	(Austria) Georg Margreitter	Wolverhampton Wanderers	Chesterfield	Loan
11 September 2014	(Canada) Michael Petrasso	Queens Park Rangers	Leyton Orient	Loan
11 September 2014	Joe Pigott	Charlton Athletic	(Wales) Newport County	Loan
11 September 2014	Mat Sadler	Rotherham United	Crawley Town	Loan
11 September 2014	(United States) Brek Shea	Stoke City	Birmingham City	Loan
12 September 2014	Louis Laing	Nottingham Forest	Notts County	Loan
12 September 2014	(Republic of Ireland) Conor Wilkinson	Bolton Wanderers	Oldham Athletic	Loan
15 September 2014	Jake Kean	Blackburn Rovers	Yeovil Town	Loan
16 September 2014	Callum Robinson	Aston Villa	Preston North End	Loan
16 September 2014	Freddie Woodman	Newcastle United	Hartlepool United	Loan
17 September 2014	Febian Brandy	Rotherham United	Crewe Alexandra	Loan
18 September 2014	Max Clayton	Crewe Alexandra	Bolton Wanderers	£300,000
18 September 2014	Tom Naylor	Derby County	Cambridge United	Loan
18 September 2014	Hayden White	Bolton Wanderers	Carlisle United	Loan
19 September 2014	(Poland) Artur Boruc	Southampton	Bournemouth	Loan
19 September 2014	Rhys Healey	(Wales) Cardiff City	Colchester United	Loan
19 September 2014	(Republic of Ireland) Paddy Kenny	Unattached	Bolton Wanderers	Free
19 September 2014	(Republic of Ireland) Sean Maguire	West Ham United	Accrington Stanley	Loan
19 September 2014	(Republic of Ireland) John O'Sullivan	Blackburn Rovers	Accrington Stanley	Loan
23 September 2014	(Australia) Chris Herd	Aston Villa	Bolton Wanderers	Loan
23 September 2014	Ravel Morrison	West Ham United	(Wales) Cardiff City	Loan
24 September 2014	(Republic of Ireland) Michael Drennan	Aston Villa	Portsmouth	Loan
24 September 2014	Alan Tate	(Wales) Swansea City	Crewe Alexandra	Loan
26 September 2014	David Atkinson	Middlesbrough	Hartlepool United	Loan
26 September 2014	Amari'i Bell	Birmingham City	Swindon Town	Loan
27 September 2014	Grant Holt	Wigan Athletic	Huddersfield Town	Loan
28 September 2014	Andre Blackman	Unattached	Blackpool	Free
28 September 2014	Reiss Greenidge	West Bromwich Albion	Port Vale	Loan
28 September 2014	(Republic of Ireland) Stephen McLaughlin	Nottingham Forest	Notts County	Loan
28 September 2014	(Guinea-Bissau) Formose Mendy	Unattached	Blackpool	Free
28 September 2014	(Wales) Jonny Williams	Crystal Palace	Ipswich Town	Loan
28 September 2014	(Guadeloupe) Stéphane Zubar	Bournemouth	Port Vale	Loan
30 September 2014	(Ivory Coast) Yannick Sagbo	Hull City	Wolverhampton Wanderers	Loan
2 October 2014	Jordi Hiwula	Manchester City	Yeovil Town	Loan
2 October 2014	(Republic of Ireland) Liam McAlinden	Wolverhampton Wanderers	Fleetwood Town	Loan
2 October 2014	(Australia) Ryan Williams	Wolverhampton Wanderers	Barnsley	Loan
3 October 2014	(Wales) Kieron Freeman	Derby County	Mansfield Town	Loan
3 October 2014	(Republic of Ireland) Paddy McCarthy	Crystal Palace	Sheffield United	Loan
3 October 2014	Peter Ramage	Crystal Palace	Barnsley	Loan
6 October 2014	(Wales) Elliott Hewitt	Ipswich Town	Colchester United	Loan
7 October 2014	(Australia) Jack Price	Wolverhampton Wanderers	Leyton Orient	Loan
8 October 2014	(Cameroon) Sébastien Bassong	Norwich City	Watford	Loan
9 October 2014	(Guinea-Bissau) Eusébio Bancessi	Wolverhampton Wanderers	Cheltenham Town	Loan
9 October 2014	Bobby Grant	Blackpool	Shrewsbury Town	Loan
9 October 2014	(Republic of Ireland) Michael Harriman	Queens Park Rangers	Luton Town	Loan
9 October 2014	Remie Streete	Newcastle United	Port Vale	Loan
10 October 2014	(Northern Ireland) Jamie Sendles-White	Queens Park Rangers	Mansfield Town	Loan
10 October 2014	(Republic of Ireland) Enda Stevens	Aston Villa	Northampton Town	Loan
14 October 2014	(Canada) Michael Petrasso	Queens Park Rangers	Notts County	Loan
16 October 2014	Tareiq Holmes-Dennis	Charlton Athletic	Oxford United	Loan
16 October 2014	Ryan Inniss	Crystal Palace	Yeovil Town	Loan
16 October 2014	Jack Jebb	Arsenal	Stevenage	Loan
16 October 2014	(Serbia) Miloš Veljković	Tottenham Hotspur	Middlesbrough	Loan
17 October 2014	Tom Barkhuizen	Blackpool	Morecambe	Loan
17 October 2014	(Scotland) Andy Halliday	Middlesbrough	Bradford City	Loan
17 October 2014	(Bulgaria) Georg Iliev	Bolton Wanderers	Carlisle United	Loan
17 October 2014	(Finland) Jesse Joronen	Fulham	Accrington Stanley	Loan
17 October 2014	Andy Kellett	Bolton Wanderers	Plymouth Argyle	Loan
17 October 2014	Jon Stead	Huddersfield Town	Bradford City	Loan
18 October 2014	Charlie Adams	Brentford	Stevenage	Loan
18 October 2014	Josh Clarke	Brentford	Stevenage	Loan
18 October 2014	(Scotland) Jack Grimmer	Fulham	Shrewsbury Town	Loan
18 October 2014	Connor Hunt	Everton	Blackpool	Loan
20 October 2014	Jack Butland	Stoke City	Derby County	Loan
20 October 2014	(Saint Kitts and Nevis) Harry Panayiotou	Leicester City	Port Vale	Loan
20 October 2014	Andy Wilkinson	Stoke City	Millwall	Loan
21 October 2014	Daniel Carr	Huddersfield Town	Mansfield Town	Loan
21 October 2014	Matt Crooks	Huddersfield Town	Hartlepool United	Loan
21 October 2014	(Honduras) Maynor Figueroa	Hull City	Wigan Athletic	Loan
21 October 2014	Danny Johnson	(Wales) Cardiff City	Tranmere Rovers	Loan
21 October 2014	(Republic of Ireland) Darragh Lenihan	Blackburn Rovers	Burton Albion	Loan
23 October 2014	Oscar Gobern	Huddersfield Town	Chesterfield	Loan
23 October 2014	(France) Anthony Réveillère	Unattached	Sunderland	Free
23 October 2014	Luke Williams	Middlesbrough	Scunthorpe United	Loan
24 October 2014	(Australia) Alex Cisak	Burnley	York City	Loan
24 October 2014	Courtney Duffus	Everton	Bury	Loan
24 October 2014	(Wales) Michael Doughty	Queens Park Rangers	Gillingham	Loan
24 October 2014	(Nigeria) Odion Ighalo	(Italy) Udinese	Watford	Undisclosed
25 October 2014	Gary Taylor-Fletcher	Leicester City	Sheffield Wednesday	Loan
27 October 2014	Sam Johnstone	Manchester United	Doncaster Rovers	Loan
30 October 2014	Tom Anderson	Burnley	Carlisle United	Loan
30 October 2014	Tom Ince	Hull City	Nottingham Forest	Loan
30 October 2014	Gary Madine	Sheffield Wednesday	Coventry City	Loan
30 October 2014	(Republic of Ireland) Frankie Sutherland	Queens Park Rangers	AFC Wimbledon	Loan
31 October 2014	(Oman) Ali Al-Habsi	Wigan Athletic	Brighton & Hove Albion	Loan
31 October 2014	Stephen Arthurworrey	Fulham	Yeovil Town	Loan
31 October 2014	Elliot Lee	West Ham United	Southend United	Loan
31 October 2014	Michael Morrison	Charlton Athletic	Birmingham City	Loan
31 October 2014	(United States) Oguchi Onyewu	Unattached	Charlton Athletic	Free
31 October 2014	Jed Steer	Aston Villa	Yeovil Town	Loan
1 November 2014	Elliott Bennett	Norwich City	Brighton & Hove Albion	Loan
1 November 2014	(Italy) Marcello Trotta	Fulham	Barnsley	Loan
3 November 2014	(France) Francis Coquelin	Arsenal	Charlton Athletic	Loan
3 November 2014	(Poland) Tomasz Kuszczak	Unattached	Wolverhampton Wanderers	Free
3 November 2014	Jacob Murphy	Norwich City	Blackpool	Loan
4 November 2014	Greg Halford	Nottingham Forest	Brighton & Hove Albion	Loan
4 November 2014	(Belgium) Jonathan Legear	Unattached	Blackpool	Free
4 November 2014	Kemar Roofe	West Bromwich Albion	Colchester United	Loan
5 November 2014	Jamie O'Hara	Unattached	Blackpool	Free
6 November 2014	(Republic of Ireland) Enda Stevens	Aston Villa	Doncaster Rovers	Loan
7 November 2014	(Republic of Ireland) Brian Lenihan	Hull City	Blackpool	Loan
7 November 2014	Joe Lumley	Queens Park Rangers	Morecambe	Loan
7 November 2014	(Uruguay) Diego Poyet	West Ham United	Huddersfield Town	Loan
7 November 2014	Jack Rose	West Bromwich Albion	Accrington Stanley	Loan
7 November 2014	Hayden White	Bolton Wanderers	Bury	Loan
7 November 2014	(Guadeloupe) Stéphane Zubar	Bournemouth	York City	Loan
10 November 2014	Daniel Johnson	Aston Villa	Oldham Athletic	Loan
10 November 2014	Scott Loach	Rotherham United	Bury	Loan
11 November 2014	Hallam Hope	Everton	Bury	Loan
12 November 2014	(Northern Ireland) Jamie Harney	West Ham United	Colchester United	Loan
13 November 2014	(Wales) Elliott Hewitt	Ipswich Town	Colchester United	Loan
13 November 2014	(Republic of Ireland) Paddy McCarthy	Crystal Palace	Sheffield United	Loan
13 November 2014	Liam O'Neil	West Bromwich Albion	Scunthorpe United	Loan
14 November 2014	Adam Chicksen	Brighton & Hove Albion	Gillingham	Loan
14 November 2014	Danny Graham	Sunderland	Wolverhampton Wanderers	Loan
14 November 2014	Brad Halliday	Middlesbrough	York City	Loan
14 November 2014	(Northern Ireland) Martin Paterson	Huddersfield Town	Fleetwood Town	Loan
15 November 2014	Todd Kane	Chelsea	Bristol City	Loan
15 November 2014	Ayo Obileye	Charlton Athletic	Dagenham & Redbridge	Loan
17 November 2014	(Wales) Lewis Price	Crystal Palace	Crawley Town	Loan
18 November 2014	Chris Eagles	Unattached	Blackpool	Free
18 November 2014	George Moncur	West Ham United	Colchester United	Undisclosed
19 November 2014	Lewis McGugan	Watford	Sheffield Wednesday	Loan
20 November 2014	Will Aimson	Hull City	Tranmere Rovers	Loan
20 November 2014	(Jamaica) Jermaine Beckford	Bolton Wanderers	Preston North End	Loan
20 November 2014	Matt Crooks	Huddersfield Town	Accrington Stanley	Loan
20 November 2014	(Antigua and Barbuda) Calaum Jahraldo-Martin	Hull City	Tranmere Rovers	Loan
20 November 2014	Cole Kpekawa	Queens Park Rangers	Colchester United	Loan
20 November 2014	(France) Guy Moussi	Unattached	Birmingham City	Free
21 November 2014	Adam Campbell	Newcastle United	Hartlepool United	Loan
21 November 2014	Shamir Fenelon	Brighton & Hove Albion	Tranmere Rovers	Loan
21 November 2014	Bryn Morris	Middlesbrough	Burton Albion	Loan
21 November 2014	(Jamaica) Nyron Nosworthy	Unattached	Blackpool	Free
22 November 2014	(Argentina) Emmanuel Ledesma	Middlesbrough	Rotherham United	Loan
22 November 2014	Tom Kennedy	Rochdale	Blackpool	Loan
22 November 2014	(Ivory Coast) François Zoko	Blackpool	Bradford City	Loan
24 November 2014	(United States) Will Packwood	Birmingham City	Colchester United	Loan
25 November 2014	Richard Brindley	Rotherham United	Scunthorpe United	Loan
26 November 2014	Nicky Ajose	Leeds United	Crewe Alexandra	Loan
26 November 2014	Darren Bent	Aston Villa	Brighton & Hove Albion	Loan
26 November 2014	(Poland) Tomasz Cywka	Blackpool	Rochdale	Loan
26 November 2014	(Germany) Max Ehmer	Queens Park Rangers	Gillingham	Loan
26 November 2014	(Algeria) Adlène Guedioura	Crystal Palace	Watford	Loan
26 November 2014	Uche Ikpeazu	Watford	Crewe Alexandra	Loan
26 November 2014	Reece James	Manchester United	Rotherham United	Loan
26 November 2014	Robert Milsom	Rotherham United	Bury	Loan
27 November 2014	Wes Atkinson	West Bromwich Albion	Cambridge United	Loan
27 November 2014	(Scotland) Alex Davey	Chelsea	Scunthorpe United	Loan
27 November 2014	Tom Eaves	Bolton Wanderers	Yeovil Town	Loan
27 November 2014	(Philippines) Neil Etheridge	Oldham Athletic	Charlton Athletic	Loan
27 November 2014	Bradley Fewster	Middlesbrough	Preston North End	Loan
27 November 2014	(France) Seko Fofana	Manchester City	Fulham	Loan
27 November 2014	(Republic of Ireland) Kevin Foley	Wolverhampton Wanderers	Blackpool	Loan
27 November 2014	Jake Goodman	Millwall	AFC Wimbledon	Loan
27 November 2014	Jordan Graham	Aston Villa	Wolverhampton Wanderers	Loan
27 November 2014	Ryan Hall	Rotherham United	Notts County	Loan
27 November 2014	(Republic of Ireland) Noel Hunt	Leeds United	Ipswich Town	Loan
27 November 2014	(Scotland) Alex Jakubiak	Watford	Dagenham & Redbridge	Loan
27 November 2014	Sullay Kaikai	Crystal Palace	Cambridge United	Loan
27 November 2014	(Republic of Ireland) Paddy Kenny	Bolton Wanderers	Oldham Athletic	Loan
27 November 2014	(Wales) Tom Lawrence	Leicester City	Rotherham United	Loan
27 November 2014	Harry Lennon	Charlton Athletic	Gillingham	Loan
27 November 2014	(Scotland) Craig Mackail-Smith	Brighton & Hove Albion	Peterborough United	Loan
27 November 2014	Remi Matthews	Norwich City	Burton Albion	Loan
27 November 2014	Carlton Morris	Norwich City	York City	Loan
27 November 2014	Chris O'Grady	Brighton & Hove Albion	Sheffield United	Loan
27 November 2014	Stuart O'Keefe	Crystal Palace	Blackpool	Loan
27 November 2014	(Nigeria) Fred Onyedinma	Millwall	Wycombe Wanderers	Loan
27 November 2014	Josh Passley	Fulham	Shrewsbury Town	Loan
27 November 2014	Matthew Pennington	Everton	Coventry City	Loan
27 November 2014	(Republic of Ireland) Sean St Ledger	Unattached	Ipswich Town	Free
27 November 2014	Matt Smith	Fulham	Bristol City	Loan
27 November 2014	Donovan Wilson	Bristol Rovers	Wolverhampton Wanderers	Loan
27 November 2014	Scott Wootton	Leeds United	Rotherham United	Loan
27 November 2014	Tom Youngs	Bolton Wanderers	Oldham Athletic	Loan
4 December 2014	(Republic of Ireland) Darren O'Dea	Unattached	Blackpool	Free
4 December 2014	(Serbia) Nikola Žigić	Unattached	Birmingham City	Free
5 December 2014	(Iceland) Eiður Guðjohnsen	Unattached	Bolton Wanderers	Free
24 December 2014	Emile Heskey	Unattached	Bolton Wanderers	Free
3 January 2015	Darren Bent	Aston Villa	Derby County	Loan
3 January 2015	Paris Cowan-Hall	Wycombe Wanderers	Millwall	Undisclosed
3 January 2015	Emmanuel Dieseruvwe	Sheffield Wednesday	Chesterfield	Loan
3 January 2015	Jack Dunn	Liverpool	Cheltenham Town	Loan
3 January 2015	(Netherlands) Eljero Elia	(Germany) Werder Bremen	Southampton	Loan
3 January 2015	Matt Grimes	Exeter City	(Wales) Swansea City	£1.75m
3 January 2015	Greg Halford	Nottingham Forest	Brighton & Hove Albion	Loan
3 January 2015	Scott Harrison	Sunderland	Hartlepool United	Loan
3 January 2015	(Canada) Doneil Henry	(Cyprus) Apollon Limassol	West Ham United	Undisclosed
3 January 2015	Hallam Hope	Everton	Bury	Undisclosed
3 January 2015	Lloyd Jones	Liverpool	Cheltenham Town	Loan
3 January 2015	Alex Kiwomya	Chelsea	Barnsley	Loan
3 January 2015	Greg Luer	Burgess Hill Town	Hull City	Undisclosed
3 January 2015	(Scotland) Lewis Macleod	(Scotland) Rangers	Brentford	£1m
3 January 2015	Michael Morrison	Charlton Athletic	Birmingham City	Undisclosed
3 January 2015	(Portugal) Nélson Oliveira	(Portugal) Benfica	(Wales) Swansea City	Loan
3 January 2015	Ryan Shotton	Stoke City	Derby County	Undisclosed
3 January 2015	Kevin Stewart	Liverpool	Cheltenham Town	Loan
3 January 2015	John Swift	Chelsea	Swindon Town	Loan
3 January 2015	Aaron Tshibola	Reading	Hartlepool United	Loan
5 January 2015	(Philippines) Neil Etheridge	Oldham Athletic	Charlton Athletic	Free
5 January 2015	Jordan Graham	Aston Villa	Wolverhampton Wanderers	Undisclosed
5 January 2015	Dan Harding	Nottingham Forest	Millwall	Loan
5 January 2015	(Germany) Lukas Podolski	Arsenal	(Italy) Internazionale	Loan
5 January 2015	(Spain) Fernando Torres	Chelsea	(Italy) Milan	Undisclosed
6 January 2015	(Serbia) Marko Dmitrović	(Hungary) Újpest	Charlton Athletic	Undisclosed
6 January 2015	Nick Pope	Charlton Athletic	Bury	Loan
6 January 2015	(Australia) Mark Schwarzer	Chelsea	Leicester City	Free
6 January 2015	(Scotland) Tony Watt	(Belgium) Standard Liège	Charlton Athletic	Undisclosed
6 January 2015	(Argentina) Mauro Zárate	West Ham United	Queens Park Rangers	Loan
7 January 2015	Scott Malone	Millwall	(Wales) Cardiff City	Undisclosed
7 January 2015	(Spain) Oriol Riera	Wigan Athletic	(Spain) Deportivo	Loan
7 January 2015	Jayden Stockley	Bournemouth	Luton Town	Loan
7 January 2015	(Spain) Víctor Valdés	Unattached	Manchester United	Free
7 January 2015	(Germany) Philipp Wollscheid	(Germany) Bayer Leverkusen	Stoke City	Loan
8 January 2015	Lewis Baker	Chelsea	Sheffield Wednesday	Loan
8 January 2015	Jack Barmby	Leicester City	Rotherham United	Loan
8 January 2015	(Northern Ireland) Rory Donnelly	(Wales) Swansea City	Tranmere Rovers	Loan
8 January 2015	(Australia) Callum Elder	Leicester City	Mansfield Town	Loan
8 January 2015	Grant Hall	Tottenham Hotspur	Blackpool	Loan
8 January 2015	Tom Hopper	Leicester City	Scunthorpe United	Loan
8 January 2015	(Republic of Ireland) Noel Hunt	Unattached	Ipswich Town	Free
8 January 2015	Todd Kane	Chelsea	Nottingham Forest	Loan
8 January 2015	Michael Keane	Manchester United	Burnley	Undisclosed
8 January 2015	Matt Macey	Arsenal	Accrington Stanley	Loan
8 January 2015	John Marquis	Millwall	Gillingham	Loan
8 January 2015	Josh Morris	Blackburn Rovers	Fleetwood Town	Loan
8 January 2015	Jacob Murphy	Norwich City	Scunthorpe United	Loan
8 January 2015	Adedeji Oshilaja	(Wales) Cardiff City	AFC Wimbledon	Loan
8 January 2015	Ben Pearson	Manchester United	Barnsley	Loan
8 January 2015	Liam Ridgewell	(United States) Portland Timbers	Wigan Athletic	Loan
8 January 2015	Jon Stead	Huddersfield Town	Bradford City	Loan
8 January 2015	(Slovenia) Etien Velikonja	(Wales) Cardiff City	(Belgium) Lierse	Loan
8 January 2015	George Waring	Stoke City	Barnsley	Loan
9 January 2015	David Ferguson	Sunderland	Blackpool	Undisclosed
9 January 2015	Adam Hammill	Huddersfield Town	Rotherham United	Loan
9 January 2015	Alex Henshall	Ipswich Town	Blackpool	Loan
9 January 2015	(Czech Republic) Tomáš Kalas	Chelsea	Middlesbrough	Loan
9 January 2015	(Mexico) Miguel Layún	(Spain) Granada	Watford	Undisclosed
9 January 2015	John Lundstram	Everton	Leyton Orient	Loan
9 January 2015	(Austria) Stefan Maierhofer	Unattached	Millwall	Free
9 January 2015	Connor Oliver	Sunderland	Blackpool	Undisclosed
9 January 2015	Alex Revell	Rotherham United	(Wales) Cardiff City	Undisclosed
9 January 2015	(Brazil) Alefe Santos	Derby County	Notts County	Loan
9 January 2015	(France) Saër Sène	Unattached	Blackpool	Free
9 January 2015	Adam Smith	Leicester City	Mansfield Town	Loan
9 January 2015	(Italy) Marcello Trotta	Fulham	(Italy) Avellino	Undisclosed
9 January 2015	Danny Ward	Huddersfield Town	Rotherham United	Loan
10 January 2015	Gary Gardner	Aston Villa	Nottingham Forest	Loan
10 January 2015	Joe Pigott	Charlton Athletic	Southend United	Loan
10 January 2015	Courtney Senior	Brentford	Wycombe Wanderers	Loan
10 January 2015	Alex Wynter	Crystal Palace	Colchester United	Undisclosed
10 January 2015	Matt Young	Sheffield Wednesday	Carlisle United	Loan
12 January 2015	(Jamaica) Shaun Cummings	Reading	Millwall	Undisclosed
12 January 2015	Sam Johnstone	Manchester United	Preston North End	Loan
12 January 2015	(Serbia) Matija Nastasić	Manchester City	(Germany) Schalke 04	Loan
12 January 2015	(Sweden) Isak Ssewankambo	Unattached	Derby County	Free
12 January 2015	Kwame Thomas	Derby County	Notts County	Loan
12 January 2015	Danny Ward	Huddersfield Town	Rotherham United	Undisclosed
13 January 2015	(Morocco) Oussama Assaidi	Liverpool	(United Arab Emirates) Al Ahli Club	Undisclosed
13 January 2015	(Spain) Carles Gil	(Spain) Valencia	Aston Villa	£3.2m
13 January 2015	(Northern Ireland) Cameron McGeehan	Norwich City	Cambridge United	Loan
13 January 2015	(France) Yaya Sanogo	Arsenal	Crystal Palace	Loan
13 January 2015	(Iceland) Björn Sigurðarson	Wolverhampton Wanderers	(Denmark) Copenhagen	Loan
14 January 2015	Benik Afobe	Arsenal	Wolverhampton Wanderers	Undisclosed
14 January 2015	(Ivory Coast) Wilfried Bony	(Wales) Swansea City	Manchester City	£28m
14 January 2015	(Jamaica) Jamar Loza	Norwich City	Yeovil Town	Loan
14 January 2015	Joe Riley	Bolton Wanderers	Bury	Free
15 January 2015	(Australia) Cameron Burgess	Fulham	(Scotland) Ross County	Loan
15 January 2015	(Wales) Jake Cassidy	Wolverhampton Wanderers	Southend United	Loan
15 January 2015	(Spain) Javi Guerra	(Wales) Cardiff City	(Spain) Málaga	Loan
15 January 2015	Scott Loach	Rotherham United	Peterborough United	Loan
15 January 2015	(Republic of Ireland) Liam McAlinden	Wolverhampton Wanderers	Fleetwood Town	Loan
15 January 2015	Paul McCallum	West Ham United	Portsmouth	Loan
15 January 2015	(Republic of Ireland) Conor Sammon	Derby County	Rotherham United	Loan
15 January 2015	George Saville	Wolverhampton Wanderers	Bristol City	Loan
15 January 2015	James Tavernier	Wigan Athletic	Bristol City	Loan
15 January 2015	Stephen Warnock	Leeds United	Derby County	Undisclosed
15 January 2015	Anthony Wordsworth	Ipswich Town	Crawley Town	Loan
16 January 2015	(Spain) Raúl Albentosa	(Spain) Eibar	Derby County	Undisclosed
16 January 2015	(United States) Jozy Altidore	Sunderland	(Canada) Toronto FC	Undisclosed
16 January 2015	Jonson Clarke-Harris	Rotherham United	Milton Keynes Dons	Loan
16 January 2015	Jermain Defoe	(Canada) Toronto FC	Sunderland	Undisclosed
16 January 2015	(Italy) Diego Fabbrini	Watford	Millwall	Loan
16 January 2015	Zeki Fryers	Crystal Palace	Rotherham United	Loan
16 January 2015	(Republic of Ireland) Bradley Garmston	West Bromwich Albion	Gillingham	Loan
16 January 2015	Jake Gray	Crystal Palace	Cheltenham Town	Loan
16 January 2015	(Wales) Ryan Hedges	(Wales) Swansea City	Leyton Orient	Loan
16 January 2015	(Croatia) Andrej Kramarić	(Croatia) Rijeka	Leicester City	£9m
16 January 2015	Olly Lee	Birmingham City	Plymouth Argyle	Loan
16 January 2015	(Wales) Lewis Price	Crystal Palace	Crawley Town	Loan
16 January 2015	Freddie Sears	Colchester United	Ipswich Town	Undisclosed
17 January 2015	Connor Randall	Liverpool	Shrewsbury Town	Loan
17 January 2015	(Wales) Liam Shephard	(Wales) Swansea City	Yeovil Town	Loan
17 January 2015	(Spain) Suso	Liverpool	(Italy) Milan	Undisclosed
19 January 2015	Lloyd Dyer	Watford	Birmingham City	Loan
19 January 2015	(Sierra Leone) Medo	Bolton Wanderers	(Israel) Maccabi Haifa	Loan
19 January 2015	Montell Moore	Brentford	(Denmark) Midtjylland	Loan
19 January 2015	Hayden White	Bolton Wanderers	Notts County	Loan
20 January 2015	(Republic of Ireland) Leon Best	Blackburn Rovers	Brighton & Hove Albion	Loan
20 January 2015	(Republic of Ireland) Paddy Kenny	Unattached	Ipswich Town	Free
20 January 2015	Chris Long	Everton	Brentford	Loan
20 January 2015	Jack Marriott	Ipswich Town	Colchester United	Loan
20 January 2015	(Serbia) Miloš Veljković	Tottenham Hotspur	Charlton Athleltic	Loan
21 January 2015	(Poland) Krystian Bielik	(Poland) Legia Warsaw	Arsenal	£2.4m
21 January 2015	(Canada) David Edgar	Birmingham City	Huddersfield Town	Loan
22 January 2015	Dominic Ball	Tottenham Hotspur	Cambridge United	Loan
22 January 2015	Matthew Briggs	Millwall	Colchester United	Loan
22 January 2015	Nathaniel Chalobah	Chelsea	Reading	Loan
22 January 2015	Devante Cole	Manchester City	Milton Keynes Dons	Loan
22 January 2015	Luke Daniels	West Bromwich Albion	Scunthorpe United	Undisclosed
22 January 2015	(Wales) Neal Eardley	Birmingham City	Leyton Orient	Loan
22 January 2015	(Scotland) Andy Halliday	Middlesbrough	Bradford City	Free
22 January 2015	Will Keane	Manchester United	Sheffield Wednesday	Loan
22 January 2015	Niall Maher	Bolton Wanderers	Blackpool	Loan
22 January 2015	Jacob Mellis	Blackpool	Oldham Athletic	Loan
22 January 2015	Kyle Naughton	Tottenham Hotspur	(Wales) Swansea City	£5m
22 January 2015	Craig Tanner	Reading	AFC Wimbledon	Loan
22 January 2015	(Slovenia) Jure Travner	(Azerbaijan) Baku	Reading	Free
23 January 2015	(Ivory Coast) Sol Bamba	(Italy) Palermo	Leeds United	Loan
23 January 2015	(Scotland) Paul Coutts	Derby County	Sheffield United	Undisclosed
23 January 2015	Scott Dutton	Wolverhampton Wanderers	Crawley Town	Loan
23 January 2015	(Netherlands) Royston Drenthe	Reading	(Turkey) Erciyesspor	Undisclosed
23 January 2015	(Jamaica) Daniel Johnson	Aston Villa	Preston North End	Undisclosed
23 January 2015	(Israel) Beram Kayal	(Scotland) Celtic	Brighton & Hove Albion	Undisclosed
23 January 2015	(Serbia) Vujadin Savić	Unattached	Watford	Free
23 January 2015	Ben Watson	Wigan Athletic	Watford	Undisclosed
23 January 2015	Charlie Wyke	Middlesbrough	Carlisle United	Undisclosed
24 January 2015	John Brayford	(Wales) Cardiff City	Sheffield United	Undisclosed
24 January 2015	(Republic of Ireland) Sean Maguire	West Ham United	Accrington Stanley	Loan
24 January 2015	Lee Peltier	Huddersfield Town	(Wales) Cardiff City	Undisclosed
24 January 2015	(Wales) Jazz Richards	(Wales) Swansea City	Fulham	Loan
25 January 2015	(Scotland) Shaun Maloney	Wigan Athletic	(United States) Chicago Fire	Undisclosed
26 January 2015	(Australia) Chris Herd	Aston Villa	Wigan Athletic	Loan
26 January 2015	(Netherlands) Jos Hooiveld	Southampton	Millwall	Loan
26 January 2015	Adam Le Fondre	(Wales) Cardiff City	Bolton Wanderers	Loan
26 January 2015	(Northern Ireland) Martin Paterson	Huddersfield Town	(United States) Orlando City	Loan
26 January 2015	(France) Granddi Ngoyi	(Italy) Palermo	Leeds United	Loan
27 January 2015	(Costa Rica) Joel Campbell	Arsenal	(Spain) Villarreal	Loan
27 January 2015	(Cameroon) Samuel Eto'o	Everton	(Italy) Sampdoria	Undisclosed
27 January 2015	(Portugal) Rochinha	(Portugal) Benfica	Bolton Wanderers	Loan
27 January 2015	Joe Rothwell	Manchester United	Blackpool	Loan
27 January 2015	(France) Mapou Yanga-Mbiwa	Newcastle United	(Italy) Roma	£5.5m
28 January 2015	Adam Forshaw	Wigan Athletic	Middlesbrough	Undisclosed
28 January 2015	(Northern Ireland) Jamie Harney	West Ham United	Colchester United	Free
28 January 2015	Uche Ikpeazu	Watford	Doncaster Rovers	Loan
28 January 2015	(France) Mikael Mandron	Sunderland	Shrewsbury Town	Loan
28 January 2015	Callum McManaman	Wigan Athletic	West Bromwich Albion	£4.75m
28 January 2015	Stuart O'Keefe	Crystal Palace	(Wales) Cardiff City	Undisclosed
28 January 2015	(Brazil) Gabriel Paulista	(Spain) Villarreal	Arsenal	£11.2m
29 January 2015	(Nigeria) Shola Ameobi	Unattached	Crystal Palace	Free
29 January 2015	Richard Brindley	Rotherham United	Oxford United	Loan
29 January 2015	(Belgium) Christophe Lepoint	(Belgium) Gent	Charlton Athletic	Undisclosed
29 January 2015	Jordon Mutch	Queens Park Rangers	Crystal Palace	Undisclosed
29 January 2015	Josh Passley	Fulham	Portsmouth	Loan
29 January 2015	Dominic Samuel	Reading	Coventry City	Loan
29 January 2015	Kaiyne Woolery	Bolton Wanderers	Notts County	Loan
30 January 2015	Ben Amos	Manchester United	Bolton Wanderers	Loan
30 January 2015	(Spain) Adrián Colunga	Brighton & Hove Albion	(Spain) Granada	Loan
30 January 2015	Jack Cork	Southampton	(Wales) Swansea City	Undisclosed
30 January 2015	(Libya) Sadiq El Fitouri	Salford City	Manchester United	Undisclosed
30 January 2015	George Evans	Manchester City	Scunthorpe United	Loan
30 January 2015	Jack Hunt	Crystal Palace	Rotherham United	Loan
30 January 2015	Jake Kean	Blackburn Rovers	Oldham Athletic	Loan
30 January 2015	Louis Laing	Nottingham Forest	(Scotland) Motherwell	Loan
30 January 2015	(Republic of Ireland) Kenny McEvoy	Tottenham Hotspur	Colchester United	Loan
30 January 2015	(Northern Ireland) Billy Mckay	(Scotland) Inverness Caledonian Thistle	Wigan Athletic	Undisclosed
30 January 2015	Tom Naylor	Derby County	Burton Albion	Loan
30 January 2015	Jason Pearce	Leeds United	Wigan Athletic	Undisclosed
30 January 2015	Scott Sinclair	Manchester City	Aston Villa	Loan
30 January 2015	(Senegal) Pape Souaré	(France) Lille	Crystal Palace	Undisclosed
30 January 2015	Jay Spearing	Bolton Wanderers	Blackburn Rovers	Loan
30 January 2015	(Romania) George Țucudean	Charlton Athletic	(Romania) Steaua București	Loan
31 January 2015	(Scotland) Tom Aldred	Accrington Stanley	Blackpool	Loan
31 January 2015	Ryan Hall	Rotherham United	Luton Town	Free
2 February 2015	(Scotland) Tom Aldred	Accrington Stanley	Blackpool	Undisclosed
2 February 2015	Dele Alli	Milton Keynes Dons	Tottenham Hotspur	£5m
2 February 2015	Dele Alli	Tottenham Hotspur	Milton Keynes Dons	Loan
2 February 2015	Keshi Anderson	Barton Rovers	Crystal Palace	Undisclosed
2 February 2015	(Portugal) Bruno Andrade	Queens Park Rangers	Stevenage	Loan
2 February 2015	(France) Tony Andreu	(Scotland) Hamilton Academical	Norwich City	Undisclosed
2 February 2015	(Republic of Ireland) Keith Andrews	Bolton Wanderers	Milton Keynes Dons	Loan
2 February 2015	(Scotland) Jordan Archer	Tottenham Hotspur	Millwall	Loan
2 February 2015	(Scotland) Barry Bannan	Crystal Palace	Bolton Wanderers	Loan
2 February 2015	Ryan Bertrand	Chelsea	Southampton	Undisclosed
2 February 2015	Gaël Bigirimana	Newcastle United	(Scotland) Rangers	Loan
2 February 2015	(Cameroon) Gaëtan Bong	Unattached	Wigan Athletic	Free
2 February 2015	(Norway) Andreas Breimyr	(Norway) Bryne	Crystal Palace	Undisclosed
2 February 2015	(Norway) Andreas Breimyr	Crystal Palace	(Norway) Bryne	Loan
2 February 2015	(Romania) Sergiu Buș	(Bulgaria) CSKA Sofia	Sheffield Wednesday	Undisclosed
2 February 2015	(Spain) Iván Calero	Derby County	Burton Albion	Loan
2 February 2015	(Albania) Edgar Çani	(Italy) Catania	Leeds United	Loan
2 February 2015	Daniel Carr	Huddersfield Town	Dagenham & Redbridge	Loan
2 February 2015	Ashley Carter	Wolverhampton Wanderers	Chesterfield	Loan
2 February 2015	Leon Clarke	Wolverhampton Wanderers	Wigan Athletic	Loan
2 February 2015	(Australia) Alex Cisak	Burnley	Leyton Orient	Loan
2 February 2015	(Colombia) Juan Cuadrado	(Italy) Fiorentina	Chelsea	£23.3m
2 February 2015	(Netherlands) Chris David	Fulham	(Netherlands) Twente	Loan
2 February 2015	(France) Andy Delort	Wigan Athletic	(France) Tours	Loan
2 February 2015	Emmanuel Dieseruvwe	Sheffield Wednesday	Chesterfield	Undisclosed
2 February 2015	(Republic of Ireland) Eoin Doyle	Chesterfield	(Wales) Cardiff City	Undisclosed
2 February 2015	Mark Duffy	Birmingham City	Chesterfield	Loan
2 February 2015	(Serbia) Filip Đuričić	(Portugal) Benfica	Southampton	Loan
2 February 2015	(Germany) Thomas Eisfeld	Fulham	(Germany) VfL Bochum	Loan
2 February 2015	(Northern Ireland) Shane Ferguson	Newcastle United	(Scotland) Rangers	Loan
2 February 2015	Darren Fletcher	Manchester United	West Bromwich Albion	Free
2 February 2015	Scott Harrison	Sunderland	Hartlepool United	Undisclosed
2 February 2015	Jordi Hiwula	Manchester City	Walsall	Loan
2 February 2015	(Germany) Robert Huth	Stoke City	Leicester City	Loan
2 February 2015	Tom Ince	Hull City	Derby County	Loan
2 February 2015	(Switzerland) Saidy Janko	Manchester United	Bolton Wanderers	Loan
2 February 2015	Danny Johnson	(Wales) Cardiff City	Stevenage	Loan
2 February 2015	(Scotland) Denny Johnstone	Birmingham City	Cheltenham Town	Loan
2 February 2015	Andy Kellett	Bolton Wanderers	Manchester United	Loan
2 February 2015	(Scotland) Matty Kennedy	Everton	(Wales) Cardiff City	Undisclosed
2 February 2015	(Northern Ireland) Kyle Lafferty	Norwich City	(Turkey) Çaykur Rizespor	Loan
2 February 2015	(Northern Ireland) Caolan Lavery	Sheffield Wednesday	Chesterfield	Loan
2 February 2015	(South Korea) Lee Chung-yong	Bolton Wanderers	Crystal Palace	Undisclosed
2 February 2015	Aaron Lennon	Tottenham Hotspur	Everton	Loan
2 February 2015	Jesse Lingard	Manchester United	Derby County	Loan
2 February 2015	Greg Luer	Hull City	Port Vale	Loan
2 February 2015	(Scotland) Gary MacKenzie	Blackpool	Bradford City	Loan
2 February 2015	(Greece) Charis Mavrias	Sunderland	(Greece) Panathinaikos	Loan
2 February 2015	(Switzerland) Kevin Mbabu	Newcastle United	(Scotland) Rangers	Loan
2 February 2015	Ishmael Miller	Blackpool	Huddersfield Town	Undisclosed
2 February 2015	Conor McAleny	Everton	(Wales) Cardiff City	Loan
2 February 2015	Lewis McGugan	Watford	Sheffield Wednesday	Loan
2 February 2015	(Portugal) Filipe Melo	(Portugal) Moreirense	Sheffield Wednesday	Undisclosed
2 February 2015	(Senegal) Dame N'Doye	(Russia) Lokomotiv Moscow	Hull City	Undisclosed
2 February 2015	Jack O'Connell	Blackburn Rovers	Brentford	Undisclosed
2 February 2015	(Republic of Ireland) Anthony O'Connor	Blackburn Rovers	Plymouth Argyle	Undisclosed
2 February 2015	Nathan Oduwa	Tottenham Hotspur	Luton Town	Loan
2 February 2015	Sheyi Ojo	Liverpool	Wigan Athletic	Loan
2 February 2015	(Wales) Tommy O'Sullivan	(Wales) Cardiff City	Port Vale	Loan
2 February 2015	(Republic of Ireland) Ben Priest	Wolverhampton Wanderers	(Scotland) Dundee	Free
2 February 2015	Callum Robinson	Aston Villa	Preston North End	Loan
2 February 2015	(Egypt) Mohamed Salah	Chelsea	(Italy) Fiorentina	Loan
2 February 2015	(Italy) Davide Santon	Newcastle United	(Italy) Internazionale	Loan
2 February 2015	(Germany) André Schürrle	Chelsea	(Germany) VfL Wolfsburg	£22m
2 February 2015	(Bulgaria) Simeon Slavchev	(Portugal) Sporting CP	Bolton Wanderers	Loan
2 February 2015	Emmanuel Sonupe	Tottenham Hotspur	(Scotland) St Mirren	Loan
2 February 2015	Remie Streete	Newcastle United	(Scotland) Rangers	Loan
2 February 2015	Michael Tonge	Leeds United	Millwall	Loan
2 February 2015	(Czech Republic) Filip Twardzik	(Scotland) Celtic	Bolton Wanderers	Undisclosed
2 February 2015	(Belgium) Marnick Vermijl	Manchester United	Sheffield Wednesday	Undisclosed
2 February 2015	(Slovenia) Haris Vučkić	Newcastle United	(Scotland) Rangers	Loan
2 February 2015	Conor Wilkinson	Bolton Wanderers	Oldham Athletic	Loan
2 February 2015	Luke Williams	Middlesbrough	Coventry City	Loan
2 February 2015	(Nigeria) Yakubu	Unattached	Reading	Free
2 February 2015	Wilfried Zaha	Manchester United	Crystal Palace	Undisclosed
