= 2014–15 Bolton Wanderers F.C. season =

Bolton Wanderers
2014–15 season
- Chairman: Phil Gartside
- Manager: Dougie Freedman (until 3 October); Andy Hughes & Lee Turner (caretakers between 4–12 October); Neil Lennon (from 12 October)
- Stadium: Macron Stadium
- Championship: 18th
- FA Cup: Fourth round
- League Cup: Third round
- Top goalscorer: League: Adam Le Fondre (8); All: Adam Le Fondre (8)
- Highest home attendance: 23,203 (v Blackburn Rovers, 26 December 2014)
- Lowest home attendance: 9,249 (v Bury, 12 August 2014)
- Average home league attendance: 15,413
| Home colours | Away colours |

The 2014–15 season was Bolton Wanderers's third consecutive season in the Football League Championship following their relegation from the Premier League in 2012.

It covers the period from 1 July 2014 to 30 June 2015.

== Pre-season ==
On 19 May, four pre-season friendly games were announced, beginning against Macclesfield Town on 18 July and finishing against Port Vale on 30 July, with games against Rochdale and Tranmere Rovers also being played, all away from home. A pre-season tour of Denmark and Sweden was announced on 22 May, which would take in games against Brøndby, Vestsjælland and Mjällby. A final game against Vitesse Arnhem, the first at the renamed Macron Stadium, was added, which would take place on 3 August.

On 30 June, the Reebok Stadium officially changed its name to the Macron Stadium. Later that week, the club confirmed that Stuart Holden would remain with the club for the forthcoming season on a non-contract basis as he continued to regain his fitness.

Bolton's opening game of pre-season ended in a draw, with former Bolton striker Johan Elmander giving Brøndby the lead. Jermaine Beckford missed a penalty for Bolton, before Craig Davies levelled, also from the spot. Robert Hall was sent off late in the game for a rash challenge. In a game where manager Dougie Freedman fielded two different outfield teams either side of half-time, Gambian trialist Modou Barrow made an appearance from the bench, being brought on for academy player Georg Iliev. Wanderers then travelled to Vestsjælland where they picked up their first win of the pre-season, winning 1–0 courtesy of a first half goal from Liam Feeney. Wanderers' final game on their tour came at Mjällby. Bolton raced into the lead, with Jermaine Beckford and Robert Hall both scoring to make it 2–0 after seven minutes. Mjällby responded well, however, with first half goals from Mattias Håkansson, Kristian Haynes and Kwame Bonsu, handing Bolton their first loss of pre-season.

Bolton's first game after coming home from the tour of Denmark and Sweden was away to non-league outfit Macclesfield Town. The home side opened the scoring in the first half through Chris Holroyd but Bolton equalised through young substitute Zach Clough nine minutes from time. They followed this up with a comfortable win against Rochdale, with Neil Danns and young substitute Conor Wilkinson getting the goals. The following game was away to Tranmere Rovers, which finished in a 1–1 draw. Jay Spearing scored his first goal of pre-season to put Wanderers ahead, but Eliot Richards equalised for the home side. Wanderers penultimate game of pre-season came away to Port Vale, where they got off to a good start, with Matt Mills heading home his first goal of pre-season. Jermaine Beckford doubled Bolton's tally from over 30 yards. Tom Pope pulled a goal back for the home side late on, but Bolton held on for the win.

On 26 July, the club confirmed that Jay Spearing would be the club captain for the forthcoming season, following the departure of Zat Knight. Matt Mills, meanwhile, was appointed as the club's vice-captain.

In their final game of pre-season, the home friendly against Vitesse Arnhem, Bolton fell behind to a Marko Vejinović free-kick and could not muster a response, losing the first fixture at their renamed stadium.

| 10 July 2014 | Brøndby | 1–1 | Bolton Wanderers | Brøndby Stadium |
| 19:00 CEST | Elmander 31' | Report | C. Davies 48' (pen.) |

| 13 July 2014 | Vestsjælland | 0–1 | Bolton Wanderers | Harboe Arena Slagelse |
| 16:00 CEST | | Report | Feeney 33' |

| 16 July 2014 | Mjällby | 3–2 | Bolton Wanderers | Strandvallen |
| 19:00 CEST | Håkansson 12'; Haynes 16'; Bonsu 38' | Report | Beckford 4'; Hall 7' |

| 18 July 2014 | Macclesfield Town | 1–1 | Bolton Wanderers | Moss Rose |
| 19:45 BST | Holroyd 22' | Report | Clough 81' | Attendance: 650 |

| 22 July 2014 | Rochdale | 0–2 | Bolton Wanderers | Spotland |
| 19:45 BST | | Report | Danns 23'; Wilkinson 77' | Attendance: 1,707 |

| 25 July 2014 | Tranmere Rovers | 1–1 | Bolton Wanderers | Prenton Park |
| 19:30 BST | Richards 75' | Report | Spearing 36' |

| 30 July 2014 | Port Vale | 1–2 | Bolton Wanderers | Vale Park |
| 19:45 BST | Pope 84' | Report | Mills 7'; Beckford 77' | Attendance: 1,780 |

| 3 August 2014 | Bolton Wanderers | 0–1 | Vitesse Arnhem | Macron Stadium |
| 14:00 BST | | Report | Vejinović 16' | Attendance: 5,399 |

=== Bolton XI ===
On 20 May, Bolton announced their annual pre-season fixture against Chorley in the Harold Taylor Memorial Trophy would take place on 26 July. This announcement was followed by a Bolton XI's finalised pre-season schedule with games against Bamber Bridge, Hyde, Melbourne Heart, AFC Fylde and Wrexham also taking place. After the announcement of the fixtures, Melbourne Heart were purchased by Manchester City and were rebranded as Melbourne City, while also signing Damien Duff and David Villa.

Conor Wilkinson opened the scoring in the Bolton XI's first game against Bamber Bridge, with Stuart Vasey equalising for the hosts. The following game against Hyde F.C. was postponed due to bad weather. They then hosted Melbourne City, where, despite scoring an early goal through Conor Wilkinson, they lost 5–1, with Kisnorbo, Williams, Brown, Dugandzic and Aaron Mooy, formerly of Wanderers, all scoring for the visitors. They then went to Chorley where Wilkinson again scored the opening goal, but Chorley won the game with goals from Harry Winter and Tom Smyth. Danny Lloyd scored the only goal of Bolton XI's penultimate game of pre-season, as Bolton lost 1–0 to AFC Fylde, but in their final pre-season game, Bolton XI got their first win of pre-season as they beat Wrexham 1–0 courtesy of Chris Lester's first half goal. During pre-season ex-Bristol City defender Liam Fontaine was on trial for the club, playing in matches against AFC Fylde and Wrexham. On 6 August it was revealed that Fontaine had discontinued training with the club at the start of that week, after plans for a behind-closed-doors friendly against Udinese were shelved.

| 12 July 2014 | Bamber Bridge | 1–1 | Bolton Wanderers XI | Sir Tom Finney Stadium |
| 15:00 BST | Vasey 45' | Report | Wilkinson 42' |

| 19 July 2014 | Hyde | P–P | Bolton Wanderers XI | Ewen Fields |
| 15:00 BST | | Report |

| 23 July 2014 | Bolton Wanderers XI | 1–5 | Melbourne City | County Ground |
| 19:30 BST | Wilkinson 5' | Report | Kisnorbo 20'; Williams 27'; Mooy 35'; Brown 65'; Dugandzic 74' |

| 26 July 2014 Harold Taylor; Memorial Trophy | Chorley | 2–1 | Bolton Wanderers XI | Victory Park |
| 15:00 BST | Winter 52'; Smyth 80' | Report | Wilkinson 20' | Attendance: 700 |

| 29 July 2014 | AFC Fylde | 1–0 | Bolton Wanderers XI | Kellamergh Park |
| 19:30 BST | Lloyd 76' | Report |

| 1 August 2014 | Wrexham | 0–1 | Bolton Wanderers XI | Racecourse Ground |
| 19:45 BST | | Report | Lester 38' |

== Championship ==
The fixtures for the 2014–15 Football League Championship season were released on 18 June 2014.

=== August ===
Bolton began their third consecutive season in the second tier away at Watford on 9 August. Wanderers conceded three goals without reply; Troy Deeney, Matěj Vydra and Fernando Forestieri scoring the goals for the Hornets. Their first league fixture at the newly renamed Macron Stadium was against Nottingham Forest a week later. All four goals of the 2–2 draw came in the first half; Joe Mason first headed in a Jay Spearing free-kick before Britt Assombalonga equalised for Forest. David Wheater put Bolton back in front but captain Jay Spearing brought down Assombalonga in the box, who picked himself up to draw Forest level again. Against Middlesbrough, Craig Davies put Bolton in front with a penalty in the 27th minute after being brought down by Seb Hines. David Wheater was then adjudged to have handled in the box just before half-time – leading to Grant Leadbitter equalising for Boro, again from the spot. Kike scored a late winner to give Middlesbrough their first win away at Bolton since 1987. Away to Brighton and Leeds United, Bolton lost 2–1 and 1–0, respectively, to leave them winless after five games. Bolton took the lead against Brighton, Matt Mills opening the scoring but goals from Craig Mackail-Smith and João Teixeira gave Brighton the points. Former Bolton loanee Stephen Warnock scored the only goal for Leeds, consigning them to defeat once again. Craig Davies was named player of the month for August, scoring two goals from the penalty spot.

=== September ===
Bolton started September against Sheffield Wednesday, the result being a goalless draw. This brought an end to their three match losing streak but meant they still hadn't won a league game this season, extending their winless start to the season to six games. Bolton ended their next game on the right side of a five-goal thriller. Anthony Wordsworth put Rotherham in front in the first half but Joe Mason scored two to bring Bolton ahead with ten minutes remaining on the clock. Two minutes later, Jordan Bowery equalised for the Millers but Mason scored his first career hat-trick and the club's first since Fredi Bobic put in three against Ipswich Town in 2002, to hand Bolton their first win of the new season. They couldn't follow this up with a second, however, and lost by a solitary goal at Molineux against Wolves; Nouha Dicko scoring the goal for the hosts. Against Steve McLaren's Derby County, Bolton conceded a goal either side of half-time to send them back into the relegation zone. The loss sparked mass protests from the crowd during the game, with fans chanting for both manager Dougie Freedman and chairman Phil Gartside to leave their posts.

=== October ===
A few days later, on the first of the month, Bolton conceded four goals without reply as they fell to Fulham at Craven Cottage, one of two teams that were below them in the table.

Following the defeat to Fulham, manager Dougie Freedman was relieved of his duties. Initially, the club indicated that Freedman would remain in his position for the match against Bournemouth at the weekend, as they confirmed he would be taking his weekly press conference on Friday 3 October. However, the following day a statement was released explaining that Freedman had left the club 'by mutual consent'. Player-coach Andy Hughes and goalkeeping coach Lee Turner were confirmed as caretaker managers for the game against the Cherries by the club's website the following day.

Against Bournemouth, Cherries striker Yann Kermorgant was sent off in the 36th minute. Despite this, Bournemouth won 2–1 with Callum Wilson scoring both their goals either side of a Jay Spearing equaliser in the 52nd minute.

Nine days later, during the international break, former Celtic manager Neil Lennon was handed the job of moving Bolton off the bottom of the table. The former Northern Ireland international was confirmed as the Trotters' new manager "following a process of first and second interviews with a shortlist of initial candidates".

Lennon's first game came against Birmingham City at St. Andrew's, against whom he had made his Football League debut as a player for Manchester City. Matt Mills headed in from a corner to give Bolton a lead they managed to hang on to despite Craig Davies missing a penalty while striker Lee Novak was in goal, having replaced the sent off Darren Randolph. Following this, Neil Lennon was sent to the stands as he had left his technical area too many times throughout the match. This was Bolton's second win of the season, and lifted them off the bottom of the table, to be replaced by Blackpool. At The Valley, Charlton scored either side of half-time to go 2–0 up, before Dean Moxey scored his first for the club to make the score 2–1 just a few minutes later, but the team couldn't score an equaliser, giving Lennon his first taste of defeat as Bolton manager. At home for the first time, Neil Danns and Mark Davies scored while Jon Toral did so for Brentford. Ensuring the win, Craig Davies scored with Brentford's 'keeper up the pitch to make it 3–1. With 10% more possession but 10 fewer shots, Bolton fell to Norwich City at Carrow Road in front of the Sky cameras. Cameron Jerome scored a brace while Lee Chung-yong scored his first of the season with just four minutes remaining.

=== November ===
Neil Lennon clinched his second straight home win against Cardiff City, scoring three with no reply against the Bluebirds. Liam Feeney slid to connect with Lee Chung-yong's arrowed cross from the right for his first of the season just nine minutes in before doubling his tally on 36 minutes when Darren Pratley found him with a cross to the back post. Matt Mills sealed the win with 14 minutes remaining to become Bolton's joint-top scorer in all competitions alongside Joe Mason. Against local rivals Wigan Athletic, Bolton scored three goals for the third home game in a row. Max Clayton scored his first for the club after latching on to Lee Chung-yong's through ball before Craig Davies headed in from Liam Feeney's looped cross to make it two. Six minutes later, Chung-yong added to his earlier assist with a goal from the penalty spot; Leon Barnett having been adjudged to have brought down Matt Mills in the box. Callum McManaman volleyed in a consolation but the win brought Bolton out of the relegation zone going into the international break. Their first match following this saw them come up against Blackpool. Blackpool took the lead through Jacob Murphy, before Lee Chung-yong scored for the second consecutive game to get Bolton a point. Bolton finished the month with a 1–0 home win against Huddersfield Town, Craig Davies scoring late into the first half to get Bolton the three points.

=== December ===
Bolton started December with consecutive goalless draws, the first against Reading at the Madejski Stadium, followed by a stalemate against Ipswich Town at the Macron Stadium. Eiður Guðjohnsen made his second début in the match, 14 years after his last appearance against the same opponents, in May 2000. Bolton would make it three clean sheets in a row the following week, defeating Millwall at The Den from a Darren Pratley goal in the second half. On Boxing Day Bolton faced local rivals Blackburn Rovers at the Macron, playing in front of a home crowd of over 20,000 for the first time in nearly three years. Josh King scored for Blackburn, before 37-year-old Emile Heskey scored on his debut after coming off the bench, the assist coming from fellow 37-year-old Eiður Guðjohnsen. Darren Pratley scored his second goal in as many games four minutes later, giving Bolton the bragging rights over their rivals. Two days later they played their last game of 2014, their eight match unbeaten run coming to an end as they lost 2–1 to Huddersfield Town. Bolton took the lead in the 41st minute with Darren Pratley scoring for the third consecutive match followed two minutes later by an equaliser from former Bolton player Jacob Butterfield. Nahki Wells scored with five minutes remaining seeing Bolton lose their last match of 2014.

=== January ===
Following a break for the FA Cup Bolton's first league game of 2015 came at home against Leeds United. Rudolph Austin scored a penalty for Leeds in the third minute but just after half time, Bolton got a penalty of their own. Eiður Guðjohnsen stepped up and scored the equaliser and earning a point for Bolton, it being his first Bolton goal since resigning for the club the previous month, his last goal for Bolton before that coming 15 years earlier May 2000. The week later, Bolton faced Sheffield Wednesday, getting back to winning ways as they won 2–1 at Hillsborough, their third consecutive away win over Wednesday. Liam Feeney opened the scoring in the second minute with Darren Pratley adding a second twenty minutes later. Chris Maguire pulled one back from the penalty spot three minutes later but Bolton held on to claim their first league win of 2015. After the 4th round of the FA Cup, Bolton went to Rotherham United and were 4–0 down after fifty seven minutes, Ben Pringle, Conor Sammon and Paul Green scoring in the first half, before Matt Derbyshire added a fourth. Bolton pulled two back by scoring twice in two minutes through Liam Trotter and Matt Mills but it wasn't enough as Rotherham ran out 4–2 winners. Bolton finished January at home against Wolverhampton Wanderers. Nouha Dicko scored in the third minute to give Wolves the lead but 20 minutes later, Zach Clough, on his league début, scored twice within two minutes – his third goal for the club in only his second appearance – to give Bolton the lead. Deep into injury time though James Henry equalised with a long distance shot, earning his side a share of the spoils.

For the second season in a row, the club's final fixture of the season will be at home to Birmingham City on 2 May 2015.

=== Matches ===
| 9 August 2014 | Watford | 3–0 | Bolton Wanderers | Vicarage Road |
| 15:00 BST | Deeney 17'; Vydra 23'; Forestieri 80' | Report | | Attendance: 15,546; Referee: Carl Boyeson |

| 16 August 2014 | Bolton Wanderers | 2–2 | Nottingham Forest | Macron Stadium |
| 15:00 BST | Mason 4'; Wheater 29' | Report | Assombalonga 27', 35' (pen.) | Attendance: 15,753; Referee: Eddie Ilderton |

| 19 August 2014 | Bolton Wanderers | 1–2 | Middlesbrough | Macron Stadium |
| 20:00 BST | C. Davies 27' (pen.) | Report | Leadbitter 45' (pen.); Kike 78' | Attendance: 13,847; Referee: Steve Martin |

| 23 August 2014 | Brighton | 2–1 | Bolton Wanderers | Amex Stadium |
| 15:00 BST | Mackail-Smith 37'; Teixeira 64' | Report | Mills 25' | Attendance: 24,435; Referee: Graham Scott |

| 30 August 2014 | Leeds United | 1–0 | Bolton Wanderers | Elland Road |
| 15:00 BST | Warnock 17' | Report | | Attendance: 21,901; Referee: Simon Hooper |

| 13 September 2014 | Bolton Wanderers | 0–0 | Sheffield Wednesday | Macron Stadium |
| 15:00 BST | | Report | | Attendance: 15,799; Referee: Andy Haines |

| 16 September 2014 | Bolton Wanderers | 3–2 | Rotherham United | Macron Stadium |
| 20:00 BST | Mason 60', 80', 84' | Report | Wordsworth 33'; Bowery 82' | Attendance: 13,630; Referee: Neil Swarbrick |

| 20 September 2014 | Wolverhampton Wanderers | 1–0 | Bolton Wanderers | Molineux |
| 15:00 BST | Dicko 42' | Report | | Attendance: 22,695; Referee: Andrew Madley |

| 27 September 2014 | Bolton Wanderers | 0–2 | Derby County | Macron Stadium |
| 15:00 BST | | Report | Martin 38', 57' | Attendance: 15,006; Referee: Mark Brown |

| 1 October 2014 | Fulham | 4–0 | Bolton Wanderers | Craven Cottage |
| 20:00 BST | Rodallega 9'; Amorebieta 45'; Christensen 67'; Hoogland 79' | Report | | Attendance: 14,496; Referee: Stuart Attwell |

| 4 October 2014 | Bolton Wanderers | 1–2 | Bournemouth | Macron Stadium |
| 15:00 BST | Spearing 52' | Report | Wilson 46', 68' | Attendance: 13,033; Referee: Andre Marriner |

| 18 October 2014 | Birmingham City | 0–1 | Bolton Wanderers | St. Andrew's |
| 15:00 BST | | Report | Mills 20' | Attendance: 15,149; Referee: Mark Haywood |

| 21 October 2014 | Charlton Athletic | 2–1 | Bolton Wanderers | The Valley |
| 19:45 BST | Țucudean 28'; Jackson 51' | Report | Moxey 54' | Attendance: 13,433; Referee: Simon Hooper |

| 25 October 2014 | Bolton Wanderers | 3–1 | Brentford | Macron Stadium |
| 15:00 BST | Danns 61'; M. Davies 76'; C. Davies 90+6' | Report | Jon Toral 83' | Attendance: 14,811; Referee: Mark Heywood |

| 31 October 2014 | Norwich City | 2–1 | Bolton Wanderers | Carrow Road |
| 19:45 | Jerome 12', 61' | Report | C.Y. Lee 86' | Attendance: 26,070; Referee: Graham Scott |

| 4 November 2014 | Bolton Wanderers | 3–0 | Cardiff City | Macron Stadium |
| 20:00 | Feeney 9', 36'; Mills 76' | Report | | Attendance: 12,961; Referee: Geoff Eltringham |

| 7 November 2014 | Bolton Wanderers | 3–1 | Wigan Athletic | Macron Stadium |
| 20:00 | Clayton 50'; C. Davies 55'; C.Y. Lee 61' (pen.) | Report | McManaman 79' | Attendance: 17,282; Referee: Scott Duncan |

| 22 November 2014 | Blackpool | 1–1 | Bolton Wanderers | Bloomfield Road |
| 15:00 | Murphy 75' | Report | Lee Chung-yong 82' | Attendance: 12,181; Referee: Nigel Miller |

| 29 November 2014 | Bolton Wanderers | 1–0 | Huddersfield Town | Macron Stadium |
| 15:00 | Davies 67' | Report | | Attendance: 15,924; Referee: (England) Carl Berry |

| 6 December 2014 | Reading | 0–0 | Bolton Wanderers | Madejski Stadium |
| 15:00 | | Report | | Attendance: 15,421; Referee: Keith Hill |

| 13 December 2014 | Bolton Wanderers | 0–0 | Ipswich Town | Macron Stadium |
| 15:00 | | Report | | Attendance: 15,186; Referee: Gary Sutton |

| 19 December 2014 | Millwall | 0–1 | Bolton Wanderers | The Den |
| 19:45 | | Report | Pratley 68' | Attendance: 8,635; Referee: Stuart Attwell |

| 26 December 2014 | Bolton Wanderers | 2–1 | Blackburn Rovers | Macron Stadium |
| 15:00 | Heskey 58'; Pratley 62' | Report | King 41' | Attendance: 23,203; Referee: Craig Pawson |

| 28 December 2014 | Huddersfield Town | 2–1 | Bolton Wanderers | John Smith's Stadium |
| 15:00 | Butterfield 43'; Wells 85' | Report | Pratley 41' | Attendance: 15,773; Referee: Trevor Kettle |

| 10 January 2015 | Bolton Wanderers | 1–1 | Leeds United | Macron Stadium |
| 15:00 | Guðjohnsen 48' (pen.) | Report | Austin 3' (pen.) | Attendance: 18,844; Referee: Andy Woolmer |

| 17 January 2015 | Sheffield Wednesday | 1–2 | Bolton Wanderers | Hillsborough Stadium |
| 15:00 | Maguire 28' (pen.) | Report | Feeney 2'; Pratley 25' | Attendance: 22,617; Referee: Graham Scott |

| 27 January 2015 | Rotherham United | 4–2 | Bolton Wanderers | New York Stadium |
| 19:45 | Pringle 2'; Sammon 27'; Green 44'; Derbyshire 57' | Report | Trotter 77'; Mills 79' | Attendance: 8,760; Referee: Darren Drysdale |

| 31 January 2015 | Bolton Wanderers | 2–2 | Wolverhampton Wanderers | Macron Stadium |
| 15:00 | Clough 23', 25' | Report | Dicko 3'; Henry 90+5' | Attendance: 15,869; Referee: Eddie Ilderton |

| 7 February 2015 | Derby County | 4–1 | Bolton Wanderers | Pride Park Stadium |
| 15:00 | Ince 39', 47'; Hendrick 45', 68' | Report | Twardzik 51' | Attendance: 30,310; Referee: Tony Harrington |

| 10 February 2015 | Bolton Wanderers | 3–1 | Fulham | Macron Stadium |
| 19:45 | Guðjohnsen 44'; Janko 80'; Le Fondre 89' | Report | Hutchinson 21' | Attendance: 12,790; Referee: Gary Sutton |

| 14 February 2015 | Bolton Wanderers | 3–4 | Watford | Macron Stadium |
| 15:00 | Clough 37', 85'; Le Fondre 41' | Report | Ighalo 25'; Abdi 69'; Ekstrand 74'; Deeney 90' | Attendance: 14,230; Referee: Geoff Eltringham |

| 21 February 2015 | Nottingham Forest | 4–1 | Bolton Wanderers | Nottingham |
| 15:00 GMT | Burke 8', 68'; Antonio 17'; Lansbury 65' (pen.) | Report | Le Fondre 45+5' (pen.) | Stadium: City Ground; Attendance: 22,441; Referee: Carl Boyeson |

| 24 February 2015 | Middlesbrough | 1–0 | Bolton Wanderers | Middlesbrough |
| 19:45 GMT | Adomah 34' | Report | | Stadium: Riverside Stadium; Attendance: 16,569; Referee: Andy Madley |

| 28 February 2015 | Bolton Wanderers | 1–0 | Brighton & Hove Albion | Macron Stadium |
| 15:00 GMT | Clough 64' | report | | Attendance: 14,115; Referee: Dean Whitestone |

| 3 March 2015 | Bolton Wanderers | 1–1 | Reading | Bolton |
| 19:45 GMT | Guðjohnsen 60' | Report | Mackie 90+3' | Stadium: Macron Stadium; Attendance: 12,795; Referee: Mark Haywood |

| 11 March 2015 | Blackburn Rovers | 1–0 | Bolton Wanderers | Blackburn |
| 19:45 GMT | Rhodes 90+4' | Report | | Stadium: Ewood Park; Attendance: 15,362; Referee: Paul Tierney |

| 14 March 2015 | Bolton Wanderers | 2–0 | Millwall | Bolton |
| 15:00 GMT | Le Fondre 10', 45' | Report | | Stadium: Macron Stadium; Attendance: 14,719; Referee: Andy Haines |

| 17 March 2015 | Ipswich Town | 1–0 | Bolton Wanderers | Ipswich |
| 19:45 GMT | Tabb 79' | report | | Stadium: Portman Road; Attendance: 16,923; Referee: Fred Graham |

| 21 March 2015 | Wigan Athletic | 1–1 | Bolton Wanderers | Wigan |
| 15:00 GMT | Waghorn 90+5' | report | Walker 79' | Stadium: DW Stadium; Attendance: 15,861; Referee: Nigel Miller |

| 4 April 2015 | Bolton Wanderers | 1–1 | Blackpool | Bolton |
| 15:00 BST | Guðjohnsen 90+5' | report | Jacobs 9' | Stadium: Macron Stadium; Attendance: 17,076; Referee: David Coote |

| 6 April 2015 | Cardiff City | 0–3 | Bolton Wanderers | Cardiff |
| 15:00 BST | | report | Guðjohnsen 55'; C.Davies 59', 73' | Stadium: Cardiff City Stadium; Attendance: 20,219; Referee: Keith Stroud |

| 11 April 2015 | Bolton Wanderers | 1–2 | Norwich City | Bolton |
| 15:00 BST | Le Fondre 18' | report | Dorrans 9'; Hooper 90+3' | Stadium: Macron Stadium; Attendance: 16,027; Referee: James Adcock |

| 15 April 2015 | Bolton Wanderers | 1–1 | Charlton Athletic | Bolton |
| 20:00 BST | Le Fondre 79' | report | Bulot 9' | Stadium: Macron Stadium; Attendance: 12,994; Referee: Kevin Wright |

| 18 April 2015 | Brentford | 2–2 | Bolton Wanderers | Brentford |
| 20:00 BST | Pritchard 35'; Douglas 42' | report | Le Fondre 39'; M. Davies 71' | Stadium: Griffin Park; Attendance: 11,874; Referee: Carl Boyeson |

| 27 April 2015 | Bournemouth | 3–0 | Bolton Wanderers | Bournemouth |
| 19:45 BST | Pugh 39'; Ritchie 44'; Wilson 78' | report | | Stadium: Goldsands Stadium; Attendance: 10,070; Referee: Simon Hooper |

| 2 May 2015 | Bolton Wanderers | 0–1 | Birmingham City | Bolton |
| 12:15 BST | | report | Tesche 42' | Stadium: Macron Stadium; Attendance: 18,614; Referee: Mark Brown |

=== League table ===
| Pos | Team | Pld | W | D | L | GF | GA | GD | Pts |
|---|---|---|---|---|---|---|---|---|---|
| 16 | Huddersfield Town | 46 | 13 | 16 | 17 | 58 | 75 | −17 | 55 |
| 17 | Fulham | 46 | 14 | 10 | 22 | 62 | 83 | −21 | 52 |
| 18 | Bolton Wanderers | 46 | 13 | 12 | 21 | 54 | 67 | −13 | 51 |
| 19 | Reading | 46 | 13 | 11 | 22 | 48 | 69 | −21 | 50 |
| 20 | Brighton & Hove Albion | 46 | 10 | 17 | 19 | 44 | 54 | −10 | 47 |

Updated to match(es) played on 2 May 2015. Source: Sky Sports
Rules for classification: 1) Points; 2) Goal difference; 3) Number of goals scored

=== Results summary ===
| Overall | | | | | | | | Home | | | | | | Away | | | | | |
| Pld | W | D | L | GF | GA | GD | Pts | W | D | L | GF | GA | GD | W | D | L | GF | GA | GD |
|---|---|---|---|---|---|---|---|---|---|---|---|---|---|---|---|---|---|---|---|
| 46 | 13 | 12 | 21 | 54 | 67 | −13 | 51 | 9 | 8 | 6 | 35 | 27 | +8 | 4 | 4 | 15 | 19 | 40 | −21 |

Last updated: 14 April 2015.
Source: BBC Sport

== FA Cup ==
Bolton entered the FA Cup at the Third Round stage with the other Championship clubs, as well as those from the Premier League. For the third round Bolton were drawn at home against local rivals Wigan Athletic, who won the competition two years earlier. Debutant Zach Clough scored the only goal of the game, with Bolton being the first team in three years to knock Wigan out in normal time. This earned them an away tie at Anfield Stadium against the previous seasons Premier League runners up, Liverpool. The game ended goalless, Bolton earning themselves a replay at the Macron Stadium two weeks later.

| 3 January 2015 3rd Round | Bolton Wanderers | 1–0 | Wigan Athletic | Macron Stadium, Bolton |
| 15:00 BST | Clough 76' | Report | | Attendance: 16,788; Referee: Phil Dowd |

| 24 January 2015 4th Round | Liverpool | 0–0 | Bolton Wanderers | Anfield, Liverpool |
| 17:30 BST | | Report | | Attendance: 43,847; Referee: Kevin Friend |

| 4 February 2015 Replay | Bolton Wanderers | 1–2 | Liverpool | Macron Stadium, Bolton |
| 19:45 BST | Guðjohnsen 59' (pen.) | Report | Sterling 86'; Coutinho 90+1' | Attendance: 22,171; Referee: Roger East |

== League Cup ==
The draw for the first round of the League Cup was made on 17 June 2014, and resulted in a home tie against local rivals Bury. This would be Bolton's first game against the Shakers since 2002, also in the League Cup, when Bernard Mendy's own goal gave Bury the win. Prior to this, on 11 June, it had been revealed that Bolton were listed as a seeded team in the northern section of the first round draw, meaning they would play one of seventeen unseeded teams, of which Bury were one. Falling behind to a Ryan Lowe strike in the twentieth minute, it took until the sixth minute of added time at the end of the second half for Bolton to equalise, Craig Davies converting from twelve yards after being tripped by former Bolton 'keeper Rob Lainton. In extra time, two Neil Danns goals, the second directly from a free-kick, put the score at 3–1. Jimmy McNulty headed in to narrow the deficit but Bolton held on to progress to the next round and an away tie at Crewe Alexandra. On 27 August, Bolton were handed José Mourinho's Chelsea in the third round of the League Cup.

| 12 August 2014 1st Round | Bolton Wanderers | 3–2 (a.e.t.) | Bury | Macron Stadium |
| 20:00 BST | C. Davies 90+7' (pen.); Danns 93', 96' | Report | Lowe 20'; McNulty 97' | Attendance: 9,249; Referee: Jeremy Simpson |

| 26 August 2014 2nd Round | Crewe Alexandra | 2–3 (a.e.t.) | Bolton Wanderers | Gresty Road |
| 19:45 BST | Inman 2'; Haber 90+8' | Report | Pratley 40'; Beckford 90+2', 107' | Attendance: 2,642; Referee: Tony Harrington |

| 24 September 2014 3rd Round | Chelsea | 2–1 | Bolton Wanderers | Stamford Bridge |
| 19:45 BST | Zouma 25'; Oscar 55' | Report | Mills 31' | Attendance: 40,988; Referee: Graham Scott |

== Squad statistics ==
| No. | Pos. | Name | League | | FA Cup | | League Cup | | Total | | Discipline | |
| No. | Pos. | Name | Apps | Goals | Apps | Goals | Apps | Goals | Apps | Goals | Yellow card | Red card |
|---|---|---|---|---|---|---|---|---|---|---|---|---|
| 1 | GK | (Hungary) Ádám Bogdán | 10 | 0 | 2 | 0 | 1 | 0 | 13 | 0 | 0 | 0 |
| 2 | DF | (Scotland) Kevin McNaughton | 9 | 0 | 0 | 0 | 0 | 0 | 9 | 0 | 0 | 0 |
| 3 | DF | (England) Dean Moxey | 20 | 1 | 2 | 0 | 1 | 0 | 23 | 1 | 5 | 0 |
| 4 | DF | (England) Matt Mills | 37 | 4 | 2 | 0 | 2 | 1 | 41 | 5 | 8 | 1 |
| 5 | DF | (United States) Tim Ream | 44 | 0 | 3 | 0 | 2 | 0 | 49 | 0 | 4 | 0 |
| 6 | MF | (England) Jay Spearing | 21 | 1 | 1 | 0 | 1 | 0 | 23 | 1 | 5 | 0 |
| 7 | MF | (England) Liam Feeney | 41 | 3 | 3 | 0 | 3 | 0 | 47 | 3 | 2 | 0 |
| 8 | MF | (Republic of Ireland) Keith Andrews | 0 | 0 | 0 | 0 | 0 | 0 | 0 | 0 | 0 | 0 |
| 9 | FW | (Republic of Ireland) Joe Mason | 12 | 4 | 0 | 0 | 2 | 0 | 14 | 4 | 0 | 0 |
| 9 | FW | (England) Adam Le Fondre | 17 | 8 | 0 | 0 | 0 | 0 | 17 | 8 | 2 | 0 |
| 10 | FW | (Jamaica) Jermaine Beckford | 11 | 0 | 0 | 0 | 3 | 2 | 14 | 2 | 1 | 0 |
| 11 | MF | (England) Robert Hall | 9 | 0 | 0 | 0 | 1 | 0 | 10 | 0 | 0 | 0 |
| 12 | FW | (England) Max Clayton | 9 | 1 | 0 | 0 | 0 | 0 | 9 | 1 | 0 | 0 |
| 13 | GK | (Republic of Ireland) Paddy Kenny | 0 | 0 | 0 | 0 | 0 | 0 | 0 | 0 | 0 | 0 |
| 13 | GK | (England) Ben Amos | 9 | 0 | 0 | 0 | 0 | 0 | 9 | 0 | 0 | 0 |
| 14 | DF | (France) Dorian Dervite | 37 | 0 | 3 | 0 | 3 | 0 | 43 | 0 | 7 | 1 |
| 15 | DF | (England) Alex Baptiste | 0 | 0 | 0 | 0 | 0 | 0 | 0 | 0 | 0 | 0 |
| 16 | MF | (England) Mark Davies | 15 | 2 | 0 | 0 | 0 | 0 | 15 | 2 | 5 | 0 |
| 17 | MF | (England) Liam Trotter | 14 | 1 | 2 | 0 | 2 | 0 | 18 | 1 | 2 | 0 |
| 18 | MF | (Guyana) Neil Danns | 41 | 1 | 3 | 0 | 3 | 2 | 47 | 3 | 11 | 1 |
| 19 | MF | (Republic of Ireland) Owen Garvan | 3 | 0 | 0 | 0 | 0 | 0 | 3 | 0 | 0 | 0 |
| 19 | FW | (England) Emile Heskey | 16 | 1 | 2 | 0 | 0 | 0 | 18 | 1 | 3 | 0 |
| 20 | DF | (England) Joe Riley | 0 | 0 | 0 | 0 | 0 | 0 | 0 | 0 | 0 | 0 |
| 20 | DF | (Portugal) Rochinha | 4 | 0 | 0 | 0 | 0 | 0 | 4 | 0 | 0 | 0 |
| 21 | MF | (England) Darren Pratley | 22 | 4 | 2 | 0 | 3 | 1 | 27 | 5 | 8 | 0 |
| 22 | FW | (Iceland) Eiður Guðjohnsen | 21 | 5 | 3 | 1 | 0 | 0 | 24 | 6 | 1 | 0 |
| 23 | DF | (England) Marc Tierney | 0 | 0 | 0 | 0 | 0 | 0 | 0 | 0 | 0 | 0 |
| 24 | GK | (England) Andy Lonergan | 29 | 0 | 1 | 0 | 2 | 0 | 32 | 0 | 0 | 0 |
| 25 | MF/DF | (England) Josh Vela | 29 | 0 | 3 | 0 | 0 | 0 | 32 | 0 | 6 | 0 |
| 26 | MF | (England) Andy Hughes | 0 | 0 | 0 | 0 | 0 | 0 | 0 | 0 | 0 | 0 |
| 27 | MF | (South Korea) Lee Chung-Yong | 23 | 3 | 0 | 0 | 3 | 0 | 26 | 3 | 5 | 0 |
| 27 | MF | (Czech Republic) Filip Twardzik | 3 | 1 | 0 | 0 | 0 | 0 | 3 | 1 | 0 | 0 |
| 28 | FW | (Wales) Craig Davies | 27 | 6 | 1 | 0 | 2 | 1 | 30 | 7 | 2 | 0 |
| 29 | DF | (Australia) Chris Herd | 2 | 0 | 0 | 0 | 1 | 0 | 3 | 0 | 3 | 0 |
| 29 | MF | (Scotland) Barry Bannan | 16 | 0 | 0 | 0 | 0 | 0 | 16 | 0 | 2 | 0 |
| 30 | MF | (England) Kaiyne Woolery | 1 | 0 | 0 | 0 | 0 | 0 | 1 | 0 | | 0 |
| 31 | DF | (England) David Wheater | 17 | 1 | 3 | 0 | 1 | 0 | 21 | 1 | 1 | 0 |
| 32 | FW | (England) Tom Eaves | 1 | 0 | 0 | 0 | 0 | 0 | 1 | 0 | 0 | 0 |
| 33 | DF | (England) Hayden White | 3 | 0 | 0 | 0 | 0 | 0 | 3 | 0 | 0 | 0 |
| 34 | GK | (England) Ross Fitzsimons | 0 | 0 | 0 | 0 | 0 | 0 | 0 | 0 | 0 | 0 |
| 35 | FW | (Republic of Ireland) Conor Wilkinson | 4 | 0 | 1 | 0 | 2 | 0 | 7 | 0 | 0 | 0 |
| 37 | DF | (England) Quade Taylor | 1 | 0 | 0 | 0 | 0 | 0 | 1 | 0 | 0 | 0 |
| 38 | FW | (England) Sanmi Odelusi | 0 | 0 | 0 | 0 | 0 | 0 | 0 | 0 | 0 | 0 |
| 39 | MF | (Northern Ireland) Chris Lester | 0 | 0 | 0 | 0 | 1 | 0 | 1 | 0 | 0 | 0 |
| 40 | FW | (England) Zach Clough | 8 | 5 | 2 | 1 | 0 | 0 | 10 | 6 | 0 | 0 |
| 41 | DF | (England) Oscar Threlkeld | 4 | 0 | 0 | 0 | 2 | 0 | 6 | 0 | 1 | 0 |
| 42 | MF | (England) Luke Woodland | 0 | 0 | 0 | 0 | 0 | 0 | 0 | 0 | 0 | 0 |
| 43 | DF | (England) Andy Kellett | 1 | 0 | 0 | 0 | 0 | 0 | 1 | 0 | 0 | 0 |
| 44 | MF | (Sierra Leone) Medo Kamara | 5 | 0 | 0 | 0 | 1 | 0 | 6 | 0 | 0 | 0 |
| 45 | FW | (England) Tom Youngs | 0 | 0 | 0 | 0 | 0 | 0 | 0 | 0 | 0 | 0 |
| 45 | MF | (Bulgaria) Simeon Slavchev | 1 | 0 | 0 | 0 | 0 | 0 | 1 | 0 | 0 | 0 |
| 46 | FW | (Bulgaria) Georg Iliev | 0 | 0 | 0 | 0 | 0 | 0 | 0 | 0 | 0 | 0 |
| 47 | DF/MF | (Switzerland) Saidy Janko | 10 | 1 | 0 | 0 | 0 | 0 | 10 | 1 | 2 | 0 |
| 48 | MF | (England) Niall Maher | 0 | 0 | 0 | 0 | 0 | 0 | 0 | 0 | 0 | 0 |
| 49 | MF | (England) Aaron Knight | 0 | 0 | 0 | 0 | 0 | 0 | 0 | 0 | 0 | 0 |
| 50 | MF | (England) Ryan Sellars | 0 | 0 | 0 | 0 | 0 | 0 | 0 | 0 | 0 | 0 |
| 51 | MF | (England) Giles Coke | 4 | 0 | 0 | 0 | 0 | 0 | 4 | 0 | 0 | 0 |
| 52 | MF | (England) Tom Walker | 11 | 1 | 0 | 0 | 0 | 0 | 11 | 1 | 2 | 0 |
| 54 | DF | (Republic of Ireland) Paddy McCarthy | 5 | 0 | 0 | 0 | 0 | 0 | 5 | 0 | 0 | 0 |
| – | – | Own goals | – | - | – | - | – | - | – | - | | |

== Transfers ==
=== Summer ===
Bolton's first move of the transfer window was confirmed on 28 April 2014, with loanee Neil Danns signing a pre-contract which would see him move to the club on a one-year deal once his existing contract with Leicester City expired on 30 June.

On 5 May 2014, it was announced that four senior players would not have their contracts renewed. Club captain Zat Knight, Chris Eagles, Tyrone Mears and Jay Lynch were all released. On the same day the club confirmed that academy players Sam Bailey, Saul Hamer, Jordan Hendrie, James Kelly, Elliot Newby and Guillermo Torres would not have their contracts extended.

On 12 May, Bolton confirmed that another loanee from the previous season would be joining the club following the expiring of his current contract in the summer. Following Neil Danns' example, Liam Trotter would join the club on 1 July, signing a three-year deal, leaving Millwall after four years of service. On 19 May, Bolton confirmed that Liam Feeney, another ex-loanee, would be following Trotter from Millwall after signing a two-year deal, having been at Millwall for three years. On 21 May, Bolton signed their fourth former loanee in a row, with Andy Robinson of Southampton joining on a one-year deal. However, on 19 July the club confirmed the player had left as he had failed to settle in the area. Bolton's fifth signing of the summer was confirmed as former Tottenham defender Dorian Dervite, who signed a three-year deal, joining from Charlton Athletic. Bolton continued their summer signing spree by announcing on 12 June that Crystal Palace youth goalkeeper Ross Fitzsimons would officially become a Trotter on 1 July, with the 'keeper signing a two-year contract.

On 1 July, as well as confirming the arrivals of the six previously announced signings, Bolton revealed that André Moritz and Arran Lee-Barrett would leave the club following the expiration of their contracts. Both had been discussing the option of a contract extension.

The following day, on 2 July, Bolton announced the signing of Crystal Palace left-back Dean Moxey, with whom Freedman had previously worked during his time with the Eagles. Two days later, striker Marvin Sordell left Bolton to join near neighbours Burnley in the Premier League, rejoining his former manager at Watford, Sean Dyche. Defender Alex Baptiste, recently arrested on suspicion of actual bodily harm, was loaned to Blackburn Rovers on 11 July.

A fifth former loanee, Kevin McNaughton, joined the club on 16 July, signing on for another loan spell. On 19 July, Andy Robinson, who had only joined the club at the beginning of the month, had his contract cancelled with homesickness being cited as the reason.

Shortly after, experienced utility man Andy Hughes joined the club as a professional development coach, while also be registered as a member of the playing staff. Keith Andrews then joined Watford on loan on 24 July, before Bolton signed young defender Quade Taylor on a free from Crystal Palace and Joe Riley joined Oxford United on loan until January, both on 28 July. Young defender Cian Bolger left the club on 5 August, joining Phil Brown's Southend United.

Former Plymouth man Joe Mason rejoined the club on 11 August, signing on for another loan spell until the end of the 2014–15 season from Cardiff City, with whom he had recently agreed a new contract. The first released Bolton player to join a new club was 'keeper Jay Lynch, who joined Accrington Stanley on non-contract terms on 8 August, although he later joined Salford City.

Bolton's first signing of the emergency loan window was to loan Owen Garvan from Crystal Palace until December. Two days later Conor Wilkinson joined League One team Oldham Athletic on loan for a month. Right-back Hayden White was also sent out on loan, joining Carlisle United for a month. Coming the other way, Max Clayton joined after compensation was agreed with his former club Crewe Alexandra. Clayton had trained with Bolton earlier in the summer following his turning down of a contract extension from the Railwaymen. The BBC reported a figure of £300,000 could be given to Crewe. A day later, Paddy Kenny released by Leeds United following rumours Massimo Cellino had dropped him because he considers the 'keeper's birth date to be unlucky. The Irishman signed for Bolton on a short-term deal to cover for the absent Ádám Bogdán, who had been injured while in training. The club's third signing in six days, Chris Herd joined Bolton from Aston Villa until 8 November.

==== In ====
| Date | Pos. | Name | From | Fee | Ref. |
|---|---|---|---|---|---|
| 1 July 2014 | MF | Neil Danns (ENG) | Leicester City (ENG) | Free | |
| 1 July 2014 | DF | Dorian Dervite (FRA) | Charlton Athletic (ENG) | Free | |
| 1 July 2014 | MF | Liam Feeney (ENG) | Millwall (ENG) | Free | |
| 1 July 2014 | GK | Ross Fitzsimons (ENG) | Crystal Palace (ENG) | Free | |
| 1 July 2014 | MF | Andy Robinson (ENG) | Southampton (ENG) | Free | |
| 1 July 2014 | MF | Liam Trotter (ENG) | Millwall (ENG) | Free | |
| 2 July 2014 | DF | Dean Moxey (ENG) | Crystal Palace (ENG) | Free | |
| 22 July 2014 | MF | Andy Hughes (ENG) | Charlton Athletic (ENG) | Free | |
| 28 July 2014 | DF | Quade Taylor (ENG) | Crystal Palace (ENG) | Free | |
| 14 August 2014 | FW | Kaiyne Woolery (ENG) | Tamworth (ENG) | £10,000 | |
| 18 September 2014 | FW | Max Clayton (ENG) | Crewe Alexandra (ENG) | £300,000 | |
| 19 September 2014 | GK | Paddy Kenny (IRL) | Leeds United (ENG) | Free | |
| 5 December 2014 | FW | Eiður Guðjohnsen (ISL) | Club Brugge (BEL) | Free | |
| 24 December 2014 | FW | Emile Heskey (ENG) | Newcastle Jets (AUS) | Free | |
| 2 February 2015 | MF | Filip Twardzik (CZE) | Celtic (SCO) | Free | |

==== Out ====
| Date | Pos. | Name | To | Fee | Ref. |
|---|---|---|---|---|---|
| 30 June 2014 | MF | Chris Eagles (ENG) | Blackpool (ENG) | Free | |
| 30 June 2014 | DF | Zat Knight (ENG) | Colorado Rapids (USA) | Free | |
| 30 June 2014 | GK | Arran Lee-Barrett (ENG) | Released | Free | |
| 30 June 2014 | GK | Jay Lynch (ENG) | Accrington Stanley (ENG) | Free | |
| 30 June 2014 | DF | Tyrone Mears (ENG) | Seattle Sounders (USA) | Free | |
| 30 June 2014 | MF | André Moritz (BRA) | Pohang Steelers (KOR) | Free | |
| 30 June 2014 | MF | Sam Bailey (ENG) | Released | Free | |
| 30 June 2014 | FW | Saul Hamer (ENG) | Released | Free | |
| 30 June 2014 | DF | Jordan Hendrie (ENG) | Bradford City (ENG) | Free | |
| 30 June 2014 | MF | James Kelly (ENG) | Bala Town (WAL) | Free | |
| 30 June 2014 | MF | Elliot Newby (ENG) | Aston Villa (ENG) | Free | |
| 30 June 2014 | FW | Guillermo Torres (ESP) | Released | Free | |
| 4 July 2014 | FW | Marvin Sordell (ENG) | Burnley (ENG) | £567,000 | |
| 19 July 2014 | MF | Andy Robinson (ENG) | Gosport Borough (ENG) | Free | |
| 5 August 2014 | DF | Cian Bolger (IRL) | Southend United (ENG) | Undisclosed | |
| 17 September 2014 | MF | Yannick Bastos (LUX) | Released | Free | |
| 14 January 2015 | DF | Joe Riley (ENG) | Bury (ENG) | Free | |
| 20 January 2015 | GK | Paddy Kenny (IRL) | Ipswich Town (ENG) | Free | |
| 23 January 2015 | FW | Tom Youngs (ENG) | Released | Free | |
| 2 February 2015 | MF | Lee Chung-yong (KOR) | Crystal Palace (ENG) | Undisclosed | |

==== Loan in ====
| Date from | Date to | Pos. | Name | From | Ref. |
|---|---|---|---|---|---|
| 16 July 2014 | 30 June 2015 | DF | Kevin McNaughton (SCO) | Cardiff City (WAL) | |
| 11 August 2014 | 19 January 2015 | FW | Joe Mason (IRL) | Cardiff City (WAL) | |
| 10 September 2014 | 12 December 2014 | MF | Owen Garvan (IRL) | Crystal Palace (ENG) | |
| 23 September 2014 | 8 November 2014 | DF | Chris Herd (AUS) | Aston Villa (ENG) | |
| 26 January 2015 | 30 June 2015 | MF | Rochinha (POR) | Benfica B (POR) | |
| 26 January 2015 | 30 June 2015 | FW | Adam Le Fondre (ENG) | Cardiff City (WAL) | |
| 30 January 2015 | 4 April 2015 | GK | Ben Amos (ENG) | Manchester United (ENG) | |
| 2 February 2015 | 30 June 2015 | MF | Simeon Slavchev (BUL) | Sporting CP (POR) | |
| 2 February 2015 | 30 June 2015 | MF | Barry Bannan (SCO) | Crystal Palace (ENG) | |
| 2 February 2015 | 30 June 2015 | MF | Saidy Janko (SUI) | Manchester United (ENG) | |
| 12 February 2015 | 30 June 2015 | DF | Matija Boben (SVN) | NK Ivančna Gorica (SVN) | |
| 5 March 2015 | 30 June 2015 | MF | Giles Coke (ENG) | Sheffield Wednesday (ENG) | |
| 10 March 2015 | 30 June 2015 | DF | Paddy McCarthy (IRL) | Crystal Palace (ENG) | |
| 26 March 2015 | 30 June 2015 | MF | Jordan Lussey (ENG) | Liverpool (ENG) | |

==== Loan out ====
| Date from | Date to | Pos. | Name | To | Ref. |
|---|---|---|---|---|---|
| 11 July 2014 | 30 June 2015 | DF | Alex Baptiste (ENG) | Blackburn Rovers (ENG) | |
| 24 July 2014 | 31 January 2015 | MF | Keith Andrews (IRL) | Watford (ENG) | |
| 28 July 2014 | 1 January 2015 | DF | Joe Riley (ENG) | Oxford United (ENG) | |
| 12 September 2014 | 11 October 2014 | FW | Conor Wilkinson (IRL) | Oldham Athletic (ENG) | |
| 18 September 2014 | 6 November 2014 | DF | Hayden White (ENG) | Carlisle United (ENG) | |
| 17 October 2014 | 13 December 2014 | DF | Andy Kellett (ENG) | Plymouth Argyle (ENG) | |
| 17 October 2014 | 15 November 2014 | FW | Georg Iliev (BUL) | Carlisle United (ENG) | |
| 7 November 2014 | 4 January 2015 | DF | Hayden White (ENG) | Bury (ENG) | |
| 20 November 2014 | 30 June 2015 | FW | Jermaine Beckford (ENG) | Preston North End (ENG) | |
| 27 November 2014 | 5 January 2015 | FW | Tom Youngs (ENG) | Oldham Athletic (ENG) | |
| 27 November 2014 | 5 January 2015 | FW | Tom Eaves (ENG) | Yeovil Town (ENG) | |
| 27 November 2014 | 5 January 2015 | GK | Paddy Kenny (IRL) | Oldham Athletic (ENG) | |
| 19 January 2015 | 2 March 2015 | DF | Hayden White (ENG) | Notts County (ENG) | |
| 19 January 2015 | 30 June 2015 | MF | Medo Kamara (SLE) | Maccabi Haifa (ISR) | |
| 22 January 2015 | 30 June 2015 | DF | Niall Maher (ENG) | Blackpool (ENG) | |
| 26 January 2015 | 26 February 2015 | DF | Glenn Matthews (ENG) | Telford United (ENG) | |
| 29 January 2015 | 28 February 2015 | FW | Kaiyne Woolery (ENG) | Notts County (ENG) | |
| 30 January 2015 | 30 June 2015 | MF | Jay Spearing (ENG) | Blackburn Rovers (ENG) | |
| 31 January 2015 | 30 June 2015 | MF | Sanmi Odelusi (ENG) | Coventry City (ENG) | |
| 2 February 2015 | 30 June 2015 | FW | Conor Wilkinson (IRL) | Oldham Athletic (ENG) | |
| 2 February 2015 | 30 June 2015 | MF | Keith Andrews (IRL) | Milton Keynes Dons (ENG) | |
| 2 February 2015 | 30 June 2015 | DF | Andy Kellett (ENG) | Manchester United (ENG) | |
| 13 March 2015 | 11 April 2015 | MF | Luke Woodland (ENG) | Oldham Athletic (ENG) | |
| 14 March 2015 | 30 June 2015 | MF | Tom Eaves (ENG) | Bury (ENG) | |
| 26 March 2015 | 30 June 2015 | DF | Rob Holding (ENG) | Bury (ENG) | |
| 26 March 2015 | 30 June 2015 | MF | Rob Hall (ENG) | Milton Keynes Dons (ENG) | |
