= Jermaine Beckford =

English footballer & pundit (born 1983)

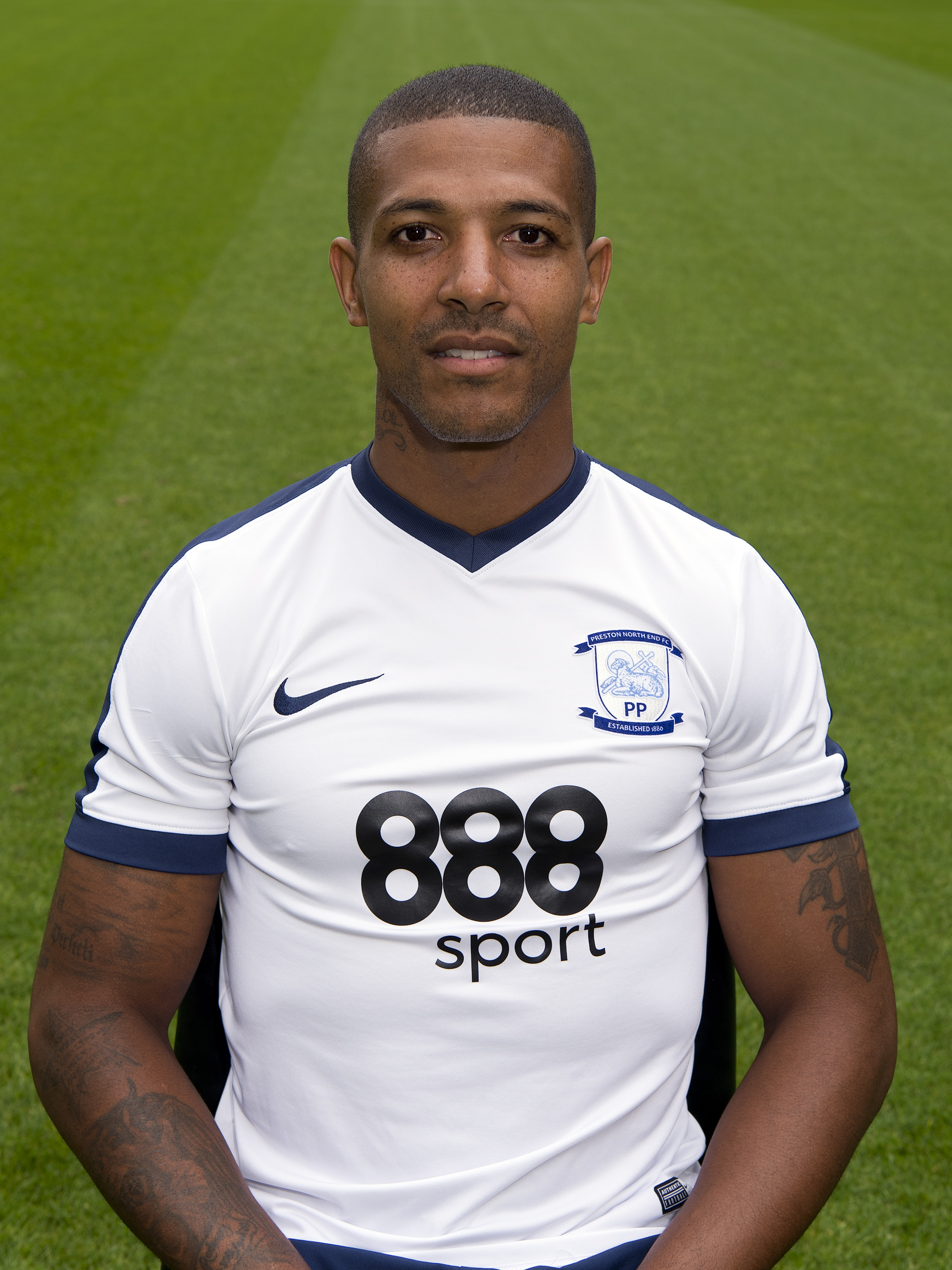
- Beckford in 2016

Personal information
- Full name: Jermaine Paul Alexander Beckford
- Date of birth: 9 December 1983 (age 42)
- Place of birth: Ealing, England
- Height: 1.88 m (6 ft 2 in)
- Position: Striker

Youth career
- 2000–2003: Chelsea

Senior career*
Years	Team	Apps	(Gls)
2003–2006	Wealdstone	82	(54)
2003–2004	→ Uxbridge (loan)	8	(2)
2006–2010	Leeds United	126	(71)
2006	→ Carlisle United (loan)	4	(1)
2007	→ Scunthorpe United (loan)	18	(8)
2010–2011	Everton	34	(8)
2011–2013	Leicester City	43	(9)
2012–2013	→ Huddersfield Town (loan)	21	(8)
2013–2015	Bolton Wanderers	46	(7)
2014–2015	→ Preston North End (loan)	23	(12)
2015–2017	Preston North End	28	(3)
2017–2019	Bury	16	(8)
Total		449	(191)

International career
2013	Jamaica	6	(1)
- * Club domestic league appearances and goals

Jermaine Paul Alexander Beckford (born 9 December 1983) is a football pundit and former professional footballer who played as a striker. He began his career as a trainee at Chelsea, and played for Wealdstone, Uxbridge, Leeds United, Carlisle United, Scunthorpe United, Everton, Leicester City, Huddersfield Town, Bolton Wanderers, Preston North End and Bury. He also represented Jamaica at international level.

== Club career ==
=== Wealdstone ===
Beckford originally began his career in the Chelsea youth team, coming through the schoolboy ranks at the same time as Carlton Cole. Rejected by Chelsea in 2003, he was signed up by Wealdstone, then in the Isthmian Premier League, and played as a semi-professional for three years whilst also working as a windscreen fitter for the RAC. His very impressive goal scoring record for Wealdstone attracted a lot of attention from Football League sides and reportedly more than 30 professional clubs showed an interest in the prolific striker, with many sending scouts to watch him play for Wealdstone. He had a trial with Championship side Crystal Palace, before signing for Leeds United in March 2006 for an undisclosed fee, having scored 35 goals in 40 games for Wealdstone that season.

=== Leeds United ===
Beckford made his debut for Championship side Leeds coming on as a substitute in a home defeat against Crystal Palace on 21 March. He only made four more first team appearances. He joined Carlisle United on a month's loan on 5 October 2006 and scored on his debut for the club in a game against Millwall. After completing his loan spell, he returned to Leeds, made a single appearance, and was loaned out again, this time to League One promotion challengers Scunthorpe United until the end of the season. He played in every single game after his arrival, scoring eight goals, as Scunthorpe went on to finish as champions.

Returning to Leeds for the 2007–08 season (their first—of three—in League One), Beckford scored his first competitive goal for the club in a 4–1 victory against Southend United on 18 August. Beckford signed a new three-year deal with Leeds, keeping him at the club until the end of the 2009–10 season, and won October 2007's League One Fans' Player of the Month award. In March 2008 he won two awards at the third annual Football League Awards at Grosvenor House Hotel in London – League One Player of the Year and the Football League Goal of the Year, for his strike against Rotherham United during his loan spell with Scunthorpe United.

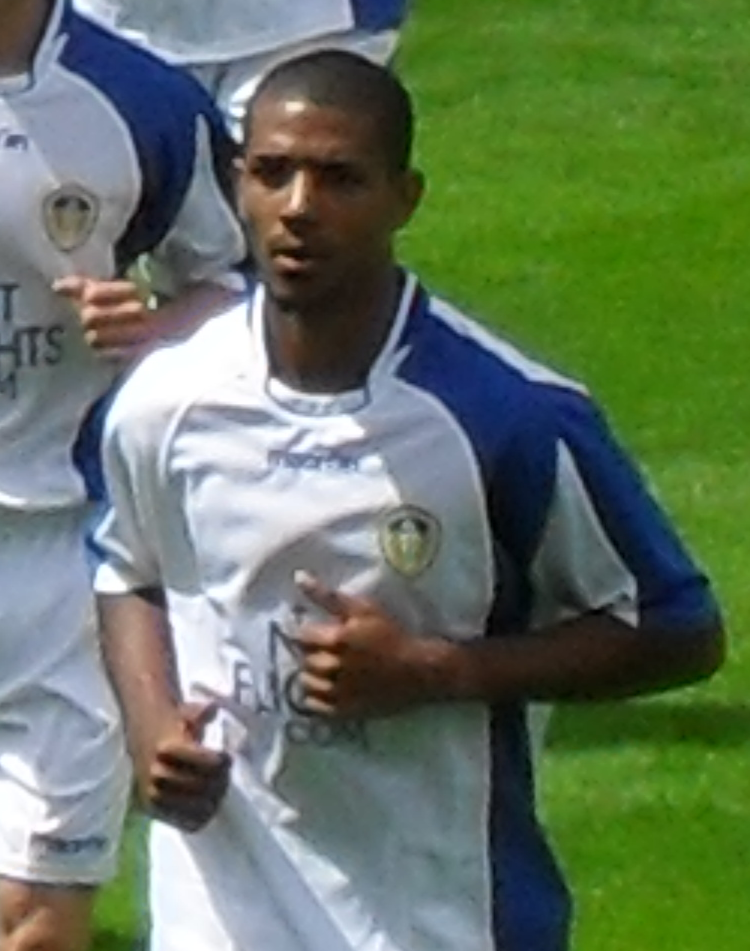
Beckford playing for Leeds United in 2009

Beckford started the 2008–09 season by scoring ten goals in eight starts, including his first ever professional hat-trick as Leeds beat League Two side Chester City in the first round of the League Cup. By the end of the season he had scored 27 goals in all competitions and was offered a new contract by the club. After initially rejecting it, he was transfer listed. Two bids for Beckford were rejected by Leeds, and then he was removed from the transfer list, remaining at the club.

By the end of December in the 2009–10 season Beckford already had 18 goals for the season and, with interest from Newcastle United reported, he handed in a transfer request. He came to further prominence scoring the only goal as Leeds beat old rivals Manchester United in the third round of the FA Cup – the first time they had been knocked out of a competition so early under Alex Ferguson. Beckford then withdrew his transfer request days before scoring twice in the FA Cup fourth round, taking Tottenham Hotspur to a replay. By the end of the season Beckford had scored 31 goals in all competitions, 25 in the league, as Leeds finished in second place to gain automatic promotion to the Championship. He won Leeds United's goal of the season at Leeds' annual Player of the Season awards for his goal against Manchester United at Old Trafford. Following the end of the season, in May 2010, Leeds cancelled Beckford's contract a month early to enable him to find a new club.

=== Everton ===
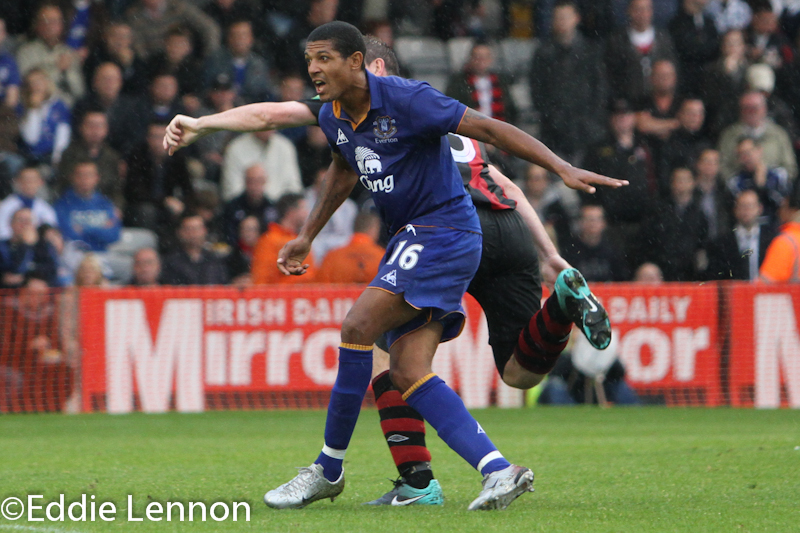
Beckford playing for Everton, 2011

In May 2010, Beckford signed for Everton on a four-year contract on a free transfer and was given squad number 16. After playing and scoring in pre-season friendlies Beckford made his Everton debut as a second-half substitute against Blackburn Rovers and his full debut a week later at home to Wolverhampton Wanderers. He scored his first goal for the club, a penalty, against Huddersfield Town in the League Cup in August 2010 and an injury-time equaliser at home against his future employers Bolton Wanderers in November 2010 was Beckford's first league goal for the Toffees. He also scored at Anfield against Liverpool in the Merseyside derby. In the last game of the season he scored a solo goal in a 1–0 win against Chelsea at Goodison Park. At the end of his debut season for Everton he had scored eight goals in the league and ten in all competitions.

=== Leicester City ===
On 31 August 2011, Everton accepted a £2.5 million bid for Beckford from Championship side Leicester City. Beckford arrived at the King Power Stadium just 40 minutes before the summer transfer window closed to sign a four-year contract, making him Leicester City's 12th signing of the summer. He scored his first goal for the club in a 2–0 win over Watford on 19 October 2011. On 17 January, Beckford scored his first hat-trick for Leicester, in a 4–0 FA Cup win over Nottingham Forest – Leicester's rivals. He scored a brace against Swindon Town in the FA Cup, and scored two more braces in March 2012, in a 3–1 win against Birmingham City, and a 3–3 draw against Blackpool.

On 28 September 2012, it was announced that Jermaine Beckford had joined Huddersfield Town on a 93-day emergency loan until 29 December, following a week training with the Leicester City under 21 squad and a failed loan bid from the same club on 31 August. He made his debut the following day in the 3–2 loss to Watford at the John Smith's Stadium. He scored his first goal for the club in the 1–0 win over Birmingham City at St Andrew's on 6 October 2012.

=== Bolton Wanderers ===
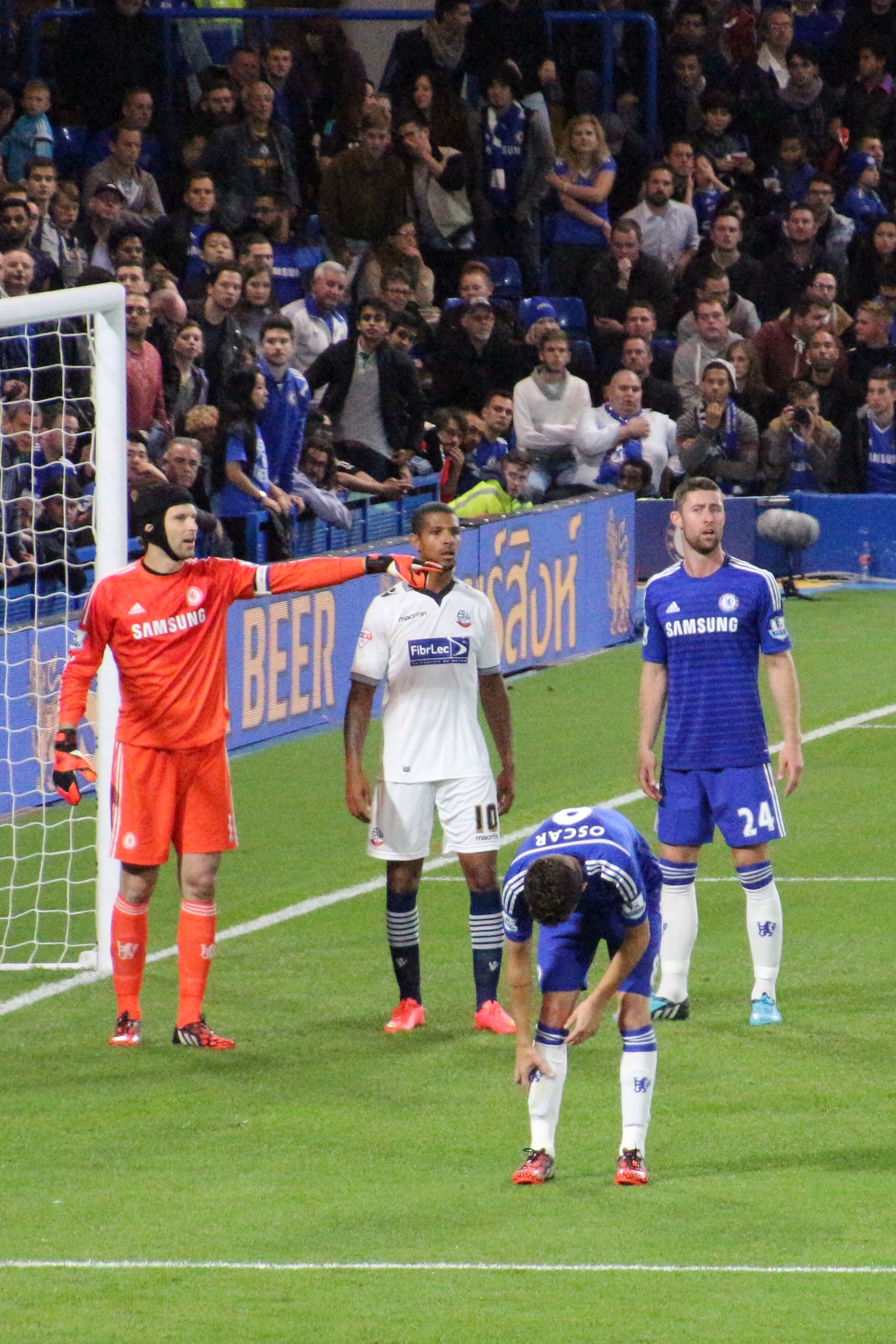
Beckford (wearing white) playing for Bolton Wanderers against Chelsea in the League Cup in 2014

On 17 July 2013, he moved to Bolton Wanderers for an undisclosed fee, signing a two-year contract. He made his debut for Bolton in their 1–1 draw with Lancashire rivals Burnley on 3 August 2013, playing eighty minutes before being replaced by Craig Davies. His first goal came in the League Cup second round, as he scored against Tranmere Rovers in a 1–1 draw; he also scored one of the penalties in the penalty shoot-out that Bolton ultimately ended up losing 4–2.

He scored his first league goal for Bolton in their 2–1 win away at Birmingham City which coincided with the club's first league win of the new season. Whilst not getting off to the best start, goals started to come with him scoring 5 in 6 in matches against Sheffield Wednesday, AFC Bournemouth, Millwall and Watford and the aforementioned Birmingham. Striker Joe Mason joined Bolton on 11 November 2013, on a short-term loan deal. This saw Beckford dropped to the bench for a while, until returning to the starting line up and scoring against his former club Leicester City on 30 December 2013. Bolton went on to lose the game 5–3.

Beckford's first goal of the 2014–15 season came on 26 August 2014, scoring twice in the League Cup against Crewe Alexandra.

=== Preston North End ===
On 20 November 2014 he signed for Preston North End on loan until the end of the 2014–15 season, linking up with his former Leeds manager Simon Grayson once again. Five days later his North End debut came, in a Football League Trophy match at Oldham Athletic; his first league appearance for Preston was on 29 November against Yeovil Town. The frontman scored his first goal for Preston against Peterborough United on 20 December, and his last of 2014 eight days later against Crewe.

He rediscovered his form, and in total he scored 18 goals for Preston in 31 appearances in all competitions, including a hat-trick in the play-off final at Wembley against Swindon Town on 24 May 2015 to win the club promotion to the Championship.

After being released by Bolton Wanderers, Beckford signed a permanent two-year contract with Preston North End effective from 1 July 2015. Beckford made ten league appearances plus one in the League Cup in his first full season at North End, scoring twice.

Beckford's first goal of the 2016–17 season came on 20 August 2016 in a 2–0 win over Queens Park Rangers. He was sent off in a defeat to Sheffield Wednesday on 3 December for fighting with fellow North Ender Eoin Doyle, who was also red carded. His return from suspension for the Lilywhites lasted only three minutes as Beckford was sent off again, on 26 December against his former club Leeds United, for kicking Leeds' Kyle Bartley.

=== Bury ===
Following his release from Preston, Beckford signed a two-year deal with Bury on 15 May 2017. Beckford scored his first goal for Bury on 5 August against Walsall in a 1–0 win. He started a total of 15 matches for the club, plus three appearances as a substitute, and scored eight goals.

Having missed most of the 2018–19 season with a persistent injury, on 27 August 2019 Beckford announced his decision to retire from football at the age of 35.

== International career ==
Due to having a Jamaican father and Grenadian mother Beckford was eligible under FIFA regulations to play for either Jamaica, Grenada or England.

Beckford was approached by Grenada's coach Tommy Taylor with a view to playing for the Grenada national football team in May 2009. In May 2011, the Jamaica Star reported that Beckford was close to finalising an agreement to play for Jamaica.

In November 2012, the Jamaican Football Federation reported that Beckford had shown interest playing for the Reggae Boyz and was in the pool of players eligible to be called up for the 2014 FIFA World Cup qualifiers.

On 31 January 2013, Beckford was called up to the Jamaica squad for the first time for Jamaica's fixture against Mexico, but had to pull out of the squad a day later with an injury.

Beckford made a total of six appearances for Jamaica, scoring one goal in a FIFA World Cup qualifying match against the United States in June 2013.

== Personal life ==
Since retiring, Beckford has made numerous television appearances as a football pundit. His younger brother, Travis, won the first series of Wayne Rooney's Street Striker on Sky1.

Before signing a contract at Leeds United, Beckford worked for the RAC.

== Career statistics ==
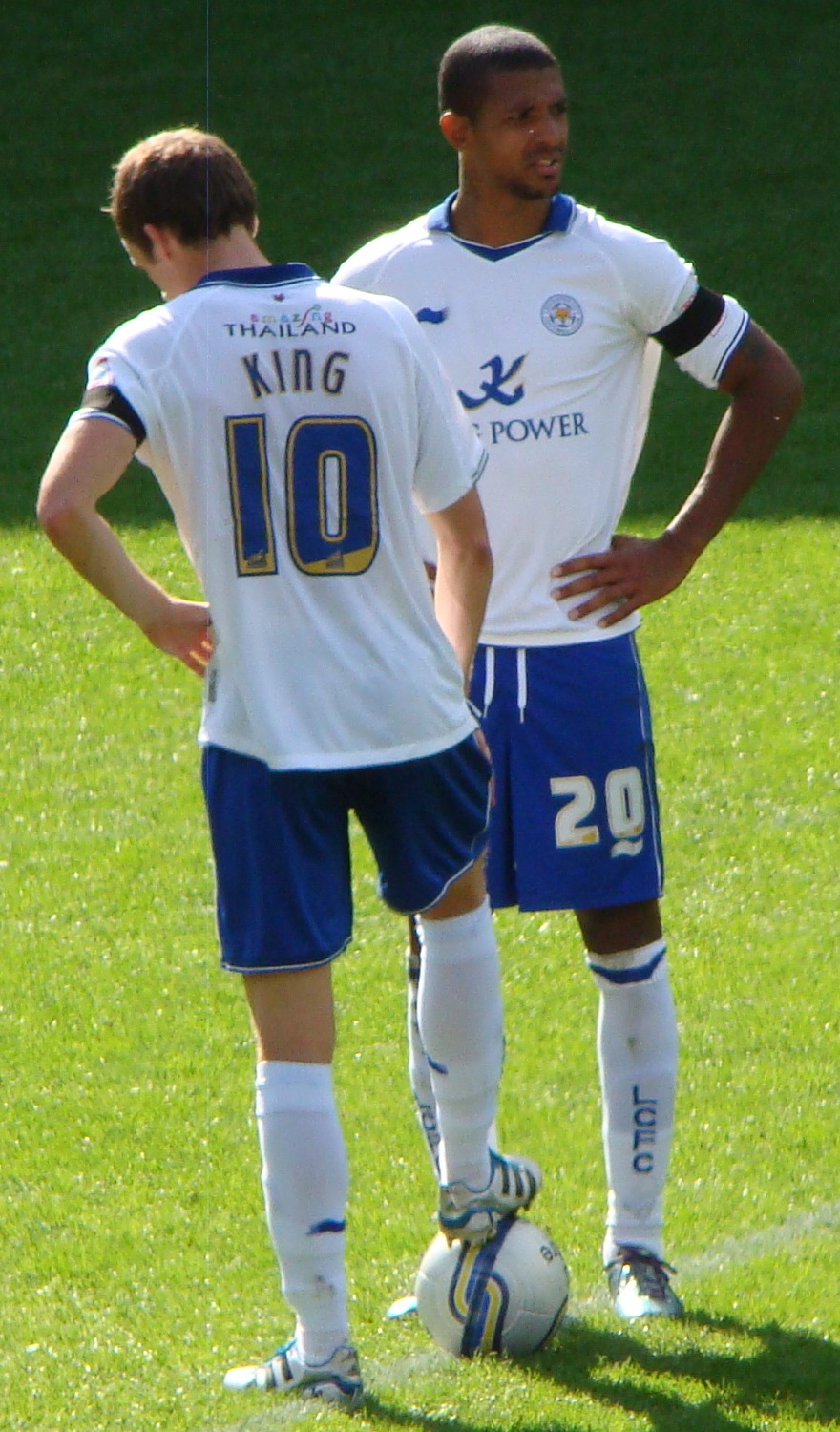
Beckford (right) playing for Leicester City in 2011

=== Club ===
Appearances and goals by club, season and competition
Club	Season	League			FA Cup		League Cup		Other		Total	
Club	Season	Division	Apps	Goals	Apps	Goals	Apps	Goals	Apps	Goals	Apps	Goals
Leeds United	2005–06	Championship	5	0	—		—		0	0	5	0
Leeds United	2006–07	Championship	5	0	0	0	1	0	—		6	0
Leeds United	2007–08	League One	40	20	2	0	2	0	3 (Note: Appearances in EFL League One play-offs.)	0	47	20
Leeds United	2008–09	League One	34	27	1	3	4	4	3 (Note: One appearance in EFL Trophy; two in EFL League One play-offs.)	0	42	34
Leeds United	2009–10	League One	42	25	6	5	2	0	2 (Note: Appearances in EFL Trophy.)	1	52	31
Leeds United	Total		126	72	9	8	9	4	8	1	152	85
Carlisle United (loan)	2006–07	League One	4	1	—		—		1	0	5	1
Scunthorpe United (loan)	2006–07	League One	18	8	—		—		—		18	8
Everton	2010–11	Premier League	32	8	4	1	2	1	—		38	10
Everton	2011–12	Premier League	2	0	—		—		—		2	0
Everton	Total		34	8	4	1	2	1	—		40	10
Leicester City	2011–12	Championship	39	9	5	6	0	0	—		44	15
Leicester City	2012–13	Championship	4	0	—		1	0	—		5	0
Leicester City	Total		43	9	5	6	1	0	—		49	15
Huddersfield Town (loan)	2012–13	Championship	21	8	1	1	—		—		22	9
Bolton Wanderers	2013–14	Championship	33	7	1	1	1	1	—		35	9
Bolton Wanderers	2014–15	Championship	13	0	—		3	2	—		16	2
Bolton Wanderers	Total		46	7	1	1	4	3	—		51	11
Preston North End (loan)	2014–15	League One	23	12	2	0	—		6 (Note: Three appearances in EFL Trophy; three in EFL League One play-offs.)	6	31	18
Preston North End	2015–16	Championship	10	2	0	0	1	0	—		11	2
Preston North End	2016–17	Championship	18	1	0	0	1	0	—		18	1
Preston North End	Total		51	15	2	0	1	0	6	6	60	21
Bury	2017–18	League One	15	8	0	0	1	0	0	0	16	8
Bury	2018–19	League Two	1	0	0	0	0	0	0	0	1	0
Bury	Total		16	8	0	0	1	0	0	0	17	8
Career total			359	136	22	17	17	8	15	7	414	168

=== International ===
Appearances and goals by national team and year
National team	Year	Apps	Goals
Jamaica	2013	6	1
Total		6	1

Scores and results list Jamaica's goal tally first, score column indicates score after each Beckford goal.

List of international goals scored by Jermaine Beckford
No.	Date	Venue	Cap	Opponent	Score	Result	Competition
1	7 June 2013	Independence Park, Kingston, Jamaica	4	United States	1–1	1–2	2014 FIFA World Cup qualification

== Honours ==
Scunthorpe United

- Football League One: 2006–07

Leeds United

- Football League One second-place promotion: 2009–10

Preston North End

- Football League One play-offs: 2015

Individual

- PFA Team of the Year: 2007–08 League One
- PFA Fans' Player of the Year: 2008–09 League One
- Football League One Player of the Month: September 2008, December 2009, April 2015
- Football League One Player of the Year: 2007–08, 2009–10
- Football League Goal of the Year: 2007–08
- Leeds United Player of the Year: 2007–08, 2008–09
