= Tom Youngs (footballer, born 1994) =

English footballer

Personal information
- Full name: Thomas Ronald Youngs
- Date of birth: 6 September 1994 (age 32)
- Place of birth: Greenwich, England
- Position: Forward

Youth career
- –2011: Gillingham
- 2011–2013: Bolton Wanderers

Senior career*
Years	Team	Apps	(Gls)
2013–2015	Bolton Wanderers	1	(0)
2014	→ Oldham Athletic (loan)	0	(0)
2016	Cray Wanderers	?	(14)
2016	Greenwich Borough	10	(6)
2016–	VCD Athletic	0	(0)
2018–2019	Myrtleford Savoy	0	(0)
- * Club domestic league appearances and goals as of 22:00, 19 February 2016 (UTC)

Thomas Ronald Youngs (born 6 September 1994) is an English football forward who plays for VCD Athletic.

== Career ==
Youngs started his professional career at Bolton Wanderers, regularly playing in the reserve side. A product of the youth system, he made his début in the League Cup tie away to Tranmere Rovers on 27 August 2013, coming on as an extra time substitute for Rob Hall.

His league début came on 26 April 2014, in a 3–1 win against Sheffield Wednesday, coming on as a late substitute for Chung-Yong Lee.

On 27 October 2014, he joined Oldham Athletic on a month's loan, becoming one of three fellow Wanderers players to make the temporary move to Boundary Park in as many months, the others being Conor Wilkinson and Paddy Kenny.

He failed to feature in any of Oldham's matches for the duration of his loan spell and returned to Bolton. On 23 January 2015 his contract with Bolton was cancelled by mutual consent.

He signed for Cray Wanderers in February 2016, but made only one appearance.

In March 2016, he signed for Southern East Counties League side Greenwich Borough and made 10 appearances in the rest of the 2015–16 season, scoring 6 goals, as Greenwich Borough were promoted as Champions. He agreed to stay on with Greenwich Borough for the 2016–17 season as they competed in the Isthmian Division One South.

In 2018 he moved to Australia to play for Myrtleford Savoy SC.
