= Georg Iliev =

Bulgarian footballer

Personal information
- Full name: Georg Georgiev Iliev
- Date of birth: 23 October 1994 (age 32)
- Place of birth: Sofia, Bulgaria
- Height: 1.75 m (5 ft 9 in)
- Position: Midfielder

Youth career
- –2011: CSKA Sofia
- 2011–2014: Bolton Wanderers

Senior career*
Years	Team	Apps	(Gls)
2014–2015	Bolton Wanderers	0	(0)
2014	→ Carlisle United (loan)	4	(0)
2016	Slavia Sofia	1	(0)

International career
2010	Bulgaria U17	3	(0)
2012–2013	Bulgaria U19	6	(1)
2013–2016	Bulgaria U21	7	(1)
- * Club domestic league appearances and goals as of 9 January 2017

Georg Georgiev Iliev (Bulgarian: Георг Илиев; born 23 October 1994) is a Bulgarian professional footballer who plays as a midfielder.

== Club career ==
Born in Sofia, Bulgaria, Iliev kicked off his youth career with the local club CSKA Sofia before being transferred to Bolton Wanderers youth academy in 2011. In 2014, he signed a professional contract with the club.

On 17 October 2014, Iliev joined League Two side Carlisle United on a month-long loan deal. He made his debut against Plymouth Argyle playing the whole 90 minutes of the match. He returned to Bolton at the end of the month loan, having made four appearances.

On 15 May 2015, Bolton announced that Iliev had been released, along with 12 other players.

On 31 January 2016, it was announced that Slavia Sofia had signed Iliev as a free agent, but was released a year later.

== Career statistics ==
=== Club ===
As of 18 November 2015

Club performance			League		Cup		Continental		Other		Total	
Club	League	Season	Apps	Goals	Apps	Goals	Apps	Goals	Apps	Goals	Apps	Goals
England			League		FA Cup		Europe		Other (Note: Includes Football League Cup matches.)		Total	
Bolton Wanderers	Championship	2013–14	0	0	0	0	–		–		0	0
Carlisle United (loan)	League One	2014–15	4	0	0	0	–		–		4	0
Bolton Wanderers	Championship	2014–15	0	0	0	0	–		–		0	0
Bolton Wanderers	Total		0	0	0	0	0	0	0	0	0	0
Bulgaria			League		Bulgarian Cup		Europe		Other (Note: Includes Bulgarian Supercup matches.)		Total	
Slavia Sofia	A Group	2015–16	0	0	0	0	–		–		0	0
Slavia Sofia	Total		0	0	0	0	0	0	0	0	0	0
Career statistics			4	0	0	0	0	0	0	0	4	0
