= The City: London and the Global Power of Finance =

- Cover art for The City.
- Author: Tony Norfield
- Language: English
- Subject: Economics, City of London
- Published: London
- Publisher: Verso Books
- Publication date: 2016
- Publication place: United Kingdom
- Pages: 272
- ISBN: 978-1-78478-366-2
- Dewey Decimal: 337

The City: London and the Global Power of Finance is a 2016 book by British economist and former trader Tony Norfield, published by Verso Books.

== Background and synopsis ==
The City is an insider's account of how the City, as London's financial centre is known, dominates international banking and foreign exchange and shapes global capital. Norfield spent twenty years as a senior trader in the financial district. He uses the inside knowledge to investigate the "role of the US dollar in global trading, the network of British-linked tax havens, the flows of finance around the world and the system of power built upon financial securities"

== Reception ==
In The Financial Times Brooke Masters wrote that the author "has done the research and pulled together the financial statistics that explain how the bloodsucking works" and describes the work as a "serious book". In the Morning Star Andrew Murray described The City as "fascinating" and "outstanding" and praised the in-depth research and analysis in the book.
