= List of Holywell Town F.C. seasons =

Listed below is the league history of Holywell Town (and the previous Holywell teams) in all the leagues that they have played in from the start of league football being played in Holywell starting in 1893 to the present day. Any season that is not mention within the list is where the league data cannot be found at this current time.

== 1893–1905 (As Holywell F.C.) ==
=== North Wales Coast League 1893–1898 ===
Holywell F.C. was one of the seven founders of the North Wales Coast League and played in the league from its inception until 1898.

Season	League	Position	Played	Won	Drawn	Lost	For	Against	Points	Notes
1893–94	North Wales Coast League	4th	12	5	0	7	27	27	10	
1894–95	North Wales Coast League	5th	8	2	1	5	8	33	5	
1895–96	North Wales Coast League	5th	10	3	1	6	15	31	7	
1896–97	North Wales Coast League	5th	10	2	1	7	17	28	5	
1897–98	North Wales Coast League	6th	7	2	1	4	9	21	5	

=== West Cheshire League 1898–1899 ===
Holywell F.C. would play only one season in the West Cheshire League, where other Flintshire teams were applying their trade, before returning to the North Wales Coast League the following season.

Season	League	Position	Played	Won	Drawn	Lost	For	Against	Points	Notes
1898–99	West Cheshire League Division 1	9th	19	6	1	12	29	62	13	

=== North Wales Coast League 1899–1901 ===
Holywell F.C. returned to the North Wales Coast League after a season's hiatus and played in the league for the two seasons over the turn of the century.

Season	League	Position	Played	Won	Drawn	Lost	For	Against	Points	Notes
1899–1900	North Wales Coast League	3rd	14	8	0	6	29	22	16	
1900–01	North Wales Coast League	5th	13	6	2	5	38	32	14	

=== Chester & District League 1901-1902 ===
Following their resignation from the North Wales Coast League, Holywell F.C. joined a number of other Flintshire-based clubs, such as Connah's Quay F.C. and Buckley Victoria, and competed in the local Chester and District League. They competed in Division One for just a season before withdrawing from the league.

Season	League	Position	Played	Won	Drawn	Lost	For	Against	Points	Notes
1901-02	Chester & District Division One	7th	14	3	2	9	18	56	8	

=== Flintshire League 1904-1906 ===
Holywell returned back to the local Welsh leagues and joined the Flintshire League in 1904.

Season	League	Position	Played	Won	Drawn	Lost	For	Against	Points	Notes
1904-05	Flintshire League Division One	7th	12	0	4	8	10	22	2	Two points deducted for playing an ineligible player
1905-06	Flintshire League Division Two	-	-	-	-	-	-	-	-	Data Missing

== 1906-1911 (As Holywell Victoria) ==
=== Flintshire League 1906-08 ===
Holywell changed its name to Holywell Victoria in 1906 as they initially competed in Division Two of the Flintshire League structure before the league became a one-division structure the following season.

Season	League	Position	Played	Won	Drawn	Lost	For	Against	Points	Notes
1906-07	Flintshire League Division Two	2nd	9	7	2	0	27	9	16	
1907-08	Flintshire League	6th	15	7	2	6	32	31	16	

=== Chester & District League 1908-11 ===
After three seasons in the Flintshire League, Holywell Victoria followed a number of other Flintshire clubs into the Chester and District League in 1908, repeating the example of Holywell FC earlier in the decade. The Vics joined the system in Division One and played in the league for three seasons.

Season	League	Position	Played	Won	Drawn	Lost	For	Against	Points	Notes
1908-09	Chester & District Division One	3rd	17	8	1	8	40	36	17	
1909-10	Chester & District Division One	6th	13	4	1	8	21	31	9	
1910-11	Chester & District Division One	4th	6	4	0	2	17	5	8	League data at 30 December 1910

== 1912–1930 (As Holywell United) ==
=== North Wales Coast League 1912–26 ===
Holywell United played in the North Wales Coast League pre and post World War I.

Season	League	Position	Played	Won	Drawn	Lost	For	Against	Points	Notes
1912–13	North Wales Coast League	7th	20	8	3	9	43	42	19	
1913–14	North Wales Coast League	1st	17	15	1	1	57	16	31	Won North Wales Coast Amateur Cup. Welsh Amateur Cup Finalists.
1914–18	No competition due to WWI									
1919–20	Data missing	n/a								
1920–21	North Wales Coast League	2nd	22	15	3	4	92	37	33	
1921–26	Data missing	n/a								
1926–27	Data missing	n/a	–	–	–	–	–	–	–	Welsh Cup Semi-Finalists

== 1930–1939 (As Holywell Arcadians) ==
=== Welsh Football League 1930–33 ===
Holywell Arcadians played in the Welsh Football League for three seasons from 1930 to 1933.

Season	League	Position	Played	Won	Drawn	Lost	For	Against	Points	Notes
1930–31	Welsh Football League	1st	26	20	4	2	125	46	44	
1931–32	Welsh Football League	2nd	24	18	1	5	124	43	37	
1932–33	Welsh Football League	1st	20	15	4	1	84	34	34	

== 1945–1970 ==
=== West Cheshire League 1947–49 ===
After the Second World War, Holywell Town would play two seasons in the West Cheshire League alongside fellow Flintshire side and rival Flint Town United before moving back to the Welsh leagues.

Season	League	Position	Played	Won	Drawn	Lost	For	Against	Points	Notes
1947–48	West Cheshire League Division 1	6th	22	9	5	8	74	57	23	
1948–49	West Cheshire League Division 1	6th	22	12	0	10	64	36	24	

=== Welsh League (North) 1949–66 ===
Holywell Town played in the Welsh League (North), which would later become the foundation for the Welsh Alliance League, from 1949 to 1966.

Holywell Town strip from 1955–56 season

Season	League	Position	Played	Won	Drawn	Lost	For	Against	Points	Notes
1949–50	Welsh League (North) Division 1	5th	30	15	7	8	97	64	37	
1950–51	Welsh League (North) Division 1	6th	30	15	3	12	70	52	33	
1951–52	Welsh League (North) Division 1	5th	32	16	5	11	82	54	37	
1952–53	Welsh League (North) Division 1	1st	34	24	6	4	119	56	54	
1953–54	Welsh League (North) Division 1	4th	34	21	7	6	91	38	49	Won Alves Cup
1954–55	Welsh League (North) Division 1	2nd	34	27	1	6	132	56	55	
1955–56	Welsh League (North) Division 1	7th	34	17	5	12	92	58	39	
1956–57	Welsh League (North) Division 1	5th	34	18	7	9	92	68	43	
1957–58	Welsh League (North) Division 1	3rd	32	23	2	7	136	42	48	Won NWC Amateur Cup
1958–59	Welsh League (North) Division 1	6th	34	17	5	12	100	99	39	
1959–60	Welsh League (North) Division 1	3rd	32	18	6	8	84	62	42	
1960–61	Welsh League (North) Division 1	6th	34	17	7	10	85	85	41	
1961–62	Welsh League (North)	14th	34	12	2	20	63	80	26	
1962–63	Welsh League (North)	10th	32	15	3	14	64	66	33	
1963–64	Welsh League (North)	5th	32	17	6	9	96	52	40	
1964–65	Welsh League (North)	14th	32	9	2	21	46	110	20	
1965–66	Welsh League (North)	15th	28	6	3	19	45	90	15	

== 1970–1990 ==
=== Welsh National League (Wrexham Area) 1970–1973 ===
At the start of the 1970s, Holywell Town would play in the Welsh National League (Wrexham Area) for three seasons, getting promoted on two consecutive seasons and reaching Division 2 in the Welsh National League structure.

Season	League	Position	Played	Won	Drawn	Lost	For	Against	Points	Notes
1970–71	Welsh National League Division 4	2nd	26	19	2	5	122	37	40	
1971–72	Welsh National League Division 3	2nd	30	24	3	3	123	39	51	
1972–73	Welsh National League Division 2	8th	30	15	3	12	94	76	33	

=== Clwyd League System 1975–1988 ===
Holywell played in the Clwyd League system from 1975 to 1988.

Season	League	Position	Played	Won	Drawn	Lost	For	Against	Points	Notes
1975–76	Welsh League (North) Division 5	1st	16	14	1	1	92	18	29	Promoted to Division 3 Won NWC Youth Cup
1976–77	Clwyd League Division 3	1st	30	26	4	0	138	28	56	Promoted to Division 1 Won NWC Junior Cup
1977–78	Clwyd League Division 1	4th	26	15	6	5	59	21	36	
1978–79	Clwyd League Division 1	11th	26	6	3	17	36	68	15	
1979–80	Clwyd League Division 1	8th	24	10	2	12	36	42	22	
1980–81	Clwyd League Division 1	2nd	24	14	5	5	63	26	33	
1981–82	Clwyd League Division 1	3rd	24	14	5	5	60	32	33	
1982–83	Clwyd League Division 1	14th	26	3	3	20	34	91	9	
1983–84	Clwyd League Premier Division	14th	28	4	1	23	29	77	9	
1984–85	Missing Data	n/a								
1985–86	Missing Data	n/a								
1986–87	Clwyd League Premier Division	1st	–	–	–	–	–	–	–	Won North Wales Coast Challenge Cup
1987–88	Clwyd League Premier Division	1st	–	–	–	–	–	–	–	Won Clwyd League Cup; Won President Cup

=== Welsh Alliance League 1988–90 ===
Welsh Alliance League

Season	League	Position	Played	Won	Drawn	Lost	For	Against	Points	Notes
1988–89	Welsh Alliance League	5th	32	16	8	13	65	64	51	
1989–90	Welsh Alliance League	14th	34	8	8	18	44	68	29*	*3pts deducted

== 1990–2015 ==
=== Cymru Alliance 1990–92 ===
Holywell became founding members of the new North Wales league, Cymru Alliance, and would stay in the league for the first two seasons, until they moved to the newly created national top tier League of Wales in 1992.

Season	League	Position	Played	Won	Drawn	Lost	For	Against	Points	Notes
1990–91	Cymru Alliance	9th	26	6	6	14	29	40	24	
1991–92	Cymru Alliance	11th	30	7	10	13	48	49	31	

=== League of Wales 1992–97 ===
Holywell became founding members of the new top-tier league of the Welsh football league system. They would stay in the League of Wales for five seasons until getting relegated in 1997.

Season	League	Position	Played	Won	Drawn	Lost	For	Against	Points	Notes
1992–93	League of Wales	6th	38	17	8	13	65	48	59	Won Clwyd League Auxiliary Cup; Won Clwyd League Youth Cup
1993–94	League of Wales	5th	38	18	10	10	74	57	64	
1994–95	League of Wales	8th	38	16	10	12	62	55	58	
1995–96	League of Wales	16th	40	12	7	21	53	74	43	
1996–97	League of Wales	20th	40	7	8	25	52	81	29	Relegated to Cymru Alliance

=== Cymru Alliance 1997–98 ===
Holywell dropped into the second tier of the Welsh football league system, and the first time in the Cymru Alliance since the 1991–92 season. They would stay for only one season, getting promoted back to the League of Wales as runners-up instead of league winners Rhydymwyn.

Season	League	Position	Played	Won	Drawn	Lost	For	Against	Points	Notes
1997–98	Cymru Alliance	2nd	36	25	6	5	86	34	81	Promoted to League of Wales; Won Cymru Alliance League Cup

=== League of Wales 1998–99 ===
Holywell stayed in the top-flight of the Welsh football league system for just one season before getting relegated once again to the Cymru Alliance. Currently, this is the last season Holywell were playing top-flight football in Wales.

Season	League	Position	Played	Won	Drawn	Lost	For	Against	Points	Notes
1998–99	League of Wales	17th	32	3	9	20	38	86	23	Relegated to Cymru Alliance

=== Cymru Alliance 1999–2006 ===
Holywell returned into the second tier of the Welsh football league system, after just one season in the League of Wales. They would stay in the Cymru Alliance for seven seasons until they were relegated in 2006.

Season	League	Position	Played	Won	Drawn	Lost	For	Against	Points	Notes
1999–00	Cymru Alliance	12th	32	7	4	21	41	69	25	
2000–01	Cymru Alliance	10th	32	11	6	15	47	69	39	
2001–02	Cymru Alliance	16th	34	8	5	21	50	85	29	
2002–03	Cymru Alliance	17th	32	4	5	23	33	96	8*	*9pts deducted
2003–04	Cymru Alliance	14th	32	8	8	16	38	61	32	
2004–05	Cymru Alliance	9th	34	13	7	14	77	64	46	
2005–06	Cymru Alliance	17th	34	5	12	17	49	72	24	Relegated to Welsh Alliance

=== Welsh Alliance League 2006–2015 ===
Holywell dropped into the third tier of the Welsh football league system, and the first time in the Welsh Alliance League since the 1989–90 season. In the 2010–11 season, the Welsh Alliance split into two divisions due to the reorganisation of the Welsh football league system. They would spend nine seasons in the Welsh third tier before getting promoted in the 2014–15 season.

Holywell Town strip from 2010 to 2012 season

Season	League	Position	Played	Won	Drawn	Lost	For	Against	Points	Notes
2006–07	Welsh Alliance League	10th	28	8	8	12	59	63	32	
2007–08	Welsh Alliance League	12th	28	8	6	14	44	70	27*	*3pts deducted
2008–09	Welsh Alliance League	14th	32	10	3	19	64	80	33	
2009–10	Welsh Alliance League	10th	30	13	7	10	72	43	46	
2010–11	Welsh Alliance League Division 1	3rd	30	17	3	10	68	40	54	Won FAW Trophy; Won Clwyd Reserve Division
2011–12	Welsh Alliance League Division 1	2nd	30	23	3	4	77	29	72	Mawddach Barritt Trophy Finalists
2012–13	Welsh Alliance League Division 1	3rd	28	18	7	3	98	38	61	Cookson Cup Finalists
2013–14	Welsh Alliance League Division 1	2nd	28	20	5	3	103	23	65	Welsh Cup Semi-Finalists; Cookson Cup Winners
2014–15	Welsh Alliance League Division 1	1st	26	23	2	1	119	19	71	League champions FAW Trophy Winners; Mawddach Challenge Cup Winners; Cookson Cup Finalists

== 2015 – Present ==
=== Cymru Alliance 2015–2019 ===
After nine seasons away, Holywell Town returned to the second tier for the start of the 2015–16 season. After finishing in fifth position for three consecutive seasons, they were eventually relegated back to the third tier on the final day of the 2018–19 season after finishing fourteenth in the sixteen team league. The Wellmen competed in the Cymru Alliance for four seasons before going into the Welsh National League (Wrexham Area) Premier Division.

Season	League	Position	Played	Won	Drawn	Lost	For	Against	Points	Notes
2015–16	Cymru Alliance	5th	30	15	7	8	55	34	52	NE Wales FA Cup Finalists
2016–17	Cymru Alliance	5th	30	14	8	8	52	45	50	
2017–18	Cymru Alliance	5th	28	14	8	6	75	37	50	NEWFA Cup Finalists
2018–19	Cymru Alliance	14th	30	8	6	16	38	58	30	Relegated to the Welsh National League (Wrexham Area) Premier Division

=== Welsh National League (Wrexham Area) 2019–2020 ===
The 2019–20 season saw Holywell Town compete in the Welsh National League (Wrexham Area) football system for the first time after being relegated from the second tier at the end of the 2018–19 season. Due to their location within north-east Wales, the Flintshire-based side was placed in the WNL pyramid, whose governance area covers clubs from Flintshire, Wrexham and eastern Denbighshire.

In the middle of the 2019–20 season, the Football Association of Wales Board decided that all leagues between tier 1 - 4 would be curtailed due to the COVID-19 pandemic. Promotion and relegation was decided on an unweighted points per game basis. This resulted in Holywell Town winning the league with 2.47 points per game.

Season	League	Position	Played	Won	Drawn	Lost	For	Against	Points	Notes
2019–20	Welsh National League Premier Division	1st	17	13	3	1	62	8	42	2.47 points per game ratio

=== Cymru North 2020- ===
Holywell Town returned back to the second tier of the Welsh football pyramid after a season's hiatus, playing in the Cymru North, the replacement for the Cymru Alliance following the reorganisation of the tier two leagues in the 2019-20 season. The Wellmen were scheduled to compete in the 2020-21 season, but due to the COVID-19 pandemic, all football below the Cymru Premier level was voided for the season. Therefore, Holywell's first season playing in the Cymru North was the 2021-22 season when football resumed in the Welsh football pyramid.

Season	League	Position	Played	Won	Drawn	Lost	For	Against	GD	Points	Notes
2020-21	Cymru North	n/a	-	-	-	-	-	-	-	-	Season Cancelled
2021-22	Cymru North	4th	28	15	5	8	68	36	+32	50	
2022-23	Cymru North	2nd	30	26	1	3	75	22	+53	79	
2023-24	Cymru North	1st	30	26	3	1	79	17	+62	81	Failed to obtain Tier 1 licence
2024-25	Cymru North	3rd	30	18	3	9	56	41	+15	57	
2025-26	Cymru North	3rd	30	18	6	6	78	40	+38	60	

Current league position as of 5th September 2026
