= 1998–99 Cymru Alliance =

Cymru Alliance
- Season: 1998–99
- Champions: Flexsys Cefn Druids

The 1998–99 Cymru Alliance was the ninth season of the Cymru Alliance after its establishment in 1990. The league was won by Flexsys Cefn Druids.

== League table ==
Pos	Team	Pld	W	D	L	GF	GA	GD	Pts	Promotion or relegation
1	Flexsys Cefn Druids (C, P)	30	22	3	5	105	36	+69	69	Promotion to League of Wales
2	Rhydymwyn	30	17	6	7	66	36	+30	57	
3	Flint Town United	30	14	6	10	60	44	+16	48	
4	Oswestry Town	30	15	3	12	67	53	+14	48	
5	Glantraeth	30	13	7	10	57	47	+10	46	
6	Cemaes Bay	30	12	9	9	53	48	+5	45	
7	CPD Porthmadog	30	12	7	11	52	49	+3	43	
8	Welshpool Town	30	11	9	10	47	39	+8	42	
9	Llandudno	30	11	7	12	49	48	+1	40	
10	Lex XI	30	11	7	12	48	62	−14	40	
11	Holyhead Hotspur	30	11	6	13	49	62	−13	39	
12	Denbigh Town	30	11	4	15	52	65	−13	37	
13	Ruthin Town	30	7	15	8	36	37	−1	36	
14	Buckley Town	30	9	6	15	48	75	−27	33	
15	Brymbo Broughton	30	8	7	15	28	43	−15	31	
16	Mostyn	30	1	8	21	26	99	−73	11	Folded after season

Source: Cymru Alliance
Rules for classification: 1) points; 2) goal difference; 3) number of goals scored.
(C) Champions; (P) Promoted
