= 1996–97 Cymru Alliance =

Cymru Alliance
- Season: 1996–97
- Champions: Rhayader Town
- Relegated: Rhos Aelwyd; Carno

The 1996–97 Cymru Alliance was the seventh season of the Cymru Alliance after its establishment in 1990. The league was won by Rhayader Town.

== League table ==
Pos	Team	Pld	W	D	L	GF	GA	GD	Pts	Promotion or relegation
1	Rhayader Town (C, P)	34	21	12	1	79	25	+54	75	Promotion to League of Wales
2	Rhydymwyn	34	20	8	6	75	48	+27	68	
3	Llandudno	34	19	9	6	84	31	+53	66	
4	Oswestry Town	34	19	9	6	79	31	+48	66	
5	Cefn Druids	34	19	8	7	74	50	+24	65	
6	Knighton Town	34	19	6	9	68	46	+22	63	
7	Llandrindod Wells	34	16	7	11	67	44	+23	55	
8	Penrhyncoch	34	15	9	10	71	56	+15	54	
9	Brymbo Broughton	34	10	14	10	47	48	−1	44	
10	Lex XI	34	12	4	18	54	72	−18	40	
11	Denbigh Town	34	11	5	18	60	70	−10	38	
12	Mold Alexandra (Note: Mold Alexandra deducted 3 points)	34	12	5	17	51	64	−13	38	
13	Buckley Town	34	10	5	19	39	64	−25	35	
14	Llanidloes Town	34	9	7	18	36	77	−41	34	
15	Mostyn Town	34	8	9	17	46	67	−21	33	
16	Penycae	34	9	3	22	40	99	−59	30	
17	Ruthin Town	34	7	3	24	39	68	−29	24	
18	Rhos Aelwyd (R)	34	7	3	24	42	91	−49	24	Relegation to Welsh Level 3
19	Carno (R)	36	6	3	27	42	89	−47	21	Relegation to Welsh Level 3

Source: Cymru Alliance
Rules for classification: 1) points; 2) goal difference; 3) number of goals scored.
(C) Champions; (P) Promoted; (R) Relegated
