= 2001–02 Cymru Alliance =

Cymru Alliance
- Season: 2001–02
- Champions: Welshpool Town
- Relegated: Denbigh Town; Brymbo Broughton

The 2001–02 Cymru Alliance was the twelfth season of the Cymru Alliance after its establishment in 1990. The league was won by Welshpool Town.

== League table ==
Pos	Team	Pld	W	D	L	GF	GA	GD	Pts	Promotion or relegation
1	Welshpool Town (C, P)	34	25	5	4	101	29	+72	80	Promotion to Welsh Premier League
2	Llangefni Glantraeth	34	24	3	7	76	36	+40	75	
3	Cemaes Bay	34	23	4	7	81	45	+36	73	
4	CPD Porthmadog	34	20	8	6	88	45	+43	68	
5	Buckley Town	34	21	4	9	72	38	+34	67	
6	Ruthin Town	34	17	7	10	78	53	+25	58	
7	Halkyn United	34	17	7	10	58	43	+15	58	
8	Airbus UK	34	16	6	12	55	55	0	54	
9	Holyhead Hotspur	34	15	4	15	72	78	−6	49	
10	Llandudno	34	12	3	19	55	80	−25	39	
11	Gresford Athletic	34	10	7	17	47	59	−12	37	
12	Llanfairpwll	34	10	6	18	59	81	−22	36	
13	Flint Town United	34	8	7	19	40	58	−18	31	
14	Lex XI (Note: Lex XI deducted 12 points)	34	13	4	17	67	87	−20	31	
15	Guilsfield	34	8	6	20	49	82	−33	30	
16	Holywell Town	34	8	5	21	50	85	−35	29	
17	Brymbo Broughton (R)	34	6	5	23	40	80	−40	23	Relegation to WNL Premier Division
18	Denbigh Town (Note: Denbigh Town deducted 3 points) (R)	34	5	5	24	29	83	−54	17	Relegation to WNL Premier Division

Source: Cymru Alliance
Rules for classification: 1) points; 2) goal difference; 3) number of goals scored.
(C) Champions; (P) Promoted; (R) Relegated
