= 1999–2000 Cymru Alliance =

Cymru Alliance
- Season: 1999–2000
- Champions: Oswestry Town
- Relegated: Corwen Amateurs

The 1999–2000 Cymru Alliance was the tenth season of the Cymru Alliance after its establishment in 1990. The league was won by Oswestry Town.

== League table ==
Pos	Team	Pld	W	D	L	GF	GA	GD	Pts	Promotion or relegation
1	Oswestry Town (C, P)	32	21	4	7	64	43	+21	67	Promotion to League of Wales
2	Glantraeth	32	18	7	7	82	39	+43	61	
3	Cemaes Bay	32	17	8	7	74	44	+30	59	
4	Welshpool Town	32	17	6	9	60	41	+19	57	
5	CPD Porthmadog	32	17	5	10	64	40	+24	56	
6	Flint Town United	32	16	8	8	65	43	+22	56	
7	Llandudno	32	16	5	11	70	57	+13	53	
8	Rhydymwyn	32	15	5	12	55	54	+1	50	
9	Llangefni Town	32	13	10	9	60	43	+17	49	
10	Buckley Town	32	13	8	11	53	44	+9	47	
11	Ruthin Town	32	13	7	12	55	45	+10	46	
12	Holyhead Hotspur	32	9	6	17	52	70	−18	33	
13	Lex XI	32	9	3	20	55	90	−35	30	
14	Brymbo	32	7	8	17	32	51	−19	29	
15	Denbigh Town (Note: Denbigh Town deducted 3 points)	32	8	5	19	36	79	−43	26	
16	Holywell Town	32	7	4	21	41	69	−28	25	
17	Corwen Amateurs (R)	32	5	3	24	25	91	−66	18	Relegation to WNL Premier Division

Source: Cymru Alliance
Rules for classification: 1) points; 2) goal difference; 3) number of goals scored.
(C) Champions; (P) Promoted; (R) Relegated
