= 1994–95 Cymru Alliance =

Cymru Alliance
- Season: 1994–95
- Champions: Cemaes Bay

The 1994–95 Cymru Alliance was the fifth season of the Cymru Alliance after its establishment in 1990. The league was won by Cemaes Bay.

== League table ==
Pos	Team	Pld	W	D	L	GF	GA	GD	Pts	Promotion
1	Cemaes Bay (C, P)	34	29	3	2	117	24	+93	90	Promotion to League of Wales
2	Brymbo	34	26	2	6	81	35	+46	80	
3	Wrexham Reserves	34	24	5	5	101	39	+62	77	
4	Llandudno	34	23	5	6	88	32	+56	74	
5	Cefn Druids	34	19	3	12	73	51	+22	60	
6	Carno	34	18	4	12	63	61	+2	58	
7	Llandrindod Wells	34	12	11	11	71	60	+11	47	
8	Lex XI	34	13	8	13	47	58	−11	47	
9	Welshpool Town	34	13	7	14	57	61	−4	46	
10	Ruthin Town	34	10	9	15	41	51	−10	39	
11	Rhayader Town	34	11	6	17	48	66	−18	39	
12	Penycae	34	11	6	17	47	74	−27	39	
13	Knighton Town	34	10	6	18	37	71	−34	36	
14	Rhos Aelwyd	34	9	7	18	45	72	−27	34	
15	Llanidloes Town	34	6	6	22	41	86	−45	24	
16	Buckley Town	34	6	5	23	41	80	−39	23	
17	Mostyn Town (Note: Mostyn Town deducted 3 points)	34	3	4	27	46	111	−65	10	
18	Penrhyncoch (Note: Penrhyncoch deducted 39 points)	34	12	5	17	53	65	−12	2	

Source: Cymru Alliance
Rules for classification: 1) points; 2) goal difference; 3) number of goals scored.
(C) Champions; (P) Promoted
