= 2000–01 Cymru Alliance =

Cymru Alliance
- Season: 2000–01
- Champions: Caernarfon Town

The 2000–01 Cymru Alliance was the eleventh season of the Cymru Alliance after its establishment in 1990. The league was won by Caernarfon Town.

== League table ==
Pos	Team	Pld	W	D	L	GF	GA	GD	Pts	Promotion
1	Caernarfon Town (C, P)	32	24	4	4	105	29	+76	76	Promotion to League of Wales
2	Llangefni Town	30	20	5	5	67	34	+33	65	
3	Welshpool Town	32	19	7	6	86	35	+51	64	
4	Cemaes Bay	32	17	9	6	64	38	+26	60	
5	Buckley Town	31	17	7	7	66	29	+37	58	
6	CPD Porthmadog	31	16	6	9	62	37	+25	54	
7	Llandudno	32	14	6	12	46	52	−6	48	
8	Lex XI	31	12	4	15	68	84	−16	40	
9	Halkyn United	30	11	6	13	47	55	−8	39	
10	Holywell Town	32	11	6	15	47	69	−22	39	
11	Airbus UK	31	10	7	14	54	63	−9	37	
12	Ruthin Town	32	10	7	15	48	60	−12	37	
13	Holyhead Hotspur	31	10	6	15	59	76	−17	36	
14	Glantraeth	24	7	5	12	40	60	−20	26	
15	Denbigh Town	32	5	5	22	32	84	−52	20	
16	Brymbo Broughton	30	5	4	21	34	78	−44	19	
17	Flint Town United (Note: Flint Town United deducted 9 points)	32	6	4	22	43	85	−42	13	

Source: Cymru Alliance
Rules for classification: 1) points; 2) goal difference; 3) number of goals scored.
(C) Champions; (P) Promoted
