= Mostyn F.C. =

Football club based in Flintshire

Mostyn
- Full name: Mostyn Football Club
- Ground: Maes Pennant
- League: North East Wales Division Three
- 1998-99: Cymru Alliance 16th of 16

Mostyn Football Club is a Welsh football club based in Mostyn, Flintshire who play in the North East Wales Division Three. They played in the second-tier Cymru Alliance from the league's founding in 1990, until the club folded in 1999.

The club played at Maes Pennant throughout its history.

The village was later represented by Mostyn Dragons from 2007 to 2018. A new Mostyn club is expected to join the North East Wales Football League Division Three for the 2026–27 season. The team will be made up mostly of players from Greenfield reserves.

== History ==
=== Earlier clubs ===
A football club was formed in Mostyn in 1910, known as Mostyn Temperance. This club continued its existence until at least November 1911. The club was later described as having "won many laurels".

The village was later represented by Mostyn YMCA. In the 1936–37 season they won the Dyserth Area League, and two of their players signed amateur contracts for Bolton Wanderers. In 1938 another Mostyn side, T.P.'s, joined the Dyserth League, with many former members of the YMCA club. They used a pitch at Green Park.

By 1949, there were three clubs in Mostyn - Mostyn YMCA, Mostyn Church Guild, and Mostyn Aelwyd Club.

In December 1963, Mostyn YMCA were faced with losing their Maes Pennant ground. However, the development previously stated to be "immediate" was pushed back until spring of 1964 by Holywell Rural Council's Housing Committee. The YMCA club were also looking to buy land for a ground of their own.

Mostyn YMCA also won the NWCFA Junior Cup six times; as of 2023 this is the second most of any club, only beaten by Menai Bridge Tigers' eight titles. In 1971–72 they beat Denbigh Town 2–1 to lift the North Wales Coast Amateur Cup for the only time in their history.

=== Mostyn Football Club ===
Mostyn Football Club was claimed to have a history dating to 1912. This appears to refer to the various earlier clubs.

Mostyn played at Glan y Don for part of the 1986–87 season after the discovery of two mineshafts near Maes Pennant midway through the season. They finished second bottom of the Clwyd League Premier Division that season. The council had filled the shafts in by June 1987 and they were able to return to Maes Pennant for the new season. In 1988–89, Mostyn won the Clwyd League title and the NWCFA Challenge Cup. A year later they were runners-up in the league to Connah's Quay Nomads reserves.

The Cymru Alliance was established in 1990 and Mostyn moved up two divisions to become founding members of the league. In November 1990, Mostyn manager Lennie Dunster was sacked, which he apparently only learned from a message left with his wife. In the 1990–91 season the team won 4–1 against Afan Lido to advance to the Welsh Intermediate Cup semi-finals for the first time in the club's history. By this point they were the only North Wales side left in the competition. In the semi-final they were set to play Porthcawl Town at Caersws. The match was abandoned after 52 minutes due to a "massive downpour", with Mostyn leading 1–0. Mostyn's secretary, Brynmor Hughes, was angry the match had gone ahead at all, as he claimed he knew the pitch would be unfit to play in the heavy rain. The match was replayed at Welshpool a week later. Mostyn gave up a 2–0 lead, but an 83rd-minute winner confirmed a 3–2 win, enough to advance to the final. In the final at Llanidloes, Mostyn lost 2–0 to Abergavenny Thursdays and were fined £100 in addition to losing out on their £500 prize money due to crowd trouble in the match. Club secretary Brynmor Hughes said he felt the club had been "harshly treated" and appealed the decision.

In 1995 the club was relegated and they were set to play in the Welsh Alliance League for the new season. Mostyn were bottom from most of the 1994–95 season, but Penrhyncoch received a 39-point deduction for use of an ineligible player, which put them bottom instead. As Wrexham reserves left the league, a vote was held between the league's clubs to decide which club would be relegated. It ended 9–6 in favour of keeping Penrhyncoch in the league, and relegating Mostyn. A week later it was reported that Mostyn were set to appeal to the Football Association of Wales against relegation, The appeal was successful, and the club was reinstated in the Cymru Alliance. This move also caused Llanrwst United to be demoted back to the Gwynedd League from the Welsh Alliance, and Penmaenmawr Phoenix were forced to return to the Gwynedd League from the Clwyd League, despite both having already played a match in their new league. After finishing bottom of the Cymru Alliance in 1998–99, Mostyn folded due to a combination of player shortages and issues with vandalism at their Maes Pennant ground.

In May 2026 it was confirmed the club would return to senior football with a team entering to the North East Wales Football League for the 2026–27 season.
