= 1997–98 League of Wales =

League of Wales
- Season: 1997–98
- Champions: Barry Town
- Relegated: Porthmadog; Flint Town United; Welshpool Town; Cemaes Ynys Môn
- Champions League: Barry Town
- UEFA Cup: Newtown
- Cup Winners' Cup: Bangor City
- Intertoto Cup: Ebbw Vale
- Matches played: 380
- Goals scored: 1,334 (3.51 per match)
- Top goalscorer: Eifion Williams (40)

The 1997–98 League of Wales was the sixth season of the League of Wales since its establishment in 1992. The league was won for the third consecutive year by Barry Town, who accrued a total of 104 points – one less than the previous season – scoring 134 goals in the process (an average of 3.53 goals per game).

== League table ==
Pos	Team	Pld	W	D	L	GF	GA	GD	Pts	Qualification or relegation
1	Barry Town (C)	38	33	5	0	134	31	+103	104	Qualification for Champions League first qualifying round
2	Newtown	38	23	9	6	101	47	+54	78	Qualification for UEFA Cup first qualifying round
3	Ebbw Vale	38	22	11	5	94	55	+39	77	Qualification for Intertoto Cup first round
4	Inter CableTel	38	23	5	10	58	28	+30	74	
5	Cwmbran Town	38	22	7	9	78	47	+31	73	
6	Bangor City	38	20	8	10	72	54	+18	68	Qualification for Cup Winners' Cup qualifying round
7	Connah's Quay Nomads	38	18	12	8	75	54	+21	66	
8	Rhyl	38	17	10	11	61	49	+12	61	
9	Conwy United	38	15	8	15	66	59	+7	53	
10	Aberystwyth Town	38	13	12	13	64	63	+1	51	
11	Caersws	38	14	4	20	64	71	−7	46	
12	Carmarthen Town	38	11	11	16	57	72	−15	44	
13	Caernarfon Town	38	12	7	19	57	66	−9	43	
14	Total Network Solutions	38	9	15	14	54	67	−13	42	
15	Rhayader Town	38	11	6	21	55	78	−23	39	
16	Haverfordwest County	38	10	8	20	54	87	−33	38	
17	Porthmadog (R)	38	10	5	23	55	77	−22	35	Relegation to Cymru Alliance
18	Flint Town United (R)	38	9	7	22	50	77	−27	34	Relegation to Cymru Alliance
19	Welshpool Town (R)	38	6	7	25	55	97	−42	25	Relegation to Cymru Alliance
20	Cemaes Ynys Môn (R)	38	2	3	33	30	155	−125	9	Relegation to Cymru Alliance

Rules for classification: 1) points; 2) goal difference; 3) number of goals scored.
(C) Champions; (R) Relegated

== Results ==
Home \ Away	ABE	BAN	BAR	CAE	CWS	CMR	CEM	CQN	CON	CWM	EBB	FTU	HAV	INC	NTW	POR	RHA	RHY	TNS	WEL
Aberystwyth Town		3–1	0–2	3–0	1–0	3–1	2–5	0–1	3–0	2–4	1–1	2–1	4–0	1–0	0–1	2–2	3–1	1–1	2–2	5–0
Bangor City	1–0		1–4	1–0	3–2	2–2	6–0	0–2	1–1	2–2	1–0	2–1	1–2	2–1	0–3	3–3	3–1	2–0	2–0	5–1
Barry Town	6–1	5–0		4–0	6–1	6–3	12–0	2–1	3–1	2–1	1–1	2–0	3–2	2–1	5–5	3–0	2–0	3–2	10–0	8–0
Caernarfon Town	1–1	1–1	2–5		0–1	5–0	4–0	0–1	1–1	1–4	2–3	0–0	3–1	1–3	1–5	2–2	4–1	1–1	3–1	3–0
Caersws	5–3	1–3	0–2	4–2		6–1	3–0	0–2	1–4	2–1	1–2	2–3	3–1	2–0	1–2	4–1	0–1	1–2	2–0	3–0
Carmarthen Town	1–1	0–3	3–5	0–2	0–0		4–0	2–2	0–1	1–2	2–2	3–0	0–1	2–0	2–2	3–1	1–0	2–2	1–3	1–1
Cemaes Ynys Môn	2–2	0–3	0–3	0–5	2–4	3–3		1–4	1–2	2–5	0–2	1–2	4–0	0–3	0–1	1–2	1–3	0–2	1–5	2–3
Connah's Quay Nomads	1–0	2–2	1–4	2–0	3–1	0–2	10–0		2–2	1–5	2–3	3–2	5–2	0–0	1–1	2–2	2–1	1–1	2–2	2–1
Conwy United	1–3	0–2	1–3	0–2	3–0	0–2	4–0	2–2		1–2	2–3	2–0	2–0	1–2	3–1	1–0	4–1	2–1	2–2	0–0
Cwmbran Town	1–1	0–1	0–3	1–2	3–1	1–1	2–0	2–2	2–1		1–2	4–3	6–0	0–0	3–1	3–1	3–0	2–0	2–1	3–2
Ebbw Vale	1–1	2–3	1–1	1–1	3–3	3–1	10–1	2–0	4–3	2–1		5–0	6–1	4–0	0–4	2–1	1–1	3–3	2–1	1–1
Flint Town United	1–1	1–4	1–2	0–2	2–0	1–2	3–0	1–2	1–6	1–1	0–4		1–1	1–2	2–3	3–1	0–2	3–3	1–1	1–1
Haverfordwest County	1–1	2–2	0–1	3–0	1–2	1–1	5–0	2–1	1–1	2–1	1–4	1–3		0–2	1–6	3–0	2–4	0–1	2–2	3–0
Inter CableTel	3–0	2–0	0–0	3–1	1–0	3–0	1–0	4–1	3–0	0–1	2–0	1–3	3–0		0–1	2–1	1–0	2–0	2–1	3–1
Newtown	4–0	4–2	0–2	2–1	1–1	2–0	11–1	1–1	3–3	1–2	1–2	3–2	5–2	0–0		4–0	3–1	1–1	1–1	3–0
Porthmadog	5–3	0–1	0–3	2–0	3–2	0–1	7–0	1–3	3–0	0–1	0–2	0–1	2–3	0–4	1–4		1–2	0–2	3–1	3–1
Rhayader Town	1–3	2–1	2–2	1–2	2–4	2–1	5–0	1–3	1–3	1–2	2–2	1–3	3–1	1–0	0–4	1–3		0–3	1–1	3–2
Rhyl	2–2	2–1	0–1	2–1	2–0	3–0	3–1	0–1	0–3	1–0	5–2	2–0	0–2	0–1	3–2	1–1	2–0		2–1	3–2
Total Network Solutions	1–0	1–1	0–1	2–0	1–1	2–3	1–1	0–0	2–1	3–3	2–3	1–0	2–2	1–1	2–4	2–1	2–2	1–0		3–1
Welshpool Town	1–3	1–3	0–5	4–1	4–0	1–5	8–0	2–4	1–2	0–1	2–3	4–2	2–2	0–2	0–1	1–2	3–3	3–3	1–0	

Legend: Blue = home team win; Yellow = draw; Red = away team win.
