= 2010–11 Cymru Alliance =

Huws Gray Alliance
- Season: 2010–11
- Champions: Gap Connah's Quay
- Relegated: Rhayader Town; Rhydymwyn; Technogroup Welshpool Town
- Matches: 240
- Goals: 866 (3.61 per match)
- Top goalscorer: 31 – Gary O'Toole (Gap Connah's Quay)
- Biggest home win: Gap Connah's Quay 6–0 Technogroup Welshpool Town; 14 August 2010; Gap Connah's Quay 7–1 Rhos Aelwyd; 10 December 2010
- Biggest away win: Rhydymwyn 0–6 Langefni Town; 30 October 2010
- Highest scoring: Technogroup Welshpool Town 3–8 Langefni Town; 13 November 2010
- Highest attendance: 452 – Cefn Druids 5–1 Gap Connah's Quay; 22 October 2010
- Lowest attendance: 32 – Ruthin Town 3–3 Penrhyncoch; 15 January 2011
- Average attendance: 134

The 2010–11 Huws Gray Alliance season began on 13 August 2010 and was originally scheduled to end on 2 April 2011. Due to adverse weather conditions, no league games took place between 12 December and the beginning of January, causing many fixtures to be rearranged and creating the possibility of the season being extended. The season was eventually extended to 3 May 2011.

== Teams ==
Location of clubs in Cymru Alliance 2010–11

== League table ==
Pos	Team	Pld	W	D	L	GF	GA	GD	Pts	Relegation
1	Connah's Quay Nomads (C)	30	23	2	5	89	33	+56	71	
2	Rhyl	30	19	5	6	73	32	+41	62	
3	Cefn Druids	30	18	6	6	60	29	+31	60	
4	Rhos Aelwyd	30	15	6	9	68	64	+4	51	
5	Caersws	30	15	5	10	59	49	+10	50	
6	Llandudno	30	13	10	7	50	35	+15	49	
7	Flint Town United	30	13	7	10	64	55	+9	46	
8	Porthmadog	30	14	4	12	59	54	+5	46	
9	Buckley Town	30	13	6	11	46	48	−2	45	
10	Llangefni Town	30	11	4	15	67	64	+3	37	
11	Penrhyncoch	30	9	10	11	49	56	−7	37	
12	Ruthin Town	30	11	4	15	39	58	−19	37	
13	Guilsfield	30	8	6	16	43	56	−13	30	
14	Rhydymwyn (R)	30	4	6	20	27	82	−55	18	Relegation to Welsh Level 3
15	Rhayader Town (R)	30	4	3	23	34	76	−42	15	Relegation to Welsh Level 3
16	Technogroup Welshpool Town (Note: Technogroup Welshpool Town deducted 15 points for fielding ineligible players and a further three points for failing to fulfil a fixture) (R)	30	5	6	19	39	76	−37	3	Relegation to Welsh Level 3

Source: Huws Gray Alliance
Rules for classification: 1) points; 2) goal difference; 3) number of goals scored.
(C) Champions; (R) Relegated

== Results ==
Home \ Away	BUC	CSW	CDR	FTU	CQN	GUI	LND	LGT	PRC	POR	RHA	RHO	RHY	RHL	RUT	WEL
Buckley Town		0–2	2–1	3–0	1–3	2–2	0–1	1–4	2–3	2–0	2–0	2–3	1–0	2–2	3–2	2–1
Caersws	1–1		1–1	6–3	1–2	1–1	2–2	4–2	3–0	5–2	4–0	3–2	2–0	2–1	4–2	2–0
Cefn Druids	0–1	2–0		1–1	5–1	2–1	1–1	3–1	4–2	2–1	4–0	4–1	1–0	2–2	2–0	2–1
Flint Town United	4–1	5–1	1–0		1–2	2–1	2–3	4–3	3–2	3–3	5–1	2–2	1–1	1–1	0–1	2–0
Connah's Quay Nomads	4–1	6–2	0–0	4–2		2–1	2–1	3–4	3–0	1–2	1–0	7–1	5–0	2–3	5–0	6–0
Guilsfield	2–3	0–2	0–3	2–3	1–2		1–1	0–2	0–1	0–2	2–1	4–4	2–0	0–2	0–3	2–1
Llandudno	0–0	3–0	0–1	1–0	0–0	0–3		1–4	1–1	5–0	2–0	3–0	3–0	2–1	6–1	4–1
Llangefni Town	3–1	4–2	0–2	0–2	1–5	2–3	1–1		0–2	0–1	1–1	1–3	5–3	2–4	0–1	3–0
Penrhyncoch	1–1	0–2	2–1	3–1	1–2	2–4	1–1	3–1		1–1	4–1	2–2	2–2	1–0	2–2	0–0
Porthmadog	2–4	0–1	0–0	2–1	1–3	5–0	2–3	4–1	1–1		4–2	2–1	4–0	0–3	0–1	0–2
Rhayader Town	0–2	3–0	3–4	1–1	1–3	2–1	0–2	0–4	3–2	3–5		2–5	1–1	1–2	4–0	2–3
Rhos Aelwyd	2–0	1–0	1–2	2–1	0–4	1–1	2–2	2–2	5–3	2–5	2–0		2–1	2–5	2–1	5–1
Rhydymwyn	1–1	1–3	0–4	3–5	0–4	1–1	1–1	0–6	4–2	0–3	2–1	1–6		1–4	2–1	2–0
Rhyl	1–2	1–0	3–1	1–2	1–0	4–0	2–0	2–2	2–0	1–0	4–0	2–4	5–0		3–0	1–1
Ruthin Town	3–1	2–1	2–1	0–2	0–4	0–4	3–0	3–0	3–3	1–2	2–1	0–1	3–0	1–4		0–0
Technogroup Welshpool Town	0–2	2–2	1–4	4–4	2–3	0–4	3–0	3–8	1–2	4–5	2–0	1–2	3–0	1–6	1–1	

Source: Huws Gray Alliance
Legend: Blue = home team win; Yellow = draw; Red = away team win.
