= 2014–15 Cymru Alliance =

Cymru Alliance
- Season: 2014–15
- Teams: 16

The 2014–15 Cymru Alliance (known as the Huws Gray Alliance for sponsorship reasons) is a football league in Wales. It is the top division of football in North & Central Wales and the second tier of the Welsh football league system.

The reigning champions are Cefn Druids. They were promoted to the Welsh Premier League.

== Promotion and relegation ==
Teams promoted from 2013–14 feeder leagues

- Denbigh Town – Welsh Alliance League champions
- Llandrindod Wells – Mid Wales League champions
- Mold Alexandra – Welsh National League (Wrexham Area) champions

Teams relegated from 2013–14 Welsh Premier League

- None

== Stadia and locations ==
Location of teams in the 2014–15 Cymru Alliance

Club	Location	Ground
Buckley Town	Buckley	Globe Way Stadium
Caernarfon Town	Caernarfon	The Oval
Caersws	Caersws	Recreation Ground
Conwy Borough	Conwy	Y Morfa
Denbigh Town	Denbigh	Central Park
Flint Town United	Flint	Cae-y-Castell
Guilsfield	Guilsfield	Guilsfield Community Centre
Holyhead Hotspur	Holyhead	The New Oval
Llandrindod Wells	Llandrindod Wells	The Broadway
Llandudno	Llandudno	Maesdu Park
Llanidloes Town	Llanidloes	Victoria Park
Mold Alexandra	Mold	Alyn Park
Penycae	Penycae	Afoneitha Road
Porthmadog	Porthmadog	Y Traeth
Rhayader Town	Rhayader	The Weirglodd
Rhydymwyn	Rhydymwyn	Dolfechlas Road

== League table ==
Pos	Team	Pld	W	D	L	GF	GA	GD	Pts	Promotion or relegation
1	Llandudno (C, P)	30	22	5	3	96	27	+69	71	Promotion to Welsh Premier League
2	Caernarfon Town	30	20	6	4	82	25	+57	66	
3	Guilsfield	30	19	6	5	68	33	+35	63	
4	Buckley Town	30	15	7	8	69	47	+22	52	
5	Holyhead Hotspur	30	15	6	9	49	38	+11	51	
6	Porthmadog	30	15	5	10	63	35	+28	50	
7	Denbigh Town	30	14	6	10	54	51	+3	48	
8	Caersws	30	13	8	9	61	47	+14	47	
9	Mold Alexandra	30	13	5	12	58	48	+10	44	
10	Flint Town United	30	13	5	12	39	45	−6	44	
11	Conwy Borough	30	12	5	13	52	46	+6	41	
12	Rhayader Town	30	8	6	16	42	53	−11	30	
13	Llanidloes Town (R)	30	8	5	17	55	78	−23	29	Relegation to Welsh Level 3
14	Penycae (R)	30	6	4	20	46	78	−32	22	Relegation to Welsh Level 3
15	Llandrindod Wells (R)	30	5	3	22	32	103	−71	18	Relegation to Welsh Level 3
16	Rhydymwyn (R)	30	1	0	29	21	132	−111	3	Relegation to Welsh Level 3

Rules for classification: 1) points; 2) goal difference; 3) number of goals scored.
(C) Champions; (P) Promoted; (R) Relegated
