= 2008–09 Cymru Alliance =

Cymru Alliance
- Season: 2008–09
- Champions: Bala Town
- Relegated: Llandyrnog United

The 2008–09 Cymru Alliance was the nineteenth season of the Cymru Alliance after its establishment in 1990. The league was won by Bala Town.

== League table ==
Pos	Team	Pld	W	D	L	GF	GA	GD	Pts	Promotion or relegation
1	Bala Town (C, P)	32	23	6	3	81	23	+58	75	Promotion to Welsh Premier League
2	Holyhead Hotspur	32	23	3	6	71	36	+35	72	
3	Llangefni Town	32	20	7	5	74	27	+47	67	
4	Mynydd Isa	32	19	4	9	73	51	+22	61	
5	Llandudno	32	16	9	7	65	33	+32	57	
6	Ruthin Town	32	18	3	11	56	50	+6	57	
7	Flint Town United (Note: Flint Town United deducted 3 points)	32	16	9	7	81	52	+29	54	
8	Buckley Town	32	12	5	15	45	64	−19	41	
9	Lex XI (Note: Lex XI deducted 3 points)	32	12	7	13	58	62	−4	40	
10	Mold Alexandra	32	10	9	13	62	71	−9	39	
11	Llanfairpwll	32	9	9	14	49	67	−18	36	
12	Denbigh Town	32	9	8	15	40	49	−9	35	
13	Guilsfield	32	11	1	20	52	67	−15	34	
14	Penrhyncoch (Note: Penrhyncoch deducted 3 points)	32	10	5	17	41	72	−31	32	
15	Gresford Athletic	32	7	6	19	32	63	−31	27	
16	Glantraeth	32	4	6	22	40	82	−42	18	
17	Llandyrnog United (R)	32	3	3	26	33	82	−49	12	Relegation to Welsh Alliance

Source: Cymru Alliance
Rules for classification: 1) points; 2) goal difference; 3) number of goals scored.
(C) Champions; (P) Promoted; (R) Relegated
