= 2013–14 Cymru Alliance =

Huws Gray Alliance
- Season: 2013–14
- Teams: 16
- Champions: Cefn Druids
- Promoted: Cefn Druids
- Relegated: Penrhyncoch & Llanrhaedr-Ym-Mochnant
- Matches played: 240
- Goals scored: 816 (3.4 per match)
- Biggest home win: Cefn Druids 10–1 Llanrhaeadr-ym-Mochnant
- Biggest away win: Llanrhaeadr-ym-Mochnant 3–8 Rhydymwyn
- Highest scoring: Caernarfon Town 10–2 Llanrhaeadr-ym-Mochnant

In the 2013–14 season, the Cymru Alliance, a football league in Wales, was won by Cefn Druids, who thus won promotion to the Welsh Premier League.

== Promotion and relegation ==
Two teams were promoted into the league from 2012 to 2013 Feeder Leagues: Llanidloes Town, the Mid Wales Football League champions, and Caernarfon Town, the Welsh Alliance League champions.

No teams joined the league as a result of relegation from the 2012–13 Welsh Premier League.

== Stadia and locations ==
Location of teams in the 2013–14 Cymru Alliance

| Club | Stadium | Location | Capacity |
|---|---|---|---|
| Buckley Town | Globe Way | Buckley | 1,000 |
| Caernarfon Town | The Oval | Caernarfon | 3,000 (500 seated) |
| Caersws | Recreation Ground | Caersws | 4,000 (250 seated) |
| Cefn Druids | The Rock | Wrexham | 3,500 (500 seated) |
| Conwy Borough | Y Morfa | Conwy | 2,500 |
| Flint Town United | Cae-y-Castell | Flint | 1,000 (250 seated) |
| Guilsfield | Community Centre Ground | Guilsfield | - |
| Holyhead Hotspur | The New Stadium | Holyhead | - |
| Llandudno Town | Maesdu Park | Llandudno | 1,013 |
| Llanidloes Town | Victoria Park | Llanidloes | 4,000 |
| Llanrhaeadr-ym-Mochnant | The Recreation Field | Llanrhaeadr-ym-Mochnant | 1,000 (100 seated) |
| Penrhyncoch | Cae Barker | Penrhyncoch | 800 (100 seated) |
| Penycae | Afoneitha Road | Penycae | - |
| Porthmadog | Y Traeth | Porthmadog | 3,000 (1,000 seated) |
| Rhayader Town | The Weirglodd | Rhayader | 2,200 (435 seated) |
| Rhydymwyn | Dolfechlas Road | Rhydymwyn | - |

== League table ==
| Pos | Team | Pld | W | D | L | GF | GA | GD | Pts | Promotion or relegation |
|---|---|---|---|---|---|---|---|---|---|---|
| 1 | Cefn Druids (C, P) | 30 | 22 | 7 | 1 | 90 | 20 | +70 | 73 | Promotion to Welsh Premier League |
| 2 | Conwy Borough | 30 | 19 | 6 | 5 | 66 | 35 | +31 | 63 | |
| 3 | Caernarfon Town | 30 | 18 | 8 | 4 | 79 | 33 | +46 | 62 | |
| 4 | Caersws | 30 | 17 | 10 | 3 | 56 | 32 | +24 | 61 | |
| 5 | Llandudno | 30 | 12 | 9 | 9 | 55 | 42 | +13 | 45 | |
| 6 | Guilsfield | 30 | 10 | 12 | 8 | 44 | 41 | +3 | 42 | |
| 7 | Porthmadog | 30 | 12 | 6 | 12 | 55 | 53 | +2 | 42 | |
| 8 | Flint Town United | 30 | 12 | 5 | 13 | 46 | 53 | −7 | 41 | |
| 9 | Holyhead Hotspur | 30 | 9 | 10 | 11 | 53 | 57 | −4 | 37 | |
| 10 | Penycae | 30 | 10 | 4 | 16 | 47 | 64 | −17 | 34 | |
| 11 | Rhayader Town | 30 | 8 | 9 | 13 | 41 | 60 | −19 | 33 | |
| 12 | Buckley Town | 30 | 6 | 13 | 11 | 41 | 54 | −13 | 31 | |
| 13 | Llanidloes Town | 30 | 8 | 6 | 16 | 44 | 63 | −19 | 30 | |
| 14 | Rhydymwyn | 30 | 8 | 4 | 18 | 32 | 64 | −32 | 28 | |
| 15 | Penrhyncoch (R) | 30 | 5 | 8 | 17 | 35 | 58 | −23 | 23 | Relegation to Welsh Level 3 |
| 16 | Llanrhaeadr-ym-Mochnant (Note: Llanrhaeadr-ym-Mochnant were deducted three points.) (R) | 30 | 5 | 1 | 24 | 32 | 87 | −55 | 13 | Relegation to Welsh Level 3 |

Rules for classification: 1) points; 2) goal difference; 3) number of goals scored.
(C) Champions; (P) Promoted; (R) Relegated

== Results ==
Each team played every other team twice (once at home, and once away) for a total of 30 games.

| Home \ Away | BUC | CRN | CAE | CFN | CON | FLI | GUI | HOL | LNO | LID | LYM | PNR | PNC | PTH | RHY | RHD |
|---|---|---|---|---|---|---|---|---|---|---|---|---|---|---|---|---|
| Buckley Town | | 0–5 | 0–0 | 1–3 | 2–4 | 1–1 | 3–0 | 2–2 | 1–1 | 1–1 | 1–1 | 2–2 | 1–2 | 2–2 | 2–0 | 2–4 |
| Caernarfon Town | 0–0 | | 1–3 | 0–1 | 4–2 | 5–2 | 4–2 | 6–1 | 2–2 | 2–1 | 10–2 | 2–1 | 4–1 | 3–0 | 3–0 | 1–1 |
| Caersws | 2–0 | 0–0 | | 1–3 | 1–1 | 2–0 | 2–2 | 1–0 | 2–2 | 3–0 | 1–0 | 1–1 | 2–2 | 4–3 | 1–0 | 1–1 |
| Cefn Druids | 1–0 | 0–0 | 1–2 | | 1–1 | 6–0 | 0–0 | 1–0 | 5–1 | 7–1 | 10–1 | 1–1 | 4–0 | 1–0 | 7–1 | 4–0 |
| Conwy Borough | 4–0 | 0–2 | 2–3 | 2–2 | | 2–1 | 0–2 | 2–1 | 3–0 | 2–0 | 2–1 | 3–0 | 3–0 | 3–2 | 2–1 | 4–1 |
| Flint Town United | 2–0 | 1–1 | 4–0 | 1–2 | 0–3 | | 2–1 | 6–2 | 1–3 | 2–0 | 1–2 | 1–0 | 0–0 | 1–1 | 3–1 | 1–0 |
| Guilsfield | 3–3 | 3–3 | 1–1 | 0–2 | 0–2 | 2–2 | | 2–1 | 1–1 | 1–1 | 1–3 | 1–0 | 2–0 | 1–2 | 1–1 | 4–2 |
| Holyhead Hotspur | 3–3 | 1–1 | 0–1 | 1–3 | 2–2 | 5–2 | 1–1 | | 0–1 | 4–2 | 2–0 | 5–5 | 4–3 | 2–2 | 3–3 | 1–3 |
| Llandudno Town | 3–1 | 3–2 | 0–0 | 2–3 | 2–3 | 2–1 | 1–1 | 0–0 | | 5–0 | 4–0 | 4–1 | 1–1 | 0–1 | 1–2 | 6–0 |
| Llanidloes Town | 0–0 | 0–5 | 2–3 | 0–5 | 1–2 | 1–2 | 2–1 | 0–1 | 4–1 | | 5–0 | 0–0 | 6–3 | 2–2 | 4–2 | 2–0 |
| Llanrhaeadr-ym-Mochnant | 0–2 | 0–1 | 0–4 | 0–1 | 0–5 | 1–2 | 1–3 | 0–1 | 1–3 | 2–4 | | 1–2 | 0–1 | 1–3 | 2–4 | 3–8 |
| Penrhyncoch | 0–2 | 1–2 | 1–5 | 0–3 | 1–1 | 6–1 | 0–1 | 0–3 | 1–2 | 2–2 | 2–1 | | 2–3 | 0–1 | 1–1 | 2–0 |
| Penycae | 3–1 | 2–3 | 1–3 | 0–0 | 2–1 | 0–1 | 1–3 | 1–4 | 0–3 | 1–3 | 1–2 | 2–0 | | 5–1 | 2–1 | 4–2 |
| Porthmadog | 1–3 | 2–5 | 1–2 | 4–4 | 3–4 | 2–0 | 0–2 | 3–0 | 3–0 | 1–0 | 2–0 | 3–1 | 4–2 | | 1–1 | 0–1 |
| Rhayader Town | 4–4 | 0–2 | 3–2 | 0–4 | 0–0 | 2–1 | 0–2 | 1–1 | 1–1 | 2–0 | 1–5 | 1–2 | 2–1 | 3–1 | | 1–1 |
| Rhydymwyn | 0–1 | 1–0 | 0–3 | 0–5 | 0–1 | 0–4 | 0–0 | 0–2 | 0–2 | 1–0 | 2–1 | 3–0 | 1–3 | 0–4 | 0–2 | |

Legend: Blue = home team win; Yellow = draw; Red = away team win.
