= 2004–05 Cymru Alliance =

Cymru Alliance
- Season: 2004–05
- Champions: Buckley Town
- Relegated: Mold Alexandra; Cemaes Bay

The 2004–05 Cymru Alliance was the fifteenth season of the Cymru Alliance after its establishment in 1990. The league was won by Buckley Town.

== League table ==
Pos	Team	Pld	W	D	L	GF	GA	GD	Pts	Relegation
1	Buckley Town (C)	34	23	8	3	77	36	+41	77	
2	Glantraeth	34	21	7	6	84	33	+51	70	
3	Llangefni Town	34	21	5	8	69	33	+36	68	
4	Bala Town	34	18	6	10	60	41	+19	60	
5	Lex XI	34	16	8	10	86	60	+26	56	
6	Llandyrnog United	34	16	4	14	71	58	+13	52	
7	Guilsfield	34	14	8	12	78	66	+12	50	
8	Gresford Athletic	34	15	5	14	70	62	+8	50	
9	Holywell Town	34	13	7	14	77	64	+13	46	
10	Llandudno	34	12	10	12	66	61	+5	46	
11	Halkyn United	34	13	6	15	71	74	−3	45	
12	Holyhead Hotspur	34	12	6	16	46	63	−17	42	
13	Llanfairpwll	34	11	9	14	55	73	−18	42	
14	Ruthin Town	34	11	7	16	57	70	−13	40	
15	Penrhyncoch	34	9	12	13	62	71	−9	39	
16	Flint Town United	34	9	11	14	50	57	−7	38	
17	Mold Alexandra (R)	34	7	7	20	51	78	−27	28	Relegation to Welsh Level 3
18	Cemaes Bay (Note: Cemaes Bay deducted 2 points) (R)	34	1	2	31	31	161	−130	3	Relegation to Welsh Level 3

Source: Cymru Alliance
Rules for classification: 1) points; 2) goal difference; 3) number of goals scored.
(C) Champions; (R) Relegated
