= 2002–03 Cymru Alliance =

Cymru Alliance
- Season: 2002–03
- Champions: CPD Porthmadog

The 2002–03 Cymru Alliance was the thirteenth season of the Cymru Alliance after its establishment in 1990. The league was won by CPD Porthmadog.

== League table ==
Pos	Team	Pld	W	D	L	GF	GA	GD	Pts	Promotion
1	CPD Porthmadog (C, P)	32	28	2	2	106	19	+87	86	Promotion to Welsh Premier League
2	Llandudno	32	20	7	5	81	41	+40	67	
3	Buckley Town	32	19	7	6	85	34	+51	64	
4	Llangefni Glantraeth	32	21	1	10	78	39	+39	64	
5	Airbus UK	32	17	5	10	70	50	+20	56	
6	Ruthin Town	32	17	3	12	79	45	+34	54	
7	Halkyn United	32	14	9	9	56	57	−1	51	
8	Amlwch Town	32	11	9	12	45	55	−10	42	
9	Lex XI (Note: Lex XI deducted 3 points)	32	13	5	14	83	72	+11	41	
10	Holyhead Hotspur	32	11	8	13	60	62	−2	41	
11	Flint Town United	32	11	7	14	50	61	−11	40	
12	Mold Alexandra	32	8	7	17	35	56	−21	31	
13	Gresford Athletic	32	8	6	18	52	64	−12	30	
14	Llanfairpwll	32	8	5	19	35	66	−31	29	
15	Guilsfield	32	7	7	18	43	86	−43	28	
16	Cemaes Bay	32	7	3	22	41	129	−88	24	
17	Holywell Town (Note: Holywell Town deducted 9 points)	32	4	5	23	33	96	−63	8	

Source: Cymru Alliance
Rules for classification: 1) points; 2) goal difference; 3) number of goals scored.
(C) Champions; (P) Promoted
