= 2006–07 Cymru Alliance =

Cymru Alliance
- Season: 2006–07
- Champions: Llangefni Town

The 2006–07 Cymru Alliance was the seventeenth season of the Cymru Alliance after its establishment in 1990. The league was won by Llangefni Town.

== League table ==
Pos	Team	Pld	W	D	L	GF	GA	GD	Pts	Promotion
1	Llangefni Town (C)	34	21	9	4	68	33	+35	72	Promotion to Welsh Premier League
2	Bala Town	34	21	7	6	80	31	+49	70	
3	Flint Town United	34	20	7	7	70	36	+34	67	
4	Prestatyn Town	34	20	4	10	98	46	+52	64	
5	Glantraeth	34	17	6	11	83	69	+14	57	
6	Llanfairpwll	34	17	6	11	69	59	+10	57	
7	Holyhead Hotspur	34	16	5	13	63	51	+12	53	
8	Mynydd Isa	34	15	8	11	57	45	+12	53	
9	Buckley Town	34	14	10	10	57	53	+4	52	
10	Llandudno	34	14	6	14	67	59	+8	48	
11	Guilsfield	34	14	5	15	58	64	−6	47	
12	Gresford Athletic	34	12	3	19	50	64	−14	39	
13	Penrhyncoch	34	10	8	16	70	75	−5	38	
14	Bodedern	34	11	5	18	49	62	−13	38	
15	Llandyrnog United	34	9	9	16	58	77	−19	36	
16	Ruthin Town	34	8	5	21	41	71	−30	29	
17	Lex XI	34	7	7	20	49	96	−47	28	
18	Queens Park (Note: Queens Park deducted 3 points)	34	3	4	27	40	134	−94	10	

Source: Cymru Alliance
Rules for classification: 1) points; 2) goal difference; 3) number of goals scored.
(C) Champions
