= 2003–04 Cymru Alliance =

Cymru Alliance
- Season: 2003–04
- Champions: Airbus UK
- Relegated: Amlwch Town

The 2003–04 Cymru Alliance was the fourteenth season of the Cymru Alliance after its establishment in 1990. The league was won by Airbus UK.

== League table ==
Pos	Team	Pld	W	D	L	GF	GA	GD	Pts	Promotion or relegation
1	Airbus UK (C, P)	32	27	4	1	88	31	+57	85	Promotion to Welsh Premier League
2	Buckley Town	32	20	6	6	74	33	+41	66	
3	Ruthin Town	32	19	7	6	78	48	+30	64	
4	Glantraeth	32	18	8	6	74	44	+30	62	
5	Llangefni Town	32	15	7	10	71	54	+17	52	
6	Guilsfield	32	15	7	10	68	56	+12	52	
7	Llandudno	32	15	6	11	63	50	+13	51	
8	Halkyn United	32	15	5	12	64	57	+7	50	
9	Llanfairpwll	32	12	7	13	51	52	−1	43	
10	Flint Town United	32	10	9	13	61	62	−1	39	
11	Holyhead Hotspur	32	10	8	14	51	67	−16	38	
12	Lex XI	32	9	8	15	77	85	−8	35	
13	Gresford Athletic	32	10	4	18	48	64	−16	34	
14	Holywell Town	32	8	8	16	38	61	−23	32	
15	Mold Alexandra	32	6	6	20	43	84	−41	24	
16	Cemaes Bay	32	5	7	20	37	70	−33	22	
17	Amlwch Town (R)	32	2	5	25	34	102	−68	11	Relegation to Welsh Alliance

Source: Cymru Alliance
Rules for classification: 1) points; 2) goal difference; 3) number of goals scored.
(C) Champions; (P) Promoted; (R) Relegated
