= 1997–98 Cymru Alliance =

Cymru Alliance
- Season: 1997–98
- Champions: Rhydymwyn
- Relegated: Penycae; Chirk AAA; Llanidloes; Mold Alexandra

The 1997–98 Cymru Alliance was the eighth season of the Cymru Alliance after its establishment in 1990. The league was won by Rhydymwyn.

== League table ==
Pos	Team	Pld	W	D	L	GF	GA	GD	Pts	Promotion or relegation
1	Rhydymwyn (C)	36	25	6	5	86	34	+52	81	
2	Holywell Town (P)	36	24	5	7	72	29	+43	77	Promotion to League of Wales
3	Cefn Druids	36	21	12	3	100	30	+70	75	
4	Knighton Town	36	21	8	7	74	41	+33	71	
5	Glantraeth	36	18	6	12	88	63	+25	60	
6	Penrhyncoch	36	16	8	12	72	67	+5	56	
7	Denbigh Town	36	15	8	13	83	78	+5	53	
8	Oswestry Town (Note: Oswestry Town deducted 12 points)	36	17	11	8	72	49	+23	50	
9	Llandudno	36	14	7	15	60	66	−6	49	
10	Lex XI	36	12	11	13	64	66	−2	47	
11	Llandrindod Wells	36	12	11	13	53	56	−3	47	
12	Ruthin Town	36	12	9	15	57	53	+4	45	
13	Brymbo Broughton	36	12	9	15	39	41	−2	45	
14	Mostyn Town	36	11	8	17	42	65	−23	41	
15	Buckley Town	36	11	8	17	62	88	−26	41	
16	Penycae (R)	36	10	6	20	52	95	−43	36	Relegation to Welsh Level 3
17	Chirk AAA (R)	36	10	4	22	46	74	−28	34	Relegation to Welsh Level 3
18	Llanidloes Town (R)	36	4	7	25	54	110	−56	19	Relegation to Welsh Level 3
19	Mold Alexandra (R)	36	2	6	28	32	102	−70	12	Relegation to Welsh Level 3

Source: Cymru Alliance
Rules for classification: 1) points; 2) goal difference; 3) number of goals scored.
(C) Champions; (P) Promoted; (R) Relegated
