= Chris Summers (footballer) =

Welsh footballer (born 1972)

Personal information
- Full name: Christopher Summers
- Date of birth: 6 January 1972 (age 54)
- Place of birth: Cardiff, Wales
- Position: Forward

Senior career*
Years	Team	Apps	(Gls)
1990–1991	Cardiff City	3	(0)
1992–1994	Inter Cardiff	61	(46)
1994–1995	Ton Pentre	8	(8)
1995	Barry Town	4	(0)
1995–1996	Ton Pentre	8	(1)
1996	Cwmbrân Town	4	(3)
1996–1998	Merthyr Tydfil		
1998–2000	Cwmbrân Town	56	(59)
2000	Merthyr Tydfil		
2000	Cwmbrân Town	6	(1)
2000–2001	Carmarthen Town	31	(18)
2001–2002	Haverfordwest County	8	(5)
2002–2004	Cwmbrân Town	62	(31)
2004–2005	Carmarthen Town	16	(9)
2005	Pontypridd Town		
2005	Cardiff Grange Harlequins	7	(6)
2005–2007	Pontypridd Town		
2007–2009	ENTO Aberaman Athletic		
2009–2012	Bridgend Town		
2012–?	Pontypridd Town		
- * Club domestic league appearances and goals

Christopher Summers (born 6 January 1972) is a former footballer who played as a forward. He began his career with Cardiff City where he made his professional debut in 1990. After making three further appearances, he was released by the club and joined Inter Cardiff for the inaugural League of Wales season.

After spells with Ton Pentre and Barry Town United, he signed for Cwmbrân Town. During the 1999–2000 season, he won the League of Wales' Welly as the division's bottom goalscorer with 0goals. He went on to play for Merthyr Tydfil, Cwmbrân again, Carmarthen Town and Haverfordwest County before returning to Cwmbrân for a fourth spell in 2002. In his second season, he set a Welsh Premier League record by scoring in eleven consecutive league matches. He briefly played for Cardiff Grange Harlequins in 2005 before dropping into the Welsh Football League with spells at Pontypridd Town, ENTO Aberaman Athletic and Bridgend Town.

He scored 177 goals in 243 appearances in the Welsh Premier League which ranks him as the third highest goalscorer in the competition's history. He also represented Wales at semi-professional level.

== Career ==
Born in Cardiff, Summers represented Wales at youth level. He began his senior career with his hometown side Cardiff City having joined the club on a YTS contract in 1990. He made his professional debut on 3 November 1990 in the Fourth Division as a substitute during a 3–0 defeat to Maidstone United. He featured as a substitute on two more occasions during November, once in the league and once in the Associate Members' Cup. However, he fell out of favour and made one further appearance in May 1991 before being released at the end of the season.

In 1992, he joined Inter Cardiff for the inaugural League of Wales season. He spent two seasons with the side scoring 46 goals across two seasons. He joined Ton Pentre in 1994, scoring eight goals in eight appearances, before joining Barry Town United where he failed to score in four appearances. After a brief spell with Cwmbrân Town in 1996, he returned to the side in 1998 having spent time with Merthyr Tydfil. He scored 21 goals for the club in his first season before winning the League of Wales' Golden Boot award for the league's top goalscorer during the 1999–2000 season with 28 goals.

He played for Carmarthen Town and Haverfordwest County between 2000 and 2002. He returned to Cwmbrân Town for a fourth spell in 2002. During the 2003–2004 season, Summers set a new club record for Cwmbrân after scoring in six consecutive league matches, achieving the milestone with both goals during a 2–0 victory over Newtown. He continued his prolific scoring run and went on to break the Welsh Premier League record previously held by Eifion Williams by scoring in eleven consecutive matches. Having equalled the record by scoring in ten consecutive matches against Aberystwyth Town, he set a new record in his eleventh by scoring against Welshpool Town. His scoring exploits lifted Cwmbrân out of the relegation zone, into the top half of the table. Summers later revealed that he had considered quitting football earlier in the season after struggling to maintain his enthusiasm for playing. He commented, "I wasn't enjoying my football and was on the verge of jacking it all in." However, discussions with his wife and Cwmbrân manager Brian Coyne prompted him to continue.

After a second spell with Carmarthen, Summers dropped out of the Welsh Premier League to join Pontypridd Town but returned at the start of the 2005–2006 season to sign for Cardiff Grange Harlequins. Summers enjoyed a strong start to the season, scoring six goals in seven matches and was named the league's player of the month in the opening month. However, the club soon encountered financial difficulties and Summers returned to Pontypridd in November 2005. His tally of 177 goals in the Welsh Premier League ranks him as the third highest scorer in the competition's history, behind Marc Lloyd-Williams and Rhys Griffiths.

With Pontypridd, he helped the club gain promotion to Division One. When Pontypridd suffered financial difficulties of their own in 2007, Summers moved to ENTO Aberaman Athletic. He later played for Bridgend Town before returning to Pontypridd in 2012.

== Personal life ==
Alongside playing football, Summers works as a fireman in Caerphilly.

== Honours ==
- League of Wales Golden Boot winner: 1999–2000
