= 1990–91 Cymru Alliance =

Cymru Alliance
- Season: 1990–91
- Champions: Flint Town United

The 1990–91 Cymru Alliance was the first season of the Cymru Alliance following its establishment earlier in 1990. The league was won by Flint Town United.

== League table ==
Pos	Team	Pld	W	D	L	GF	GA	GD	Pts
1	Flint Town United (C)	26	22	1	3	77	24	+53	67
2	Caersws	26	19	3	4	66	26	+40	60
3	Connah's Quay Nomads	26	16	3	7	54	36	+18	51
4	Lex XI	26	14	6	6	59	41	+18	48
5	Conwy United	26	12	6	8	54	34	+20	42
6	CPD Porthmadog	26	12	5	9	65	40	+25	41
7	Welshpool Town	26	11	7	8	54	40	+14	40
8	Mostyn Town	26	8	7	11	37	60	−23	31
9	Holywell Town	26	6	6	14	29	40	−11	24
10	Llanidloes Town	26	6	6	14	24	51	−27	24
11	Carno	26	7	2	17	26	56	−30	23
12	Mold Alexandra	26	6	5	15	27	66	−39	23
13	Gresford Athletic	26	4	8	14	28	53	−25	20
14	Penrhyncoch	26	4	5	17	27	59	−32	17

Source: Cymru Alliance
Rules for classification: 1) points; 2) goal difference; 3) number of goals scored.
(C) Champions
