= 1999–2000 League of Wales =

League of Wales
- Season: 1999–2000
- Champions: Total Network Solutions
- Relegated: Conwy United; Caernarfon Town
- Champions League: Total Network Solutions
- UEFA Cup: Barry Town; Bangor City
- Intertoto Cup: Cwmbran Town
- Matches played: 306
- Goals scored: 947 (3.09 per match)
- Top goalscorer: Chris Summers (28)

The 1999–2000 League of Wales was the eighth season of the League of Wales since its establishment in 1992. It began on 20 August 1999 and ended on 6 May 2000. The league was won by Total Network Solutions.

== League table ==
Pos	Team	Pld	W	D	L	GF	GA	GD	Pts	Qualification or relegation
1	Total Network Solutions (C)	34	24	4	6	69	37	+32	76	Qualification for Champions League first qualifying round
2	Barry Town	34	23	5	6	98	34	+64	74	Qualification for UEFA Cup qualifying round
3	Cwmbran Town	34	21	6	7	71	37	+34	69	Qualification for Intertoto Cup first round
4	Carmarthen Town	34	22	3	9	68	42	+26	69	
5	Llanelli	34	21	3	10	76	46	+30	66	
6	Aberystwyth Town	34	19	4	11	70	46	+24	61	
7	Connah's Quay Nomads	34	17	6	11	57	35	+22	57	
8	Newtown	34	14	6	14	48	41	+7	48	
9	Bangor City	34	15	3	16	56	61	−5	48	Qualification for UEFA Cup qualifying round (Note: As 1999–2000 Welsh Cup winner)
10	Afan Lido	34	12	10	12	45	43	+2	46	
11	Rhyl	34	13	5	16	40	60	−20	44	
12	Caersws	34	11	8	15	49	50	−1	41	
13	Flexsys Cefn Druids	34	13	2	19	44	63	−19	41	
14	Rhayader Town	34	9	7	18	35	48	−13	34	
15	Haverfordwest County	34	6	11	17	37	65	−28	29	
16	Inter Cardiff (Note: Inter Cardiff deducted one point for not fulfilling a fixture)	34	8	6	20	30	62	−32	29	
17	Conwy United (Note: Conwy United deducted three points for not fulfilling a fixture) (R)	34	6	5	23	33	96	−63	20	Relegation to Welsh Alliance League
18	Caernarfon Town (R)	34	1	8	25	21	81	−60	11	Relegation to Cymru Alliance

Rules for classification: 1) points; 2) goal difference; 3) number of goals scored.
(C) Champions; (R) Relegated

== Results ==
Home \ Away	ABE	AFA	BAN	BAR	CAE	CWS	CMR	CDR	CQN	CON	CWM	HAV	INC	LLA	NTW	RHA	RHY	TNS
Aberystwyth Town		2–0	2–1	3–1	6–0	1–1	2–1	3–0	2–1	1–1	1–2	4–0	1–2	3–1	3–2	3–1	2–1	4–1
Afan Lido	2–1		4–0	0–2	4–0	3–0	0–0	2–2	1–1	3–0	0–0	4–3	3–0	0–0	2–1	3–0	0–1	0–0
Bangor City	1–3	4–1		3–3	1–0	1–3	0–1	3–3	0–2	8–0	1–1	1–0	3–1	1–3	3–2	1–0	3–2	0–2
Barry Town	3–3	5–0	5–2		3–0	1–0	3–1	7–0	3–3	4–1	3–1	3–1	5–1	4–2	4–0	2–0	1–1	5–1
Caernarfon Town	0–0	0–3	1–2	0–3		1–3	0–0	2–3	0–2	0–2	0–2	0–4	0–0	0–2	1–1	3–0	2–3	2–3
Caersws	0–3	3–0	2–5	1–2	2–2		2–1	3–0	0–2	3–3	0–1	1–0	0–3	0–2	0–1	1–1	0–1	0–1
Carmarthen Town	4–3	3–0	0–1	3–2	3–1	3–2		3–0	2–0	4–1	3–1	0–3	0–1	2–1	5–3	1–1	1–0	2–1
Flexsys Cefn Druids	2–0	1–0	1–2	0–1	3–0	1–3	0–2		0–2	3–1	3–2	2–3	2–1	2–1	2–1	0–2	4–0	0–1
Connah's Quay Nomads	0–1	1–1	0–1	2–0	2–1	1–1	0–2	1–0		10–0	1–2	2–2	2–1	1–0	2–0	0–0	2–0	2–4
Conwy United	4–2	0–0	0–2	0–4	4–0	0–4	0–2	1–2	3–2		0–5	1–0	0–2	0–2	0–1	0–3	0–2	4–5
Cwmbran Town	2–1	3–2	6–0	1–0	4–0	1–1	3–1	2–1	0–2	3–1		1–0	3–1	3–1	3–2	1–2	5–0	0–2
Haverfordwest County	0–5	0–2	2–1	0–6	1–1	0–0	1–6	3–0	1–4	1–1	1–1		2–1	1–1	1–1	0–1	2–2	1–1
Inter Cardiff	0–1	1–1	1–0	1–5	1–1	2–7	0–4	0–1	2–0	2–0	1–4	0–0		0–3	0–0	1–1	2–1	1–2
Llanelli	5–0	4–2	4–1	2–1	1–1	3–2	7–2	2–1	2–0	3–2	1–3	3–2	3–1		0–4	2–0	7–0	0–2
Newtown	2–0	0–0	2–0	1–0	5–0	2–3	0–2	4–1	0–1	1–2	2–0	0–0	2–0	1–2		2–1	1–0	0–1
Rhayader Town	0–3	0–1	1–3	0–0	2–1	0–1	1–2	3–1	1–2	5–0	1–1	2–0	1–0	1–3	0–2		2–2	0–1
Rhyl	1–0	1–0	1–0	0–5	2–1	2–0	0–1	2–0	1–4	1–1	1–1	3–1	2–0	1–3	2–3	1–0		2–4
Total Network Solutions	4–1	3–0	2–1	0–2	4–0	0–0	2–1	0–3	1–0	7–0	1–3	4–1	2–0	2–0	0–0	3–1	2–1	

Legend: Blue = home team win; Yellow = draw; Red = away team win.
