= 2005–06 Cymru Alliance =

Cymru Alliance
- Season: 2005–06
- Champions: Glantraeth
- Relegated: Holywell Town; Halkyn United

The 2005–06 Cymru Alliance was the sixteenth season of the Cymru Alliance after its establishment in 1990. The league was won by Glantraeth.

== League table ==
Pos	Team	Pld	W	D	L	GF	GA	GD	Pts	Relegation
1	Glantraeth (C)	34	21	7	6	83	36	+47	70	
2	Buckley Town	34	20	7	7	85	52	+33	67	
3	Flint Town United (Note: Flint Town United deducted 3 points)	34	19	12	3	77	40	+37	66	
4	Guilsfield	34	16	12	6	73	44	+29	60	
5	Llangefni Town	34	17	7	10	68	46	+22	58	
6	Llandudno (Note: Llandudno deducted 3 points)	34	17	8	9	64	40	+24	56	
7	Bala Town	34	14	9	11	63	52	+11	51	
8	Lex XI	34	13	9	12	72	75	−3	48	
9	Bodedern	34	13	6	15	40	58	−18	45	
10	Penrhyncoch	34	13	4	17	62	78	−16	43	
11	Queens Park	34	11	8	15	36	59	−23	41	
12	Llanfairpwll	34	11	6	17	58	73	−15	39	
13	Llandyrnog United	34	10	8	16	51	64	−13	38	
14	Gresford Athletic	34	9	9	16	45	64	−19	36	
15	Ruthin Town	34	7	13	14	43	55	−12	34	
16	Holyhead Hotspur	34	8	9	17	44	68	−24	33	
17	Holywell Town (Note: Holywell Town deducted 3 points) (R)	34	5	12	17	49	72	−23	24	Relegation to Welsh Alliance
18	Halkyn United (R)	34	5	8	21	50	86	−36	23	Relegation to Welsh Alliance

Source: Cymru Alliance
Rules for classification: 1) points; 2) goal difference; 3) number of goals scored.
(C) Champions; (R) Relegated
