= Cymru Alliance =

- Founded: 1990
- Folded: 2019
- Country: Wales
- Divisions: 1
- Number of clubs: 16
- Level on pyramid: 2
- Promotion to: Welsh Premier League
- Relegation to: Welsh National League (Wrexham Area); Welsh Alliance League; Mid Wales League
- Domestic cup(s): Welsh Cup; Cymru Alliance League Cup
- Last champions: Airbus UK Broughton (2nd title)
- Most championships: Caernarfon Town (3 titles)
- Current: 2018–19 season

The Cymru Alliance League (known for sponsorship reasons as Huws Gray Alliance) was a football league in north and central Wales which formed the second level of the Welsh football league system. From the 2019/20 season onwards, it was replaced by the Cymru North.

If the team which finished top of the league held a Domestic Licence, it could apply for promotion to the Welsh Premier League and was replaced by one of the bottom two teams in the Welsh Premier League.

If the league champions did not hold a Domestic Licence, then the team which finished second, if in possession of a Domestic Licence, could be promoted instead. The most successful club in the league was Caernarfon Town with three titles.

The Cymru Alliance also operated the Cymru Alliance League Cup, a knock out competition contested by members of the league

The teams also participated in Welsh Cup, the main Cup competition in Wales.

== Teams in the final 2018–19 season ==
Team	Location	Ground	Position in 2017-18
Airbus UK Broughton	Broughton	The Airfield	3rd
Bangor City	Bangor	Nantporth	2nd in Welsh Premier League
Buckley Town	Buckley	Globe Way	1st in Welsh National League (Wrexham Area) Premier Division
Conwy Borough	Conwy	Y Morfa Stadium	1st in Welsh Alliance League Division 1
Denbigh Town	Denbigh	Central Park	2nd
Flint Town United	Flint	Cae-y-Castell	11th
Gresford Athletic	Gresford	Clappers Lane	8th
Guilsfield	Guilsfield	Guilsfield Community Centre	4th
Holyhead Hotspur	Holyhead	The New Oval	12th
Holywell Town	Holywell	Halkyn Road	5th
Llanrhaeadr YM	Llanrhaeadr-ym-Mochnant	The Recreation Field	1st in Mid Wales Football League Division 1
Penrhyncoch	Penrhyn-coch	Cae Baker	9th
Porthmadog	Porthmadog	Y Traeth	7th
Prestatyn Town	Prestatyn	Bastion Road	12th in Welsh Premier League
Rhyl	Rhyl	Belle Vue	6th
Ruthin Town	Ruthin	Memorial Playing Fields	10th

Locations of teams of the 2018–19 Welsh Alliance League season

== Cymru Alliance Winners (1990–2019) ==
Season	Winner	Runner-up
1990–91	Flint Town United	Caersws
1991–92	Caersws	Llansantffraid
1992–93	Llansantffraid	Welshpool Town
1993–94	Rhyl	Welshpool Town
1994–95	Cemaes Bay	Brymbo
1995–96	Oswestry Town	Welshpool Town
1996–97	Rhayader Town	Rhydymwyn
1997–98	Rhydymwyn	Holywell Town
1998–99	Cefn Druids	Rhydymwyn
1999–00	Oswestry Town	Glantraeth
2000–01	Caernarfon Town	Llangefni Town
2001–02	Welshpool Town	Llangefni Glantraeth
2002–03	Porthmadog	Llandudno
2003–04	Airbus UK Broughton	Buckley Town
2004–05	Buckley Town	Glantraeth
2005–06	Glantraeth	Buckley Town
2006–07	Llangefni Town	Bala Town
2007–08	Prestatyn Town	Bala Town
2008–09	Bala Town	Holyhead Hotspur
2009–10	Llangefni Town	Flint Town United
2010–11	Gap Connah's Quay	Rhyl
2011–12	Gap Connah's Quay	Rhyl
2012–13	Rhyl	Cefn Druids
2013–14	Cefn Druids	Conwy Borough
2014–15	Llandudno	Caernarfon Town
2015–16	Caernarfon Town	Cefn Druids
2016–17	Prestatyn Town	Caernarfon Town
2017–18	Caernarfon Town	Denbigh Town
2018–19	Airbus UK Broughton	Flint Town United

=== Performance by club ===
Club	Winners	Runners-up	Winning Years
Caernarfon Town	3	2	2001, 2016, 2018
Llangefni Town	2	2	2007, 2010
Rhyl	2	2	1994, 2013
Cefn Druids	2	1	1999, 2014
Airbus UK Broughton	2	–	2004, 2019
Gap Connah's Quay	2	–	2011, 2012
Oswestry Town	2	–	1996, 2000
Prestatyn Town	2	–	2008, 2017
Welshpool Town	1	3	2002
Bala Town	1	2	2009
Buckley Town	1	2	2005
Flint Town United	1	2	1991
Glantraeth	1	2	2006
Caersws	1	1	1992
Llandudno	1	1	2015
Llansantffraid	1	1	1993
Cemaes Bay	1	–	1995
Porthmadog	1	–	2003
Rhayader Town	1	–	1997
Rhydymwyn	–	2	–
Brymbo	–	1	–
Conwy Borough	–	1	–
Denbigh Town	-	1	–
Holyhead Hotspur	–	1	–
Holywell Town	–	1	–

== See also ==
- List of association football competitions
- Welsh Football League
