= Ali Hayder =

Iraqi association football player (born 2005)

Personal information
- Full name: Ali Ridha Hayder Ali
- Date of birth: 1 October 2005 (age 21)
- Place of birth: Najaf, Iraq
- Position: Forward

Team information
- Current team: Flint Town United
- Number: 11

Youth career
- Stoke City

Senior career*
Years	Team	Apps	(Gls)
2024	Macclesfield	1	(0)
2024–2025	Nantwich Town	9	(0)
2025	Prestwich Heys		
2025–2026	Al-Talaba	0	(0)
2026	Al-Najaf	5	(0)
2026–	Flint Town United	2	(0)

International career
2024–	Iraq U23	1	(0)
2023–	Iraq	1	(0)
- * Club domestic league appearances and goals as of 06:36, 7 November 2026 (UTC)

Ali Ridha Hayder Ali (Arabic: عَلِيّ رِضَا حَيْدَر عَلِيّ; born 1 October 2005) is an Iraqi footballer who plays as an attacker for Cymru Premier club Flint Town United and the Iraq national football team. In 2023, he made his debut for the senior Iraq team.

== Club career ==
Raised in Manchester, he was a member of the academy at Stoke City. Playing for the Stoke under-18 team, he scored in matches against Liverpool U18 and Manchester City U18. He also featured for the club in the FA Youth Cup.

Hayder joined Northern Premier League side Macclesfield in August 2024. After two months at the club, he left the side and joined Nantwich Town. In February 2025 he moved to Prestwich Hayes.

In July 2025, Hayder joined Iraq Stars League club Al-Talaba.

In October 2026 he joined Flint Town United. He made his club debut on 17 October in an FAW Welsh Cup match against Caernarfon Town.

== Style of play ==
He is described as having good dribbling skills with the ability to shoot with both feet.

== International career ==
Hayder was called up to the Iraq national under-23 football team for the first time in March 2023 for the Doha International Cup. In March 2024, he made his debut for Iraq U23 against Australia U23.

He was called up to the senior Iraq national football team in October 2023, and was an unused substitute against Qatar on 13 October 2023. He made his international debut on 17 October 2023 for Iraq in a friendly match against Jordan.
