= Thomas Bartley (footballer) =

Welsh footballer

Personal information
- Full name: Thomas Bartley
- Date of birth: 1874
- Place of birth: Flint, Wales
- Date of death: 24 December 1951 (aged 77)
- Place of death: Newton-le-Willows, England
- Position: Inside right

Senior career*
| Years | Team | Apps | (Gls) |
| 1890–1896 | Flint | | |
| 1896–1897 | Port Sunlight | | |
| 1897–1899 | Glossop North End | 7 | (2) |
| 1899–1900 | Llandudno | | |
| 1901–1902 | Earlestown | | |
| 1902–1903 | Ashton Wanderers | | |
| 1903–19?? | Earlestown | | |

International career
| 1898 | Wales | 1 | (0) |
- * Club domestic league appearances and goals

Thomas Bartley (1874 – 24 December 1951) was a Welsh footballer who played as an inside forward for various clubs in the 1890s and 1900s and made one appearance for Wales.

== Football career ==
Bartley was born in Flint in North Wales and played for his local club in the North Wales Coast League as well as reaching the first final of the Welsh Amateur Cup in 1891. At Flint, he gained a reputation for his goal-scoring, although he did "tend towards rough play". His older brother, Arthur, played as goalkeeper for Flint and died from injuries sustained during a match in August 1891, thus becoming the first known fatality in modern Welsh football.

In 1896, he moved to England spending a year at Port Sunlight in the Wirral & District League before he was signed for Glossop North End. Described as "good in the air and possessing a rasping shot", Bartley "infused bite and determination into the (Glossop) forward line".

Glossop NE were backed by Samuel Hill-Wood with ambitions of reaching the English Football League. Having finished as runners-up in the Midland League in the 1896–97 season, they could only manage to finish ninth in Bartley's first season. Despite this, they were invited to join an expanded Football League Second Division, finishing as runners-up in 1898–99. Bartley played in Glossop's opening match in the Football League in September 1898 against Blackpool. During his one season in the Football League, Bartley made seven appearances, scoring twice. He didn't play in the First Division and in the summer of 1899 returned to North Wales to spend a year at Llandudno.

Bartley's solitary international appearance came in March 1898, when he replaced Thomas Thomas for the Home Championship match against England; the match finished 3–0 in favour of England.

In 1901, he returned to Lancashire where he settled at Newton-le-Willows for the rest of his life. He joined Earlestown, where he became known for his "splendid ball control" and heading ability. In particular, he was renowned for his ability to place a corner kick under the crossbar, providing scoring opportunities for his fellow forwards. Described as "a great utility player", he was able to take over from an injured player anywhere on the pitch.

== Later career ==
During World War I, Bartley enlisted in the Royal Welch Fusiliers. He later worked as a wood machinist in a railway wagon works. He remained associated with the Earlestown club for the rest of his life, spending some time on the club committee.

He died on 24 December 1951, aged 77.

== Honours ==
Flint

- Welsh Amateur Cup finalists: 1891

Glossop North End

- Football League Second Division runners-up: 1898–99
