= Flint Town United F.C. =

Association football club in Wales

Coordinates: 53°14′57″N 3°07′33″W

Flint Town United
- Full name: Flint Town United Football Club
- Nickname: The Silkmen
- Founded: 1886; 140 years ago (as Flint Football Club)
- Ground: Essity Stadium, Flint
- Capacity: 1,000 (250 Seated)
- Chairman: Darryl Williams
- Manager: Danny Holmes
- League: Cymru Premier
- 2025–26: Cymru Premier, 10th of 12
- Website: flinttownunitedfc.co.uk
Home colours	Away colours

Flint Town United Football Club is a football club based in Flint, Flintshire, Wales who play in the Cymru Premier.

Nicknamed "the Silkmen", they play their home games at Cae-y-Castell also known as the 'Essity Stadium' following their sponsorship deal. "The Castle Field", Flint.

== History ==
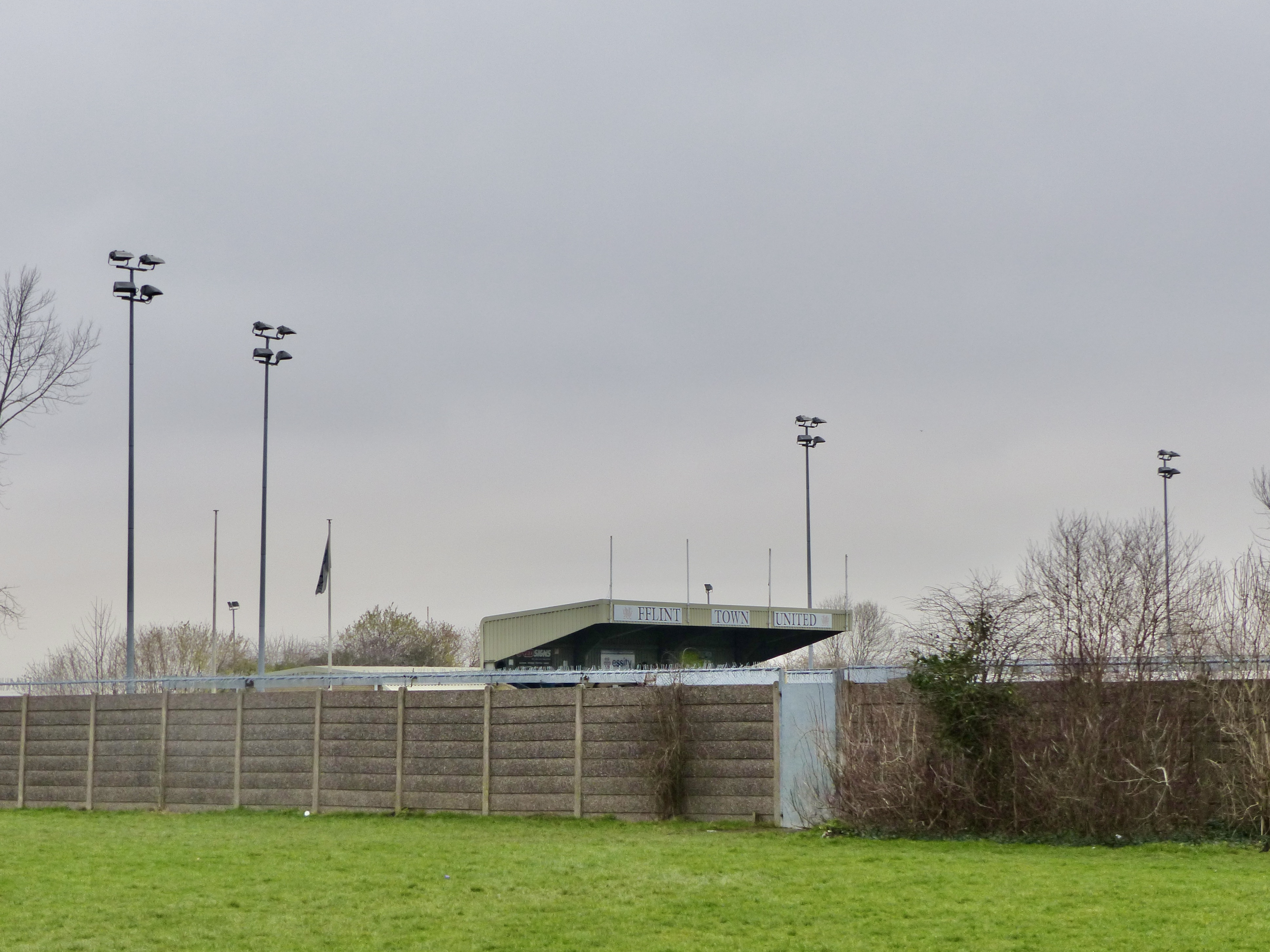
Cae-y-Castell

Founded in 1886 as Flint F.C.; playing at Strand Park which was located on the banks of the Dee Estuary. The club made an early impression by reaching the first Welsh Amateur Cup final in 1890–91, losing to Wrexham Victoria 4–1.

Arthur Bartley, who played as goalkeeper for Flint, died from injuries sustained during a match in August 1891, thus becoming the first known fatality in modern Welsh football. He was the older brother of Welsh international, Thomas Bartley, who spent six years with Flint at the start of his career.

Founder members of the North Wales Coast League the club won the inaugural championship in 1893–94 by two points over runners-up Llandudno Swifts, remaining unbeaten in their twelve games. The next two seasons the club finished in the runners-up position before resigning from the league to join the newly formed Flintshire League. By the turn of the century the town of Flint had three teams; Flint Town, Flint Athletic and Flint UAC (United Alkali Company) In 1905, Flint UAC and Flint Town amalgamated, taking the name of Flint Town. In 1909, as a Chester and District League side the club won their first major cup by defeating Pwllheli 1–0 in the final of the North Wales Amateur Cup.

In 1924 the club left Stand Park for a new ground at Holywell Road, which became their home till 1993. The new ground was then better equipped and could hold up to 3,000 spectators. These size of crowds were common in the 1920s, they were keen to see Flint's part-time professionals play. Led by Captain Emlyn Jones, Flint reached the 1925 Welsh Cup final only to lose to Wrexham's professional team by 3 goals to 1. Regular cup successes were to follow however, as Flint won the North Wales Amateur Cup on three occasions between 1931 and 1932.

Flint Town featured in the Welsh National League (North) throughout to 1920s, becoming runners-up to Owestry Town in the 1923–24 season. In 1930 Flint Town joined the newly formed Welsh League which operated between 1930 and 1935, winning the title in 1933–34 season, scoring 99 goals in only eighteen games.

Between 1937 and 1949, apart from the war years, Flint Town played their football in the West Cheshire League, while Flint Athletic continued to play in the Dyserth League winning the title in 1938 and 1939.

== Flint Town United ==
At a largely attended public meeting at the Town Hall on Thursday 27 June 1946, it was unanimously decided to form a new football club in Flint under the name of Flint Town United from the amalgamation of Flint Town and Flint Athletic.

Flint Town United entered the Welsh League (North) for the 1949–50 season, finishing runners-up to Holyhead Town. By this time, however, the club had already won the Welsh Amateur Cup, having defeated Troedyrhiw 2–1 in the 1947–48 final.

Under the management of Billy Russell, Flint became a formidable side in the early 50s, with the pinnacle achievement coming in 1954 when they won the Welsh Senior Cup. Inspired by Welsh international Billy Hughes, whose career had been disrupted by the war, Flint Town United overcame Holywell Town, Oswestry Town, Rhyl, Llanelly and First Division Cardiff City in a semi-final 2–1 win in front of a crowd of 10,683 at the Racecourse Ground, Wrexham. The club went on to beat third division Chester City 2–0 in the final, again at the Racecourse Ground, in front of a crowd of 15,584. Within five years of those golden seasons, the club slipped into the lower reaches of the league culminating in relegation at the end of the 1961–62 season.

During the 1960s, the crowds of past years disappeared, bringing a decline in the club's fortunes. Now playing in local leagues, the club relied on local players. The only bright spots in this decade were Flint Town Utd Youth winning the Welsh Youth Cup in 1965 and the Welsh Amateur Cup in 1969. During the 1970s and 80s, the club moved between various leagues, becoming league champions of the Welsh League (North) in the 1988–89 season.

1990 saw the transformation of Welsh Football with the formation of two new leagues. The Cymru Alliance combined teams playing in the Welsh League (North), Welsh National League (Wrexham), Clwyd League and the Mid-Wales League, while South Wales amalgamated their own leagues, which was to become the forerunner of the League of Wales. In that same season, the club appointed Tony Martin as their new manager, with Les Davies his assistant. That season saw the club become the new league's first champions, and also won the North Wales Challenge Cup for the first time in the club's history. To finalise an excellent season, they overcame South Wales Champions Abergavenny 2–1, in the only Welsh Non-League final. The following season, 1991–92, the club just failed to hold onto the title.

In 1993, the club became founder members of the League of Wales. The following season, the club again moved to a new ground, back to the banks of the Dee Estuary. After five years in the League of Wales, with no main sponsorship and ground upkeep, the club lost its place in the league after finishing third from bottom, being relegated due to the League of Wales reducing the number of teams within the league under UEFA rules.

Since then the club has been in the middle regions of the league, with the 2004–05 season being one of its worst, finishing fourth from bottom. In the 2005–06 season the club produced a remarkable recovery. Although they were knocked out of cup competitions in early rounds, the league was beyond anyone's expectations. The season got off to a good start with a home win, but inconsistency became a regular occurrence. That was until 22 October 2005 when a bad defeat at the hands of Ruthin Town turned the club's fortunes around, going 25 leagues games without defeat, the only blip being beaten by Denbigh Town in the N.W Challenge Cup. The club missed out on promotion to the Welsh Premier League by one point, having had three points deducted for a non-fulfillment of a mid-week fixture at Gresford Ath.

The 2007–08 season the club was hardly out of the top three, but a bad run of results in March, picking up only three points out of five games and then another bad run, three points out a possible twelve late on in the season put the League Championship out of reach. Consolation was winning the North Wales Challenge Cup at Colwyn Bay, beating league rivals Prestatyn Town 1–0.

The following season seen an up and down league and cup performance, but in April a six-match unbeaten run moved the club into third position in the league. In the last game of the season another one of those poor performances returned when the club was well beaten by fellow Cymru Alliance club Llandudno Town 4–1 in the final of the North Wales Challenge Cup, to end a disappointing season.

As that season ended the club looked forward to a better year, but again it turned out to be another one of those seasons. A disastrous 1-nil defeat in the third round of the Welsh Cup by South Wales 3rd division side AFC Llwydcoed, made worse when they were drawn at home to Aberystwyth Town. Only three games played between December and the beginning of February due to the weather and a home defeat by Connahs Quay Nomads in the 1st round of the N.W Challenge Cup.

With the reformation of the Welsh Premier League set for the 2010–11 season the club's sole intention for the 2009–10 season was to finish in the top eight. As the season drew to a close the club was nine points ahead, but in the last four league games managed to pick up only five points out of a total of 12, losing the league to Llangefni Town by four points. In the final game of the season the club lost to Llandudno Town 2–0 in the League Cup Final, with Llandudno's keeper Paul Whitfield picking up the "Man of the Match Award".

Niall McGuinness was named the manager of Flint Town United F.C in November 2017 after Andy Holden, a former Everton and Hibernian coach, stepped down after a series of mediocre results.

== Rivalries ==
Flint Town United F.C.'s traditional rivals are Holywell Town and Connah's Quay Nomads.

== Current squad ==
As of 23 October 2026

Note: Flags indicate national team as defined under FIFA eligibility rules; some limited exceptions apply. Players may hold more than one non-FIFA nationality.

No.	Pos.	Nation	Player
1	GK	ENG	Jack Flint
2	DF	WAL	Harry Dean
3	DF	ENG	Mikey Burke
4	DF	ENG	Harrison McGahey
5	DF	WAL	Harry Owen (captain)
6	MF	ENG	Jack Thorn
7	MF	GBS	Lassana Mendes
8	MF	WAL	Ben Hughes
9	FW	BEL	Tunde Owolabi

No.	Pos.	Nation	Player
10	FW	ENG	Joe Malkin
11	FW	IRQ	Ali Hayder
13	GK	ENG	Zack Dempsey
14	DF	ENG	Charlie Wilson
16	DF	ENG	Namory Kane
17	DF	ENG	Ben Woollam (on loan from The New Saints)
18	DF	WAL	Levi Morrison
19	DF	ENG	Lee Jonas
23	MF	ENG	Isaac Modi

=== Development Team ===
The following players have been included in first team match day squads this season.

Note: Flags indicate national team as defined under FIFA eligibility rules; some limited exceptions apply. Players may hold more than one non-FIFA nationality.

No.	Pos.	Nation	Player
27	MF	WAL	Lucian Morris
28	DF	ENG	Raphael Vilches-Melson
33	FW	ENG	Alex Lear
36		ENG	Jack Edwards
37		ENG	A. O'Neill
39	FW	ENG	Marquez Yusuf
40		ESP	F. Okpara
42	DF	ENG	Jack Tracy

No.	Pos.	Nation	Player
45	FW	ENG	Joe Atkin
46	GK	ENG	Jack Williams
47		ENG	Sonny Faulkner
66		WAL	Rhys Ineson
80		ENG	K. Kwok
—		ENG	Leon Crown
—		ENG	G. Harris

=== Out on loan ===
Note: Flags indicate national team as defined under FIFA eligibility rules; some limited exceptions apply. Players may hold more than one non-FIFA nationality.

No.	Pos.	Nation	Player
15	MF	WAL	Jack Coll (at Rhyl 1879 until January 2027.)

== Coaching staff ==
First-team

Position	Staff
Manager	(Wales) Lee Fowler
Assistant Manager	(Wales) Steve Evans
Goalkeeping Coach	(Wales) Dan Connell
Coach	(Wales) Martin Jones

== Recent history ==
Season	League	Position	P	W	D	L	F	A	Pts
1987–88	Welsh Alliance	13th	30	7	7	16	44	60	21
1988–89	Welsh Alliance	1st	32	23	4	5	72	26	73
1989–90	Welsh Alliance	7th	34	16	5	13	61	54	53
1990–91	Cymru Alliance	1st	26	22	1	3	77	24	67
1991–92	Cymru Alliance	4th	30	14	9	7	58	37	51
1992–93	League of Wales	16th	38	11	6	21	47	67	39
1993–94	League of Wales	4th	38	20	6	12	70	47	66
1994–95	League of Wales	6th	38	20	3	15	77	60	63
1995–96	League of Wales	5th	40	19	9	12	76	57	66
1996–97	League of Wales	15th	40	11	8	21	48	76	41
1997–98	League of Wales	18th	38	9	7	22	50	77	34
1998–99	Cymru Alliance	3rd	30	14	6	10	60	44	48
1999–2000	Cymru Alliance	6th	32	16	8	8	65	43	56
2000–01	Cymru Alliance	17th	32	6	4	22	43	85	13
2001–02	Cymru Alliance	14th	34	8	7	19	40	58	31
2002–03	Cymru Alliance	11th	32	11	7	14	50	61	40
2003–04	Cymru Alliance	10th	32	10	9	13	61	60	39
2004–05	Cymru Alliance	16th	34	9	11	14	50	57	38
2005–06	Cymru Alliance	3rd	34	19	12	3	77	40	66*
2006–07	Cymru Alliance	3rd	34	20	7	7	70	36	67
2007–08	Cymru Alliance	3rd	34	16	10	6	62	42	58
2008–09	Cymru Alliance	7th	32	16	9	7	81	52	54*
2009–10	Cymru Alliance	2nd	32	23	6	3	84	29	75
2010–11	Cymru Alliance	7th	30	13	7	10	64	55	46
2011–12	Cymru Alliance	9th	30	13	7	10	59	47	46
2012–13	Cymru Alliance	6th	30	14	6	10	61	51	48
2013–14	Cymru Alliance	8th	30	12	5	13	46	53	41
2014–15	Cymru Alliance	10th	30	13	5	12	39	45	44
2015–16	Cymru Alliance	9th	30	13	3	14	54	45	42
2016–17	Cymru Alliance	6th	30	14	6	10	62	47	48
2017–18	Cymru Alliance	11th	28	10	6	12	49	42	30
2018–19	Cymru Alliance	2nd	30	17	7	6	52	31	58
2019–20	Cymru North	2nd	22	15	4	3	59	22	49
2020–21	Cymru Premier	11th	32	10	2	20	38	58	32
2021–22	Cymru Premier	5th	32	12	6	14	51	53	42
2022–23	Cymru Premier	11th	32	9	8	15	41	53	35
2023–24	Cymru North	2nd	30	25	3	2	94	30	78
2024–25	Cymru Premier	9th	32	13	3	16	48	62	42
2025–26	Cymru Premier	10th	32	8	11	13	48	59	35

Key: P = Played; W = Won; D = Drawn; L = Lost; F = Goals for; A = Goals against; Pts = Points
* = 3pts deducted

== Honours ==
=== Leagues ===
- North Wales Coast League
  - Champions: 1893–94
  - Runners-up: 1894–95, 1895–96
- Welsh National League (North)
  - Runners-up: 1923–24
- Welsh Football League
  - Champions: 1933–34
  - Runners-up: 1934–35
- Welsh League North
  - Champions: 1954–55, 1955–56, 1956–57
  - Runners-up: 1936-37, 1951-52, 1952-53, 1980–81
- Clwyd Football League
  - Champions: 1978–79, 1993–94 (reserves)
- Welsh Alliance League
  - Champions: 1989–90
  - Runners-up: 2009-10, 2018-19
- Cymru Alliance
  - Champions: 1990–91
  - Runners-up: 2009–10, 2018–19
- Cymru North
  - Runners-up: 2019–20, 2023–24
- Welsh National League (Wrexham Area) Reserves & Colts Division
  - Champions: 2016–17

=== Cups ===
- Welsh Cup
  - Winners: 1953–54
  - Finalists: 1924–25, 2025–26
- Welsh Junior Cup/ Welsh Amateur Cup/ FAW Intermediate Cup
  - Winners: 1947–48
  - Finalists: 1890–91, 1978–79
- Cymru Alliance League Cup
  - Winners: 2017-18
  - Runners-up 1991-92, 2009-10, 2013-14, 2015-16, 2015-17
- FAW Welsh Youth Cup
  - Winners: 1964–65
  - Finalists: 1966–67, 2022
- North Wales Challenge Cup
  - Winners: 1990-91, 2006-07
  - Runners-up: 1992-93, 1998-99, 2007-08, 2010-11
- North East Wales Challenge Cup
  - Runners-up 2012-13
- North Wales Amateur Cup/ Intermediate Cup
  - Winners 1909–10, 1930–31, 1931–32, 1932–33, 1933–34, 1934–35, 1935–36 1968–69, 1976–77
- North Wales Junior Cup
  - Winners 1899–1900 (reserves)
