= Welshpool Town F.C. =

Association football club in Wales

Welshpool
- Full name: Welshpool Football Club
- Nickname: Lillywhites
- Founded: 28 August 1877
- Ground: Maes y Dre Recreation Ground, Welshpool
- Capacity: 3,000 (257 seated)
- Manager: Gary Jones
- League: Central Wales Northern Division
- 2025–26: Central Wales Northern Division, 11th of 15
Home colours	Away colours

Welshpool Football Club (Welsh: Clwb Pêl-droed Y Trallwng) is a football club based in Welshpool, playing in the Central Wales Northern Division.

The club was founded as Welshpool Football Club on 28 August 1877 following a meeting at the National Schoolroom. They play at the Maes y Dre Recreation Ground, Welshpool, playing in the Ardal Leagues North East.

== History ==
Welshpool Town was formed on 28 August 1877 but adopted such colourful names as Welshpool Wanderers and Welshpool Warriors – although the latter may have been a separate club. The club reformed as Welshpool Powysland FC in September 1889 after one season as Welshpool United, and briefly flirted with the Shropshire League. Following the 1889 reformation, pink and slate were chosen as the club colours.

After the First World War the club were reformed as Welshpool United, and played on a field next to the canal-side, in red shirts and white shorts. They competed in the Central Wales leagues, winning the Central Section in 1921. Four years later in 1925 the club stepped up to the First Division (North) after finishing as runners up to Llanidloes Town.

After the Second World War Welshpool moved to the Welsh National League (Wrexham area). Success followed including Welsh National League Champions titles: 1955, 1956, 1962 and 1965. The club then returned to the Mid Wales League, which it won seven times between 1968 and 1980, as well as winning the Welsh Amateur Cup in 1972. The club continued to be a force in Mid Wales football throughout the 1970s and 1980s, and they applied to be founder members of the Cymru Alliance in 1990. They finished second in 1993 and 1996; and as champions Oswestry Town were not eligible for promotion, Welshpool took their place in the League of Wales in the 1996–97 season instead, finishing 17th.

Next season they were relegated, and stayed in the Alliance until they won the competition in 2002. In the 2002–03 season they finished next to bottom, but appealed against relegation to the FAW, because Neath were denied promotion as they failed to meet Welsh Premier ground criteria. To the surprise of many, they were reinstated in the League for 2003–04.

In the 2005–06 season, the club finished 6th in the Welsh Premier League, their highest finish in the league to date.

=== Successive relegations ===
Due to the Welsh Premier League restructuring, the club lost their place in the top flight after not applying for a domestic licence. Life in the Cymru Alliance got off to a disastrous start: after picking up just 4 points from their first six games, they were deducted 15 points for fielding ineligible players.

Manager Graham Evans resigned shortly afterwards, three months into the job, citing a breakdown in relations with the chairman. Head Coach Benji Evans took charge as caretaker manager, before Guilsfield boss, Mike Barton, took over the reins. However, just a month into his reign, he too quit the club. A further three points were deducted for the club failing to fulfil the fixture at Penrhyncoch. Benji Evans again took charge as caretaker manager, before the club recruited Connah's Quay striker Chris Herbert as player manager, his first management post. Over the remaining months of the season, Herbert and Evans completely restructured the playing squad, bringing in various quality and experienced players, and results improved dramatically. Their efforts were not good enough to prevent the club's second successive relegation, due to their massive points deficit, but they did get back into positive points before the end of the season. However, on the final day of the season, away at Rhyl FC, a suspended John Keegan appeared in the starting line-up and the club forfeited another three points, ending the campaign at rock bottom on zero points.

=== Fightback ===
In the summer of 2011, the club's sponsorship agreement with Technogroup ended, and the side reverted to the name of Welshpool Football Club. This affected the club's finances, and the club became fully amateur. Manager Chris Herbert, took up the position of Assistant Manager of Rhyl FC.

The club appointed Reserve Manager, Adam Knight, to the position of Manager following his side's success in the Montgomeryshire Amateur League Division 2. The club's existence was thrown into jeopardy when Knight resigned two weeks before the season and the club had no registered players. However, the Spar Mid Wales League agreed to postpone the club's opening three fixtures to allow time for a new manager to be appointed. Local players David Jones and Neil Breeze took control of the side and pulled together a team in time for the opening match with title favourites Montgomery Town FC.

Following Welshpool's 10–1 defeat to local rivals Waterloo Rovers on Boxing Day 2011, Sky Sports presenter Jeff Stelling made a joke at the club's expense on Soccer Saturday. Manager David Jones then wrote to the programme explaining the club's plight; he said the heavy scoreline was largely the result of him having to spend the second half as a stand-in goalkeeper. The letter was read live on air by Stelling, and Soccer Saturday reporter and ex-professional player Chris Kamara then offered to turn out for the club to aid their fight against relegation.

Kamara made his debut on 28 January 2012, but could not prevent a 6–1 home defeat to Rhayader Town, though he did provide the corner that led to Welshpool's goal early in the second half with the score at 2–0.

Because of transfer rules, Kamara was signed to the club until the end of the 2011–12 season, and played for the team again when they hosted Newbridge-on-Wye on 28 March 2012. He was joined in that match by another former professional player and Soccer Saturday regular, Paul Merson, who also signed up to Welshpool. Merson scored in the match, but Welshpool still lost 4–1.

Manager David Jones was relieved of his duties as manager on 3 June 2013, and during the summer Welshpool Town brought back ex-manager Russell Cadwallader, who had had a successful period as manager during the late 1990s and early 2000s. David Jones was offered the role of Assistant Manager, but choose to move to local rivals Berriew as manager. In 2014–15 Welshpool finished 10th in the Mid Wales League Division 1, winning nine, drawing eight and losing 13, scoring 58 goals and conceding 75.

During the 2023–24 season, the club struggled with player numbers, which led to the reserve team folding and a number of the reserve team playing for the firsts. The club finished season without a win and were relegated.

== Honours ==
- Cymru Alliance – Winners (1): 2001–02
- Cymru Alliance – Runners-Up (3): 1992–93; 1993–94; 1995–96
- Mid Wales League - Champions (7): 1967–68; 1968–69; 1970–71; 1972–73; 1974–75; 1976–77; 1979–80
- Welsh National League (Wrexham Area) – Champions (4): 1954–55; 1956–57; 1961–62; 1964–65
- Welsh Amateur Cup – Winners: 1971–72
- Central Wales Challenge Cup – Winners: 1970–71, 1973–74, 1976–77, 1979–80, 1989–90, 1993–94, 1998–99, 1999–2000, 2001–02
- Montgomeryshire Challenge Cup - Winners: 1950–51, 1999–2000
- Mid Wales League Cup – Runners–up: 2017–18

== Biggest victories and losses ==
- Biggest League of Wales win: 8–0 v Cemaes Bay in 1998.
- Biggest League of Wales defeat: 0–8 at Barry Town in 1997.
