= Rhayader Town F.C. =

Association football club in Wales

Coordinates: 52°17′54″N 3°30′35″W

Rhayader Town
- Full name: Rhayader Town Football Club
- Nicknames: Thin Red Line, The Red Kites
- Founded: 2007
- Ground: The Weirglodd; Rhayader; Powys
- Capacity: 2,200
- Chairman: Gareth Earp
- Manager: Eifion Price
- League: Central Wales Southern Division
- 2025–26: Central Wales Southern Division, 3rd of 13
Home colours	Away colours

Rhayader Town Football Club (Welsh: Clwb Pêl-droed Tref Rhaeadr Gwy) are a Welsh football team. The club dates from around 1884 and their ground is called Y Weirglodd, which accommodates 435 seated spectators. The club plays in the Central Wales Southern Division.

== History ==
The club was first recorded as existing in 1883 with the Montgomeryshire Express recording Rhayader Football Club losing 3–2 at Llanidloes. They first entered the Mid Wales League in 1921, winning their first title in 1925 before dropping out of the league in 1927. The club returned the following season but once again disappeared in 1930 and remained absent until 1936 when they were founder members of the newly organised Central Wales League. After World War Two the club returned to the Central Wales League, before they withdrew in 1951. The club joined the Mid Wales League South in 1962 before returning to the Mid Wales League in 1965 where they played among the lower placed teams for the next 20 years. In 1988 they finished in fifth-placed finish, their highest in the league since rejoining in the 1960s, only to end second from the bottom of the table in the following two seasons.

In 1992 the club joined the new North Wales premier league, the Cymru Alliance. The finished sixth 1996 before being crowned champions in 1997 to become Radnorshire's first ever representatives in the League of Wales. The club spent five years in the top flight of Welsh football, the League of Wales, with a best finish of 12th, before being relegated in 2002. During this period, the club signed the Brazilian player Jose Ricardo Rodrigues Ferreira (known as "Junior").

Rhayader Town folded in July 2006 and resigned from the Spar Mid Wales League.

A new Rhayader club formed in 2007 and played in the Mid Wales South League for the 2007–08 season. Playing again in Mid Wales League in 2008–09 after gaining promotion from Mid Wales South Division 1, the team managed to finish an impressive sixth in the league with 55 points on the board. The 2009–10 season saw the side promoted into the Cymru Alliance and only one step away from the top flight.

The 2009–10 season also saw the rebirth of a reserve squad. The first team were promoted to the Cymru Alliance that season but lasted just the 2010–11 season before being relegated. They bounced back however and in 2012–13 they took their place back in the Cymru Alliance.

The club was relegated from the Cymru Alliance in 2015 and in 2017 gained promotion back to the league. However, citing the difficulties of obtaining enough players to travel distances to matches, the club resigned from the league in July 2017 before the 2017–18 season commenced.

== Honours ==
- Cymru Alliance – Champions: 1996–97
- Mid Wales League – Champions: 1924–25, 2011–12, 2016–17
- Mid Wales South League – Champions: 2007–08, 2010–11 (reserves), 2012–13 (reserves), 2013–14 (reserves), 2015–16 (reserves), 2017–18 (reserves)
- Mid Wales League – Runners-up: 2009–10
- Mid Wales South League Cup – Winners: 1993–94 (reserves), 2007–08,, 2012–13 (reserves), 2015–16 (reserves), 2016–17, 2017–18 (reserves)
- Central Wales Cup – Winners: 1996–97
- Central Wales Cup – Finalists: 2016–17
- Radnorshire Cup – Winners: 1966–67, 1976–77, 2000–01, 2001–02, 2008–09, 2012–13, 2013–14, 2014–15
- Radnorshire Cup – Finalists: 1963–64, 1981–82, 1987–88, 1994–95, 2015–16
- Penybont Cup – Winners: 2025
