= Denbigh Town F.C. =

Association football club in Wales

Coordinates: 53°11′2.2″N 3°24′36.8″W

Denbigh Town
- Full name: Denbigh Town Football Club
- Nicknames: The Reds, The Town
- Founded: 1876; 150 years ago
- Ground: Central Park; Denbigh
- Chairman: Shon Powell
- League: Cymru North
- 2025–26: Cymru North, 8th of 16
- Website: http://www.denbightownfc.co.uk
Home colours	Away colours

Denbigh Town Football Club, founded in 1876, is a semi-professional football club based in Denbigh, North Wales. They play in the Cymru North. The club plays home matches at Central Park.

== Club history ==
=== Early years ===
The club was founded in 1876 when a group of soldiers formed the side at 'The Parks' in the Town. The club played under a series of names including 'Town', Caledfryn Rangers and in 1921 when, as Denbigh Town, they were members of the North Wales Coast League, they amalgamated with Denbigh Mental Hospital of the Rhyl & District League to form Denbigh United. Under that title they became founder members of the new Welsh National League - Division One (North) where they remained until the league closed down in 1930, winning both the Welsh Amateur Cup and the North Wales Coast Amateur Cup in 1924. However financial problems caused the club to cease activity in 1930, their place in the town being taken by Denbigh Juniors (formed 1924). In 1932, Juniors changed their name to Denbigh Town.

During the 1970s, under manager John Trevor Roberts, the club won the Welsh National League (Wrexham Area) Division One Championship four times and the League Cup five times, as well as the 1970 North Wales Coast Amateur Cup and the 1972 North Wales Coast Amateur Cup.

=== Clwyd League ===
In the early 1980s Denbigh Town left the Wrexham Area League and joined the Clwyd Football League. The club was promoted to the Premier Division in 1992, under managers Bill Dawson and Roy Cook-Hannah. During the same season the club secured a 1–0 North Wales Challenge Cup victory over Caernarfon Town, then a semi-professional side sitting fourth in the Northern Premier League.

For the 1994–95 season the club won promotion to the Fitlock Welsh Alliance League, finishing fourth in 1995. In the 1995–96 season Denbigh Town won the League Championship and Cookson Cup double.

=== Cymru Alliance ===
In the 1996–97 season the club played in the Cymru Alliance. They were relegated in 2001–02 but regained promotion in 2006–07.

=== Welsh Alliance ===
Between 2002 and 2007 Denbigh Town played in the Welsh Alliance, reaching the semi-final of the 2002–03 Barritt Cup and winning the Alves Cup the same year. On 8 December 2003 manager Roy Cook-Hannah resigned; he was replaced by caretaker coaches Clwyd Williams and Nick Hailes on 11 December 2003. Denbigh finished the 2003–04 season in 12th place with 36 points from 30 matches.

Tim Dyer was appointed manager on 6 May 2004, and in 2005–06 guided the club to the Barritt Cup and Cookson Cup double. Denbigh Town finished the season as runners up in the Welsh Alliance League and winners of the Welsh Alliance Fair Play League, and reached the final of the North Wales Coast FA Challenge Cup.

=== Return to Cymru Alliance ===
Denbigh Town were again promoted into the Cymru Alliance on 9 April 2007, when Llanrwst United failed to beat Holywell Town at Halkyn Road.

Denbigh Town also won the 2007 Cookson Cup at Farrar Road to complete a 2006–07 League and Cup double, making Tim Dyer an unusual winner of both League and Cup as a manager and as a player.

In the 2015–16 final the team reached the final of the Welsh League Cup, their first appearance in a major final under manager Gareth (Perry) Thomas. The match was played at Maesdu Park, Llandudno where Denbigh went down to defending Welsh Premier League champions and Welsh League Cup holders The New Saints 2–0. On their way to the final they beat 3 top tier opposition.

In season 2017-18 the Club achieved their highest ever league position by being runners up in the Huws Gray Cymru Alliance under the management of Eddie Maurice-Jones. However at the end of that season Maurice-Jones left the club to take over as manager of close rivals Rhyl FC. Many of the players followed Maurice-Jones to Rhyl FC.

The Club appointed Matthew Jones & Dewi Llion Jones as Joint Managers for season 2018–19. They had to rebuild the squad as all of the previous seasons players left for pastures new. Despite a decent first half of the season the second half of the season saw them drop down the league and on the last day of the season they were relegated to the Lock Stock Welsh Alliance League for season 2019–20.

Dewi Llion Jones was appointed Manager during the close season and Owain Roberts joined him as Assistant Manager.

=== Back to the Welsh Alliance ===
At the end of the 2018–19 Cymru Alliance season, the team were relegated back to the Welsh Alliance League for the 2019–20 season. During the 2019–20 season Denbigh reached the Cookson Cup Final but the showpiece was cancelled due to the COVID-19 pandemic.

Denbigh wouldn't play another game following their semi-final win over Nantlle Vale in March 2020 until August 2021 – in a Nathaniel MG Cup loss to Llandudno.

=== Double winners ===
During the 2021–22 Ardal North-West campaign, Denbigh Town finished third in the table, missing out on a play-off spot by a point to Porthmadog. The 2022–23 campaign saw them recruit several new players as Denbigh sought promotion to the JD Cymru North, the second tier in Wales revamped from 2019 onwards. The club battled both Bangor 1876 and Rhyl, pipping both to the title on the final day of the season with a 2–0 win over Rhostyllen.

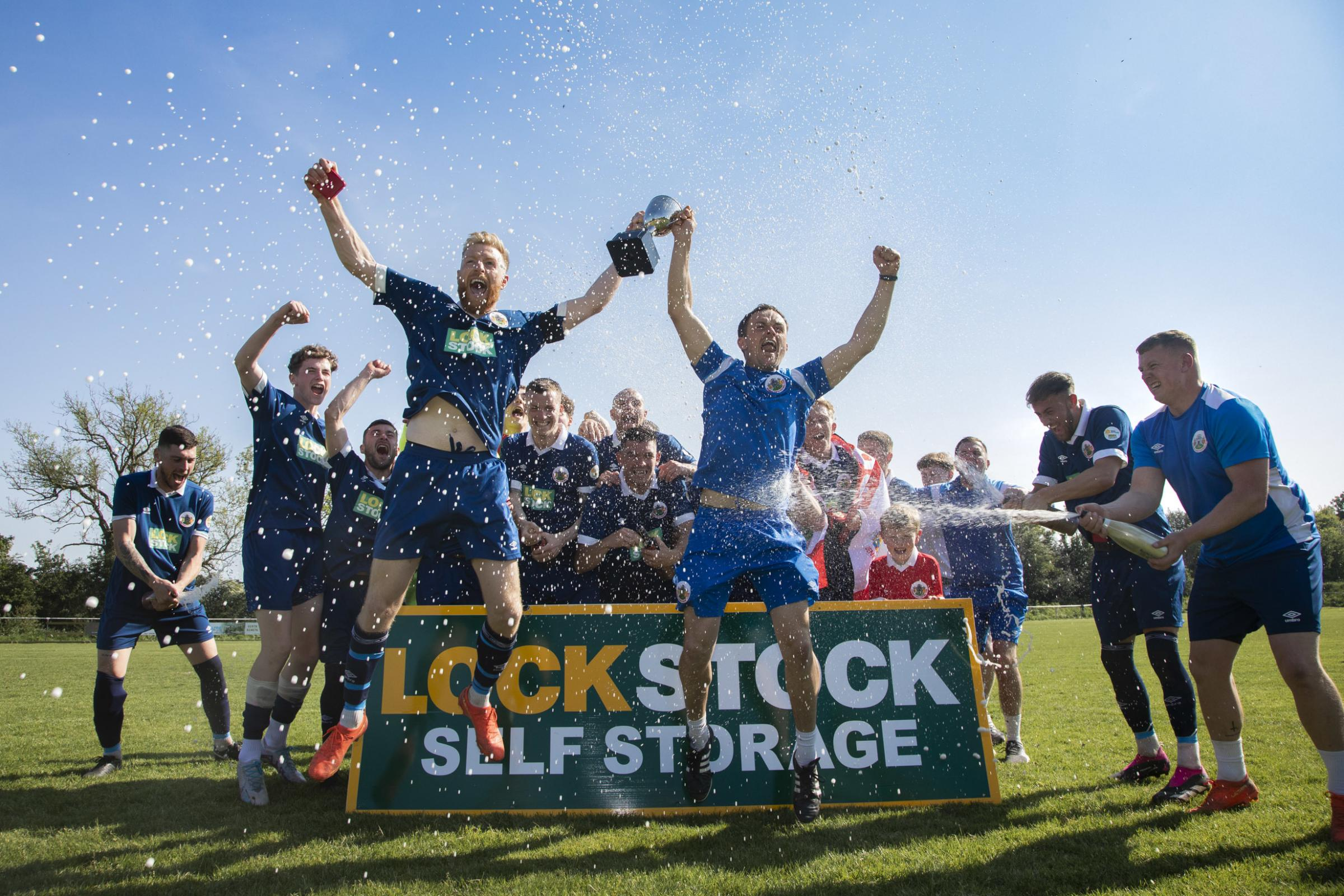
Denbigh Town lift the Lock Stock Ardal North West

In May 2023, a week after winning the title, Denbigh won the Ardal Northern League Cup beating Bow Street 6–1 in Caersws. The club had also reached their first national cup final in 99 years that season, the FAW Amateur Trophy, losing 2–1 to Trethomas Bluebirds in Newtown.

=== Cymru North ===
In Denbigh's first season back in the second tier, the club finished 6th in the Cymru North.

In the summer of 2024 work began on major renovations to Central Park with the demolition of the club's former changing rooms and kitchen, and the construction of a brand new multi-million-pound facility at the ground.

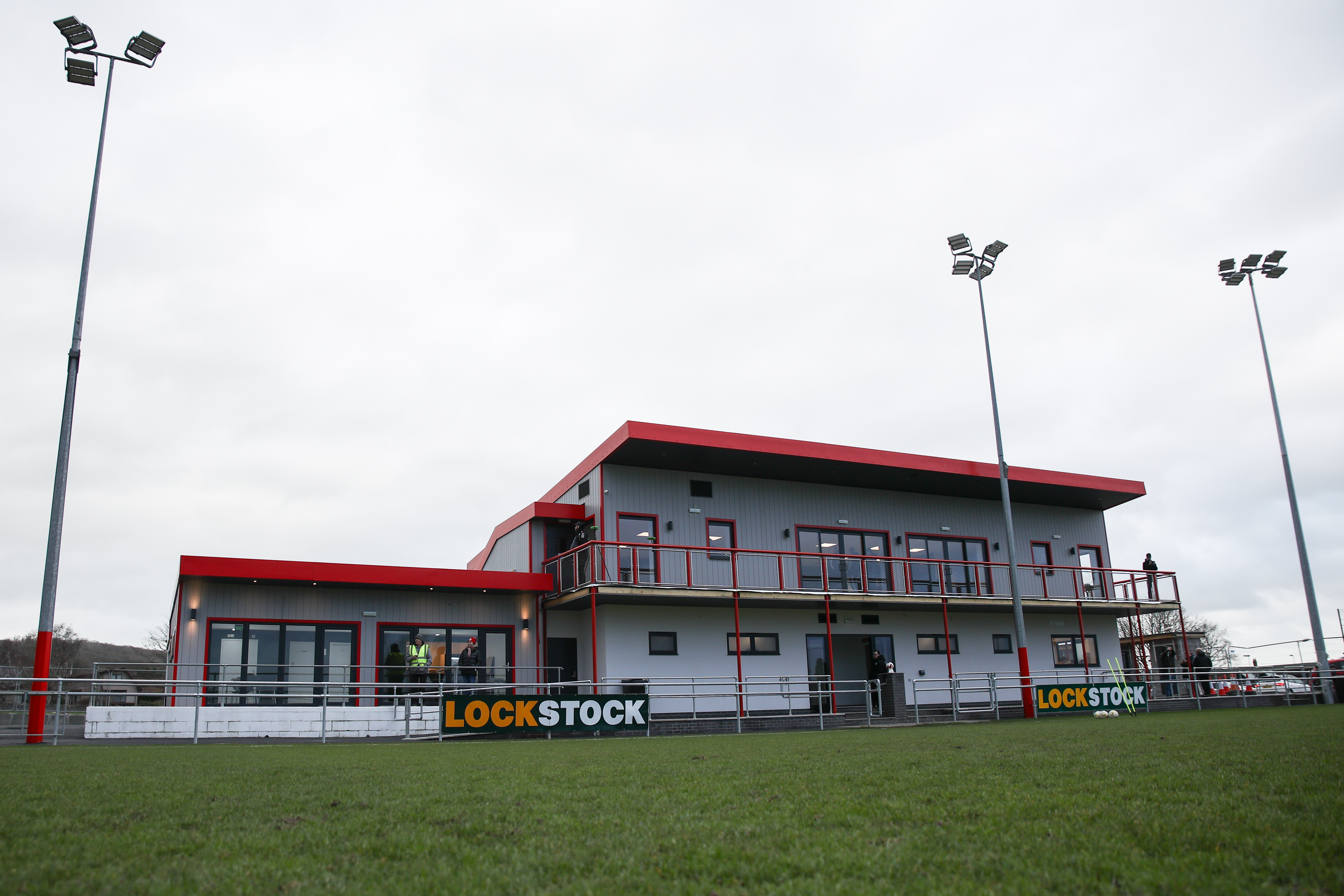
Central Park, Denbigh Town Football Club

The 2024/25 season saw a dip in league performance with a 9th placed finish, but the club had their best ever Welsh Cup campaign by reaching the Quarter-Final of the competition. They played Cymru South side Llanelli Town at Central Park, losing 1-0 in the final minute of stoppage time.

The beginning of the 2025/26 season saw the team play their first three home games of the season at different venues. Their first game was played at Bala Town's Maes Tegid before two more were staged at Colwyn Bay's Llanelian Road. The club returned to Central Park on September 5th 2025 in a 1-1 draw with Buckley Town.

== Current squad ==
As of 12 October 2026

Note: Flags indicate national team as defined under FIFA eligibility rules; some limited exceptions apply. Players may hold more than one non-FIFA nationality.

No.	Pos.	Nation	Player
1	GK	WAL	Oliver Farebrother
13	GK	WAL	Luke Wilmot
2	DF	WAL	Daniel Flanders
4	DF	ENG	Ben Lockley
5	DF	WAL	Max Cooke
6	DF	WAL	Dan Davies
14	DF	WAL	Elliott Orton
20	DF	ENG	Seann McFee
7	MF	WAL	Tom Smith
8	MF	WAL	Sion Jones

No.	Pos.	Nation	Player
11	MF	WAL	Tom Kelly
12	MF	WAL	Osian Davies
17	MF	WAL	Harry Martin
18	MF	WAL	Toby Gallagher-Keenan
19	MF	WAL	Hugh Holland
21	MF	ENG	Luke Johnston
22	MF	WAL	Jacob Duffy
9	FW	WAL	Alfie Vaughan
10	FW	WAL	Nathan Brown
23	FW	WAL	Ffranc Vaughan-Evans
24	FW	WAL	Rhys Lloyd

=== Reserves ===
With first-team squad appearances

Note: Flags indicate national team as defined under FIFA eligibility rules; some limited exceptions apply. Players may hold more than one non-FIFA nationality.

No.	Pos.	Nation	Player
—	MF	WAL	Morgan Fricker
—	MF	ENG	Gabriel Hinchcliffe
—	MF	WAL	Jac Jones

== Club staff ==
=== First team ===
- Manager: Eddie Maurice-Jones
- Coach: Dan Sleet
- Sports Therapist: Tesni Roberts

=== Reserves ===
- Manager: Liam Nash
- Assistant: Sion Jones
- Coach: Jon Slater
- Coach: Ben Welsby
- Coach: Harry Lockley

=== Ladies ===
- Manager: Aled Davies
- Assistant Manager: Carla Rizzi

=== Backroom staff ===
- President: Clwyd Williams
- Chairman: Shon Powell
- Vice-chairman: Richard Blake
- Treasurer: Iwan Jones
- Secretary: Neall Condon
- Assistant Secretary: Stephen Whitfield
- Match-Day Secretary: Gareth Luke Jones
- Media Officer: Ollie Beech

== Honours ==
- FAW Amateur Trophy
  - Winners: 1923–24
  - Finalists: 2022–23
- North Wales Coast Amateur Cup
  - Winners: 1924, 1970, 1972
- Welsh National League Cup
  - Finalists: 1933–34
- Welsh National League (Wrexham Area) Division One
  - Champions: 1972–73, 1973–74, 1974–75, 1975–76
- Clwyd Football League Division One
  - 3rd-place finish: 1991–92 (Promoted)
- Clwyd Football League Premier
  - Runners-Up (Promoted): 1993–94
- Welsh Alliance League
  - Champions: 1995–96, 2006–07, 2013–14 (Undefeated)
- Ardal North-West
  - Champions: 2022–23
- Cookson Challenge Cup
  - Winners: 1995–96, 2005–06, 2006–07
- Alves Cup
  - Winners: 2002–03, 2005–06, 2006–07
- Barrit Cup
  - Winners: 2005–06
- North Wales Coast Challenge Cup
  - Finalists: 2005–06
- Mawddach Cup
  - Winners: 2013–14
- Welsh League Cup
  - Finalists: 2015–16
- Ardal North Cup
  - Winners: 2022–23

== Club records ==
- Highest Recorded Finish: 2nd (Cymru Alliance/North): 2017–18
- Top Goalscorer: Mark Roberts (167)
- Highest Attendance: 1,145 v Ruthin Town (26/12/2023)
- Highest Attendance (non Denbigh Town): 1,725 Spain U19 v Germany U19 (04/07/2026)

Recorded History, goals from 1994 onwards.

== Former players ==
- Gary Roberts – Accrington Stanley, Ipswich Town, Huddersfield Town, Swindon Town, Chesterfield and Portsmouth player.
- Stephen Wright - Liverpool, Coventry City and Sunderland player.
