= Cemaes Bay F.C. =

Association football club in Wales

Coordinates: 53.40682°N 4.45506°W

Cemaes Bay
- Full name: Cemaes Bay Football Club
- Nickname: Bay
- Founded: 1976
- Ground: School Lane, Cemaes Bay
- Capacity: 100
- Chairman: T. V. Hughes
- Manager: Darren Thomas
- League: North Wales Coast West Premier Division
- 2025–26: North Wales Coast West Premier Division, 9th of 15
Home colours	Away colours

Cemaes Bay Football Club (Welsh: Clwb Pêl-droed Bae Cemaes) is a football team playing in the North Wales Coast West Premier Division. Between 1995 and 1998 the club played in the League of Wales.

== History ==
A football team is recorded in Cemaes Bay as far back as 1870 and a team of that name played in the Anglesey League between the years 1948 and 1955.

The current Cemaes Bay Football Club was not formed until 1976 and joined the Anglesey League for the 1976–77 season.

The club used the facilities at the nearby Wylfa Nuclear Power Station, playing briefly at a ground next to the Gadlys Hotel in 1980, then returning to Wylfa. The club's present School Lane ground was developed in time for the club to enter the Anglesey League and the League of Wales in 1995. At the end of the 1990/91 season, they were elected to the Welsh Alliance, the former Welsh League (North).

In the 1991–92 season Cemaes Bay won the Cookson Cup, beating Llangefni Town 1–0. They retained the Cup in 1992–93, beating Bangor City's reserve side 5–0. Cemaes Bay also won the Welsh Alliance championship title and gained another promotion to the Cymru Alliance. In 1994–95 a run of 25 league matches without defeat made Cemaes Bay the Cymru Alliance league winners and they were promoted to the League of Wales.

At the end of 1997 the club's main financial backer resigned and they also lost several key players. Cemaes Ynys Môn struggled for the remainder of the 1997–98 season and were relegated to the Cymru Alliance. They regularly challenged at the top of the table for the next four seasons, but in 2004–05 were relegated to the Welsh Alliance and in 2005–06 dropped to the Gwynedd League. In March 2018 Cemaes Bay temporarily became inactive having resigned from the Welsh Alliance League during the season before rejoining the Anglesey League in time for the 2018–19 season.

The club were chosen to host several games during the 2019 Inter Games Football Tournament.

== Current squad ==
Note: Flags indicate national team as defined under FIFA eligibility rules; some limited exceptions apply. Players may hold more than one non-FIFA nationality.

No.	Pos.	Nation	Player
—	GK	WAL	Dan Jones
—	DF	WAL	Dylan Jones
—	DF	WAL	Shane Pell
—	DF	ENG	Sam Carter
—	DF	WAL	Rhys Lloyd
—	DF	WAL	Nick Owen
—	DF	WAL	Sion Rowlands
—	MF	WAL	Sam Aspinall
—	MF	WAL	Daniel Bull
—	MF	WAL	Ashley Edwards
—	MF	WAL	Ryan Folksman

No.	Pos.	Nation	Player
—	MF	WAL	Liam Griffiths
—	MF	WAL	Thomas Higgott
—	MF	WAL	Mathew O'Hara
—	MF	WAL	Luke McKittrick
—	MF	WAL	Huw Torr
—	MF	WAL	Keenan Downey
—	MF	WAL	Chris Hughes
—	MF	WAL	Tam Morton
—	FW	WAL	Oliver Hall
—	FW	WAL	Steven Whittaker (captain)

== Honours ==
- Cymru Alliance – Champions (1): 1994–95
- Welsh Alliance League – Champions (1): 1992–93
- Cookson Cup – Winners (2): 1991–92, 1992–93
- Elias Cup - Winners - 2013–14
- Megan Cup - Winners - 2014–15
- Dargie Cup - Winners 2014–15
- Anglesey League - Winners - 2019–20
- NWCFA Junior Cup – Winners (1): 2021–22
