= Holyhead Hotspur F.C. =

Association football club in Wales

Coordinates: 53.295010°N 4.632229°W

Holyhead Hotspur
- Full name: Holyhead Hotspur Football Club
- Nickname: The Bees
- Short name: Holyhead
- Founded: 1990; 36 years ago
- Ground: The New Oval, Holyhead
- Chairman: Mike Taylor
- Manager: Darren Garmey
- League: Cymru North
- 2025–26: Cymru North, 11th of 16
Home colours	Away colours

Holyhead Hotspur Football Club (Welsh: Clwb Pêl-droed Hotspur Caergybi) is a football club based in Holyhead, Anglesey. They play in the Cymru North.

The team's home strip is vertical blue and white striped shirts, blue shorts and horizontal blue and white striped socks. The away strip is all burgundy.

Holyhead Hotspur play at the New Oval ground opposite the leisure centre in Holyhead. The new stadium was opened in a ceremony on 27 July 2007 with a friendly match against a Wolverhampton Wanderers XI.

== Club history ==
Holyhead Hotspur was formed in 1990, initially playing in the Anglesey League. A group of local football lads who were playing for another local team decided to start their own team with the help of Ken Chambers and Gary 'scouse' Williams. To choose a team name, they each put their suggestion in a hat and the name HOTSPUR was drawn out, so Holyhead Hotspur was born.

In 1996, following the success of Holyhead Hotspur in the Anglesey League and the Gwynedd League, the club amalgamated with the other four clubs representing Holyhead, to form Holyhead Hotspur and Holyhead Hotspur Reserves.

Holyhead Hotspur were promoted to the Cymru Alliance league for the 1998–99 season after winning the Welsh Alliance League in the 1997–98 season. At the same time, Holyhead Hotspur Reserves also saw promotion to the Gwynedd League.

In summer 1997, local junior football club Holyhead Peibio Youth amalgamated with Holyhead Hotspur and formed the club's junior branch. Now known as Holyhead Hotspur Peibio Youth, the juniors are represented at Under 7, Under 9, Under 11, Under 12, Under 14, Under 16 and Under 18 age groups. Holyhead Hotspur Peibio Youth was the first organisation in the whole of Wales to receive the Welsh Football Trust's Fun Football Accreditation, allowing the club to host regular soccer school activities as well as football in the community programme, involving a newly-formed ladies team (Cybi Ladies) and a learning difficulties team (Clwb Cybi). In 2009 they were one of only four clubs on Anglesey to be awarded silver accreditation by McDonald's and the Football Association of Wales. Silver accreditation was retained for the 2010–11 season.

In summer 2011, girls' teams were reintroduced into the club. Teams at under 10 and under 12 were affiliated to the North Wales Girls League.

In 2018, Darren Garmey and Nick Dumbarton became Manager and Assistant Manager, and Ben Williams became chairman. The reserve side was taken over by Mike Kelly, Tom Scott, Martyn Mcclymont and John Jones, playing in the Anglesey league. In the 2018-19 season, Holyhead Hotspur were relegated from the Cymru Alliance to the Welsh Alliance League after being in the Cymru Alliance for six years.

In 2024, £818 was raised for the club in honour of Mr Martin Campbell, a former coach to many past and present players. He had a significant influence on many players for the club throughout the years.

== Stadium ==
The club play at the New Stadium, into which they moved in 2007. The old ground still stands next to the new one, and is in use for some local games. The ground was chosen to host several games, including the final, of the 2019 Inter Games Football Tournament.

== Management team ==
It was announced on 13 September 2009 that Campbell Harrison was to step down as manager after three seasons in charge. On 16 September 2009, Mark Williams, who was assistant manager to Campbell, was offered the post of manager. He duly accepted, and promoted reserve team boss Emlyn Manley-Williams to be his assistant manager on 8 October 2009. Emlyn was appointed first team manager at the start of the 2011 season, which heralded unprecedented success in his first season. Emlyn and his backroom staff of Neil Bell and Mark Jat tendered their resignations in May 2013. On 6 June 2013, Campbell Harrison was re-appointed first team manager. He gave up the reins in 2018, with Darren Garmey and Nick Dumbarton replacing him.

- Manager: Darren Garmey
- Assistant managers: Nick Dumbarton

== Current squad ==
Note: Flags indicate national team as defined under FIFA eligibility rules; some limited exceptions apply. Players may hold more than one non-FIFA nationality.

No.	Pos.	Nation	Player
-	GK	WAL	Ben Heald
-	GK	WAL	Guto Hughes
-	DF	WAL	Nathan Williams
-	DF	WAL	Corey Jones
-	DF	WAL	Tomos Owen
-	DF	WAL	Cai Roberts (on loan from Llandudno)
-	DF	SCO	Jamie Pick
-	DF	WAL	Cai Perry
-	DF	WAL	Kyle Murphy
-	DF	WAL	Jake Roberts
-	DF	WAL	James Phillips
-	DF	WAL	Callum Graves
-	MF	ENG	Dylan Walton-Pratt
-	MF	WAL	Jack Walsh
-	MF	WAL	Craig Whelan

No.	Pos.	Nation	Player
-	MF	WAL	Ifan Emlyn
-	MF	WAL	Matthew Lewis
-	MF	WAL	Mike Kelly
-	MF	WAL	Huw Morris
-	MF	WAL	Luca Meek
-	MF	WAL	Deian Perry
-	MF	WAL	Casey Gregg
-	FW	WAL	Tomi Llywelyn
-	FW	WAL	Jamie Jones
-	FW	WAL	Kane Roberts
-	FW	WAL	Cory Williams
-	FW	WAL	Kenleigh Owen
-	FW	WAL	Connor Owen
-	FW	WAL	Cameron Buckley
