= Ruthin Town F.C. =

Association football club in Wales

Coordinates: 53.116483°N 3.315567°W

Ruthin Town
- Full name: Ruthin Town Football Club
- Nickname: The Town
- Founded: 1880; 146 years ago
- Ground: Memorial Playing Fields; Ruthin
- Capacity: 2,000
- Chairman: vacant
- Manager: Colin Caton
- League: Cymru North
- 2025–26: Cymru North, 16th of 16
Home colours	Away colours

Ruthin Town Football Club is a Welsh football club, based at the Memorial Playing Fields in Ruthin, Denbighshire. Football in Ruthin dates back to 1878 when a new club was formed. In 1880 Ruthin reached the final of the Welsh Cup only to lose 2–1 to Druids. However, the club in its present form dates back to 1949 when they joined the newly re-organised Welsh National League (Wrexham Area) as Ruthin British Legion. They currently play in the Cymru North.

== History ==
Ruthin Town joined division two coming runners up in their first year and gaining promotion to division 1. The following year they were runners up in the top division. The British Legion element of the name was dropped in 1953 and Ruthin Town FC was born. In 1958 the club introduced a reserve team that entered the WNL (Wrexham Area) Division 3. The first team won the first division in 1963–64 and the North Wales Challenge Cup in 1967. The 1972–73 season was an exciting one for the Vale of Clwyd as both Ruthin and Denbigh were contesting the first division title. Denbigh won on goal difference with both teams having won 18, drawn 7 and lost 3. Ruthin, however, won the North Wales Challenge Cup for the second time. In 1977–78 the first team was relegated from the first division which meant the reserves were also demoted from the second division. The following year the club introduced a third team which played in the Clwyd league. That team was later called the Colts as it joined the WNL (Wrexham Area) division 4 in 1980. The club runs three senior teams to this day. 1979–80 was a big season for the club as both the first team and reserves were promoted back to the first and second divisions both as champions of their respective leagues. A decade of stability ensued with the three senior teams establishing themselves in their respective leagues with their youth system being set up in 1986. This youth system was to be the making of the club providing a consistent source of players for the senior teams. Most of the current first-team squad are products of that very youth system. The club currently runs 6 youth teams from under 12's to under 16's. 1991–92 the first team were runners up to Wrexham Reserves under Glyn Williams and were promoted to the Cymru Alliance. They also won the League Cup that year. Ruthin were ever-present in the Cymru Alliance for a further 21 years before being relegated in 2013. They won the WNL Premier League Cup in 2014 and matched their 1992 result in 2016 by gaining promotion back to the Huws Gray Alliance and winning the Premier League Cup for the second time in three years. The club won the NEWFA Cup 2018 beating Holywell in the final. Their best HGA league position to date is third place 2003–04 under Tim Dyer. As the second tier of Welsh Football comes under the wing of the FAW in 2019 Ruthin have been one of the longest-serving clubs in the Huws Gray Alliance along with Buckley Town. Ruthin serving 23 years and Buckley doing one better at 24.

On 27 August 2021 Ruthin played hosts to Guilsfield F C, kick off 7.45pm, for their first game under newly installed floodlights and with refurbished player facilities.

In March 2024 Manager Phil Hudson left the club and assistant Dave Evans was asked to stand in until the end of the season. In May 2024 the committee appointed Dave Evans as manager.

In November 2025 Colin Caton joined the club as manager. He had previously managed Bala Town for 22 years before he left Bala in June.

== Honours ==
Information sourced includes from FCHD entries for Ruthin Town, Ruthin Town reserves and Ruthin Town Colts.

- North Wales Amateur Cup – Winners: 1967, 1973
- North East Wales FA Challenge Cup
  - Winners: 2017–18, 2021–22
- Welsh National League (Wrexham Area)
  - Premier Division – Runners-up: 1991–92, 1999–2000 (reserves), 2015–16
  - First Division – Runners-up: 2001–02 (Colts)
  - Second Division – Champions: 1979–80
  - Second Division – Runners-up: 1992–93 (Colts)
  - Third Division – Champions: 1978–79
  - Third Division – Runners-up: 1989–90 (Colts)
  - Premier Division Cup – Winners: 1991–92, 2013–14, 2015–16
  - League Cup – Winners: 1979–80

== International players ==
Six Ruthin players appeared for Wales between 1880 and 1895:

- Uriah Goodwin – 1 cap
- Richard Jarrett – 2 caps
- Arthur Lloyd – 2 caps
- William Pierce Owen – 12 caps
- Walter Hugh Roberts – 5 caps (out of 6)

== Players ==
As of 19 September 2026

Note: Flags indicate national team as defined under FIFA eligibility rules; some limited exceptions apply. Players may hold more than one non-FIFA nationality.

No.	Pos.	Nation	Player
1	GK	WAL	Daniel Goldston
2	DF	WAL	Dan Cox
3	DF	ENG	Harry Lockley
4	DF	WAL	James Smith
5	DF	WAL	Meirion Pughe
6	DF	WAL	Ethan Davies
7	MF	WAL	Nathan Lloyd (on loan from Llandudno)
8	MF	WAL	Jack Waterhouse
9	FW	ENG	Dave Forbes
11	FW	WAL	Noah Sumner
12	MF	WAL	Mitchell Williams

No.	Pos.	Nation	Player
13	GK	WAL	Harley Salibury-Williams
14	DF	WAL	Tom Weyman
15	MF	WAL	Thomas Mann
16	FW	BAN	Abir Kabir
17	MF	SWE	Prince Junior Yelegon
18	MF	WAL	Arthur Hancock
19	DF	WAL	Luka Graham
20	MF	ENG	Luke Edwards
—	MF	WAL	Alex Boss (on loan from Llandudno)
—			Ryan Butters
—	MF	WAL	Sam Jones
