= 2018–19 Cymru Alliance =

Motivated writings

Cymru Alliance
- Season: 2018–19
- Dates: 10 August 2018 – 27 April 2019
- Champions: Airbus UK Broughton
- Relegated: Denbigh Town; Holyhead Hotspur; Holywell Town
- Matches played: 240
- Goals scored: 763 (3.18 per match)
- Biggest home win: Bangor City 9–0 Llanrhaeadr (3 November 2018)
- Biggest away win: Llanrhaeadr 0–6 Gresford Athletic (28 September 2018)
- All statistics correct as of 20 August 2019.

The 2018–19 Cymru Alliance, known as the Huws Gray Cymru Alliance for sponsorship reasons, was the 29th and final season of the Cymru Alliance, which is in the second level of the Welsh football pyramid.

The league consisted of sixteen teams with the champions promoted to the Welsh Premier League and the bottom team relegated to either the Mid Wales Football League, the Welsh Alliance League or the Welsh National League (Wrexham Area), dependent on the location of that team.

The season began on 10 August 2018 and concluded on 27 April 2019.

== Teams ==
Caernarfon Town were champions in the previous season and were promoted to the Welsh Premier League. They were replaced by Prestatyn Town who were relegated from the Welsh Premier League and Bangor City who were demoted from the Welsh Premier League.

The bottom three teams from the previous season, Caersws, Llandudno Junction and Queens Park were relegated to the Mid Wales Football League, the Welsh Alliance League and the Welsh National League (Wrexham Area), respectively.

Welsh National League (Wrexham Area) champions, Buckley Town, Welsh Alliance League champions, Conwy Borough and Mid Wales Football League champions, Llanrhaeadr were promoted to the Cymru Alliance.

Locations of the 2018–19 Cymru Alliance teams

=== Grounds and locations ===
Team	Location	Ground
Airbus UK Broughton	Broughton	The Airfield
Bangor City	Bangor	Nantporth
Buckley Town	Buckley	Globe Way
Conwy Borough	Conwy	Y Morfa Stadium
Denbigh Town	Denbigh	Central Park
Flint Town United	Flint	Cae-y-Castell
Gresford Athletic	Gresford	Clappers Lane
Guilsfield	Guilsfield	Guilsfield Community Centre
Holyhead Hotspur	Holyhead	The New Oval
Holywell Town	Holywell	Halkyn Road
Llanrhaeadr	Llanrhaeadr-ym-Mochnant	The Recreation Field
Penrhyncoch	Penrhyn-coch	Cae Baker
Porthmadog	Porthmadog	Y Traeth
Prestatyn Town	Prestatyn	Bastion Road
Rhyl	Rhyl	Belle Vue
Ruthin Town	Ruthin	Memorial Playing Fields

== League table ==
Pos	Team	Pld	W	D	L	GF	GA	GD	Pts	Promotion or relegation
1	Airbus UK Broughton (C, P)	30	24	4	2	75	20	+55	76	Promotion to Welsh Premier League
2	Flint Town United	30	17	7	6	52	31	+21	58	
3	Porthmadog	30	17	6	7	60	32	+28	57	
4	Bangor City	30	16	3	11	68	48	+20	51	
5	Rhyl	30	16	3	11	55	44	+11	51	
6	Guilsfield	30	13	6	11	43	45	−2	45	
7	Ruthin Town	30	13	4	13	46	47	−1	43	
8	Buckley Town	30	12	6	12	51	50	+1	42	
9	Prestatyn Town	30	11	6	13	52	49	+3	39	
10	Gresford Athletic	30	10	9	11	42	46	−4	39	
11	Conwy Borough	30	9	9	12	46	42	+4	36	
12	Llanrhaeadr	30	10	2	18	34	71	−37	32	
13	Penrhyncoch	30	7	9	14	35	44	−9	30	
14	Holywell Town (R)	30	8	6	16	38	58	−20	30	Relegation to Welsh National League (Wrexham Area)
15	Denbigh Town (R)	30	9	2	19	37	65	−28	29	Relegation to Welsh Alliance League
16	Holyhead Hotspur (R)	30	5	4	21	29	71	−42	19	Relegation to Welsh Alliance League

Source: Cymru Alliance
Rules for classification: 1) Points; 2) Goal difference; 3) Goals scored; 4) Matches won; 5) Play-off.
(C) Champions; (P) Promoted; (R) Relegated

== Results ==
Home \ Away	AIR	BAN	BUC	CON	DEN	FTU	GRE	GUI	HHD	HWL	LLR	PRC	POR	PRE	RHL	RUT
Airbus UK Broughton	—	3–2	3–2	1–0	2–0	3–0	5–0	5–0	2–0	4–0	6–2	2–0	1–1	1–2	1–0	2–1
Bangor City	1–6	—	5–1	1–0	5–0	2–1	1–2	0–2	1–1	5–2	9–0	1–3	1–2	3–0	4–3	0–4
Buckley Town	1–2	0–2	—	1–2	0–2	2–1	3–0	1–2	2–0	4–0	1–2	1–1	2–1	3–2	2–5	1–1
Conwy Borough	1–1	0–1	2–2	—	4–1	0–1	1–2	1–2	1–0	3–1	3–1	2–2	2–2	1–1	2–0	1–1
Denbigh Town	2–3	3–2	0–1	1–3	—	1–3	1–3	3–4	3–1	1–3	3–1	1–1	0–3	2–1	0–2	3–0
Flint Town United	1–0	0–0	2–0	1–1	1–1	—	1–0	2–0	5–2	2–2	2–1	2–1	1–1	2–1	2–0	7–1
Gresford Athletic	0–0	0–3	3–3	4–2	2–0	0–1	—	2–2	5–1	1–1	1–1	1–1	0–1	2–1	1–1	0–0
Guilsfield	1–1	1–3	1–3	1–2	0–1	3–0	1–0	—	1–0	0–0	5–0	1–1	0–2	3–2	0–0	2–0
Holyhead Hotspur	0–4	1–4	3–3	1–1	2–1	1–4	1–2	1–4	—	0–2	2–3	1–3	0–1	2–1	3–2	1–2
Holywell Town	0–3	2–1	0–2	1–1	1–3	2–1	1–0	2–2	3–0	—	2–1	2–3	1–2	0–1	2–3	0–3
Llanrhaeadr	1–3	2–2	2–0	2–1	1–0	0–1	0–6	0–2	0–1	1–3	—	2–1	0–2	1–2	1–0	3–2
Penrhyncoch	0–2	0–2	0–1	3–2	1–2	1–0	3–1	3–0	0–0	3–3	0–1	—	0–2	0–0	0–1	0–1
Porthmadog	1–2	0–2	3–3	1–0	6–0	2–2	6–0	0–2	2–0	4–1	2–0	4–2	—	2–0	1–3	2–0
Prestatyn Town	0–2	6–2	0–4	3–0	2–1	2–3	1–1	4–0	2–0	1–0	5–2	1–1	3–3	—	1–1	2–3
Rhyl	0–3	2–1	3–1	0–5	5–0	0–2	1–3	4–1	5–0	1–0	3–1	3–1	2–1	0–3	—	2–0
Ruthin Town	1–2	1–2	0–1	3–2	2–1	1–1	2–0	2–0	2–4	2–1	1–2	2–0	2–0	4–2	2–3	—

Source: Cymru Alliance - Results Grid
Legend: Blue = home team win; Yellow = draw; Red = away team win.
