= 2019–20 Cymru North =

Cymru North
- Season: 2019–20
- Dates: 16 August 2019 – 7 March 2020
- Champions: Prestatyn Town
- Promoted: Flint Town United
- Relegated: Porthmadog, Corwen, Llanfair United
- Matches: 200
- Goals: 671 (3.36 per match)
- Top goalscorer: Corrig McGonigle Conwy Borough (24 goals)
- Biggest home win: Flint Town United 7–0 Llangefni Town (21 September 2019); Prestatyn Town 7–0 Bangor City (27 September 2019); Flint Town United 7–0 Ruthin Town (15 October 2019); Prestatyn Town 7–0 Llanfair United (16 November 2019)
- Biggest away win: Conwy Borough 0–7 Prestatyn Town (11 September 2019)
- Highest scoring: Flint Town United 5–3 Conwy Borough (27 August 2019); Corwen 2–6 Gresford Athletic (28 September 2019); Colwyn Bay 4–4 Conwy Borough (17 December 2019); Rhyl 3–5 Llanrhaeadr-ym-Mochnant (1 January 2020); Rhyl 7–1 Llanfair United (18 January 2020); Gresford Athletic 7–1 Porthmadog (1 February 2020)
- All statistics correct as of 7 March 2020.

The 2019–20 Cymru North was the inaugural season of the Cymru North, which is in the second level of the Welsh football pyramid. The season had been scheduled to finish on 25 April but due to the COVID-19 pandemic no games were played after 7 March. In May 2020 the Cymru North was officially ended after consultation between the Football Association of Wales and the clubs. Prestatyn Town were confirmed as champions but because they failed to gain a Tier 1 licence, runners-up Flint Town United were promoted to the Cymru Premier. Porthmadog, Corwen and Llanfair United were relegated.

The league consisted of seventeen teams with the champions promoted to the Cymru Premier and the bottom four teams relegated to a regional division of FAW League One.

The season commenced on 16 August 2019 and had been scheduled to conclude on 25 April 2020.

== Effects of the COVID-19 pandemic ==
On 13 March 2020, all games were suspended due to the COVID-19 pandemic and no further games were played in the campaign. On 19 May 2020, the league was cancelled. Prestatyn Town were declared the champions.

== Teams ==
The inaugural season consisted of twelve teams from the now defunct Cymru Alliance, which are Bangor City, Buckley Town, Conwy Borough, Flint Town United, Gresford Athletic, Guilsfield, Llanrhaeadr-ym-Mochnant, Penrhyncoch, Porthmadog, Prestatyn Town, Rhyl and Ruthin Town.

Joining them were Llandudno who were relegated from Cymru Premier, Mid Wales Football League champions, Llanfair United, Welsh Alliance League champions, Llangefni Town and Welsh National League (Wrexham Area) runners-up, Corwen.

In addition and after a 35-year absence, Colwyn Bay rejoined the Welsh football league and were placed in the Cymru North. From English Northern Premier League Division One West.

On 5 August 2019 Bangor City were suspended from playing competitive matches pending an arbitration hearing on 16 August following allegations that they fielded an ineligible player the previous season. On 16 August 2019, Bangor City won their appeal against the FAW in Birmingham and were reinstated the 21 points that were originally deducted from them in the 2018–19 Cymru Alliance season and were cleared to start the season in Cymru North.

Locations of teams in the 2019–20 Cymru North

=== Grounds and locations ===
Team	Location	Ground
Bangor City	Bangor	The EUROGOLD Stadium
Buckley Town	Buckley	Globe Way
Colwyn Bay	Old Colwyn	4 Crosses Construction Arena
Conwy Borough	Conwy	Y Morfa Stadium
Corwen	Corwen	War Memorial Ground
Flint Town United	Flint	Cae-y-Castell
Gresford Athletic	Gresford	Clappers Lane
Guilsfield	Guilsfield	Guilsfield Community Centre
Llandudno	Llandudno	The Giant Hospitality Stadium
Llanfair United	Llanfair Caereinion	Mount Field
Llangefni Town	Llangefni	Bob Parry Field
Llanrhaeadr-ym-Mochnant	Llanrhaeadr-ym-Mochnant	The Recreation Field
Penrhyncoch	Penrhyn-coch	Cae Baker
Porthmadog	Porthmadog	Y Traeth
Prestatyn Town	Prestatyn	Bastion Road
Rhyl	Rhyl	Belle Vue
Ruthin Town	Ruthin	Memorial Playing Fields

== League table ==
The Cymru North table as it stood after the league was halted in early March, 2020 due to the COVID-19 pandemic.

Pos	Team	Pld	W	D	L	GF	GA	GD	Pts	Promotion or relegation
1	Prestatyn Town	26	22	2	2	84	19	+65	68	
2	Flint Town United	24	16	4	4	61	24	+37	52	Promoted to the Cymru Premier
3	Colwyn Bay	25	15	5	5	47	30	+17	50	
4	Guilsfield	22	14	4	4	47	27	+20	46	
5	Bangor City	23	11	7	5	29	26	+3	40	
6	Llanrhaeadr-ym-Mochnant	23	11	3	9	41	38	+3	36	
7	Conwy Borough	24	10	6	8	45	45	0	36	
8	Penrhyncoch	25	11	3	11	31	35	−4	36	
9	Rhyl	25	11	2	12	45	38	+7	35	
10	Llandudno	23	8	4	11	35	38	−3	28	
11	Gresford Athletic	24	8	5	11	37	38	−1	29	
12	Ruthin Town	25	7	7	11	32	40	−8	28	
13	Buckley Town	21	7	3	11	25	45	−20	24	
14	Llangefni Town	26	5	7	14	23	49	−26	22	
15	Porthmadog	24	4	6	14	28	47	−19	18	Relegated to FAW League One
16	Corwen	23	3	5	15	26	55	−29	14	Relegated to FAW League One
17	Llanfair United	23	2	3	18	26	68	−42	9	Relegated to FAW League One

Updated to match(es) played on 7 March 2020. Source: Cymru North
Rules for classification: 1) Points; 2) Goal difference; 3) Goals scored; 4) Matches won; 5) Play-off.

== Positions by round ==
The table lists the positions of teams after completion of each round.

Team ╲ Round	1	2	3	4	5	6	7	8	9	10	11	12	13	14	15	16	17	18	19	20	21	22	23	24	25	26	27	28	29	30	31	32
Prestatyn Town	6	1	1	1	1	1	1	1	1	1	1	1	1	1	1	1	1	1	1	1	1	1	1	1	1	1						
Flint Town United	12	10	2	2	2	2	3	2	3	5	3	2	2	2	2	2	2	2	2	2	2	2	2	2								
Colwyn Bay	11	14	13	11	12	14	11	10	10	8	8	3	3	3	4	4	5	3	3	3	5	5	3	3								
Guilsfield	14	16	15	10	7	9	10	8	7	7	7	8	6	6	5	5	6	7	7	6	3	3	4	4								
Bangor City	9	13	8	7	8	8	7	9	11	9	9	9	10	10	10	10	8	8	8	8	8	8	7	5								
Llanrhaeadr-ym-Mochnant	13	8	3	3	3	3	4	3	2	4	5	7	8	8	7	6	3	4	4	4	4	4	5	6								
Conwy Borough	2	3	10	6	4	5	5	5	4	2	4	6	4	5	6	7	7	6	6	5	6	6	8	7								
Penrhyncoch	4	9	5	8	9	7	6	6	5	6	6	5	7	7	8	8	9	9	9	9	9	9	9	8								
Rhyl	5	2	6	4	6	4	2	4	6	3	2	4	5	4	3	3	4	5	5	7	7	7	6	9								
Llandudno	1	11	4	9	10	13	8	7	9	11	11	11	9	9	9	9	10	11	10	11	11	11	10	10								
Gresford Athletic	16	5	12	13	14	10	13	13	12	12	12	12	12	12	12	13	13	14	14	13	13	12	11	11								
Ruthin Town	8	4	7	5	5	6	9	11	8	10	10	10	11	11	11	11	11	10	11	10	10	10	12	12								
Buckley Town	10	6	11	14	13	11	12	12	13	13	13	13	13	13	13	12	12	13	13	14	15	14	14	13								
Llangefni Town	3	7	9	12	11	12	14	14	14	14	14	14	14	14	14	14	14	12	12	12	12	13	13	14								
Porthmadog	17	15	16	16	17	16	17	17	17	15	15	15	15	15	15	15	15	15	15	15	14	15	15	15	REL							
Corwen	15	17	17	17	16	17	16	15	16	17	17	16	16	16	16	16	16	16	16	16	16	16	16	16	REL							
Llanfair United	7	12	14	15	15	15	15	16	15	16	16	17	17	17	17	17	17	17	17	17	17	17	17	17	17	17	REL	REL				

Promotion to Cymru Premier
Relegation to FAW League One

Updated to match(es) played on 18 February 2020. Source: Cymru North

== Results ==
Home \ Away	BAN	BUC	COL	CON	COR	FTU	GRE	GUI	LND	LFU	LGT	LYM	PRC	POR	PRE	RHL	RUT
Bangor City	—	3–1	2–3	2–0		1–1	1–1	0–2	2–3	1–0	3–1	3–2		1–0			1–0
Buckley Town		—				0–3	1–1		2–1	2–1	0–3	2–4	1–0	3–2	0–5		
Colwyn Bay	1–1		—	4–4	2–0	0–1	3–1	4–1	2–0	4–2	0–0	1–1	2–1	1–2	1–2		2–1
Conwy Borough	0–0	2–3		—	1–3	2–2		1–2	3–3		4–0		3–0	2–2	0–7	2–1	1–1
Corwen	1–1	1–1	0–2		—		2–6		2–2	3–0	1–2	1–2	1–3		1–6		0–2
Flint Town United	1–0	3–0	1–2	5–3	3–1	—					7–0		3–1	3–1	2–3	1–2	7–0
Gresford Athletic				1–2		0–1	—	0–2		2–0	2–2	1–1	2–1	7–1	0–3	1–3	1–0
Guilsfield				4–2	3–3	1–3	1–0	—	3–2	6–1		0–2	3–1	2–0	1–1	4–3	1–1
Llandudno	0–2	0–1	2–3	0–1	3–1	0–0	1–4		—	1–2			4–0	4–1	1–4	2–0	1–0
Llanfair United			2–3	1–3	2–2		0–3	0–3	2–2	—		2–3	0–1	1–3		2–3	1–1
Llangefni Town	0–1	2–2	1–1	1–2		0–5	2–0	0–1	2–0	1–3	—	0–3		1–1	0–3	0–0	0–1
Llanrhaeadr-ym-Mochnant		1–2	0–1	1–2	1–0	2–3	1–0	0–3				—	1–2	4–2		2–1	2–2
Penrhyncoch	0–0	2–1	2–0		1–0	1–0	3–0	1–3		3–1	2–0	0–2	—		3–2	2–1	1–2
Porthmadog	0–1	2–0		0–2	1–2	2–2			0–1		2–2		0–0	—	1–2	0–1	2–0
Prestatyn Town	7–0	2–1	3–1	1–0	4–1		5–1	1–0		7–0	2–0	5–0		2–2	—	1–0	
Rhyl	1–2	4–1	0–3		4–0	0–1		1–2	0–1	7–1	2–1	3–5	0–0		2–1	—	4–2
Ruthin Town	1–1	3–1	0–1	1–3	3–0		1–1	1–1		4–1			3–1		1–4	1–2	—

Updated to match(es) played on 7 March 2020. Source: Cymru North
Legend: Blue = home team win; Yellow = draw; Red = away team win.

=== Top scorers ===
Rank	Player	Club	Goals
1	Corrig McGonigle	Conwy Borough	24
2	Mark Cadwallader	Flint Town United	23
3	Rob Hughes	Prestatyn Town	17

=== Final League table ===
On 19 May 2020, the league was cancelled due to the COVID-19 pandemic and an unweighted points per game method was applied to determine the final standings. The Football Association of Wales said a decision on promotion and relegation between leagues would be made in due course.

Prestatyn Town were refused a Tier One licence in April 2020 to allow them to compete in the Cymru Premier for season 2020-21 and their subsequent appeal was unsuccessful. Flint Town United were awarded Tier 1 Licence following a successful appeal.

Flint's promotion to the Cymru Premier was confirmed by the FAW on 16 June 2020. It was also confirmed that Porthmadog, Corwen and Llanfair United would be relegated to Tier 3.

Rhyl entered administration in April 2020 after failing to find a £175,000 investment, with the club's directors cited the financial impact of the COVID-19 pandemic as a reason for entering administration and the club's results were expunged.

Pos	Team	Pld	W	D	L	GF	GA	GD	Pts	PPG	Promotion or relegation
1	Prestatyn Town (C)	24	21	2	1	84	18	+66	65	2.71	
2	Flint Town United (P)	22	15	4	3	59	22	+37	49	2.23	Promotion to Cymru Premier
3	Guilsfield	21	13	4	4	44	26	+18	43	2.05	
4	Colwyn Bay	24	14	5	5	44	30	+14	47	1.96	
5	Bangor City	22	10	7	5	27	25	+2	37	1.68	
6	Conwy Borough	23	9	6	8	43	44	−1	33	1.43	
7	Llanrhaeadr-ym-Mochnant	21	9	3	9	35	34	+1	30	1.43	
8	Penrhyncoch	23	10	2	11	29	35	−6	32	1.39	
9	Ruthin Town	23	7	7	9	29	34	−5	28	1.22	
10	Buckley Town	20	7	3	10	24	41	−17	24	1.20	
11	Gresford Athletic	22	7	5	10	34	34	0	26	1.18	
12	Llandudno	21	6	4	11	32	38	−6	22	1.05	
13	Llangefni Town	24	5	6	13	22	47	−25	21	0.88	
14	Porthmadog (R)	23	4	6	13	28	46	−18	18	0.78	Relegation to FAW League One
15	Corwen (R)	22	3	5	14	26	51	−25	14	0.64	Relegation to FAW League One
16	Llanfair United (R)	21	2	3	16	23	58	−35	9	0.43	Relegation to FAW League One

Updated to match(es) played on 7 March 2020. Source: Cymru North
Rules for classification: 1) Points; 2) Goal difference; 3) Goals scored; 4) Matches won; 5) Play-off.
(C) Champions; (P) Promoted; (R) Relegated
