= Wes Baynes =

English footballer (born 1988)

Personal information
- Full name: Wesley Baynes
- Date of birth: 12 October 1988 (age 38)
- Place of birth: Chester, England
- Height: 5 ft 11 in (1.80 m)
- Position: Defender

Senior career*
Years	Team	Apps	(Gls)
2007–2011	Wrexham	78	(11)
2010–2011	→ Altrincham (loan)	26	(2)
2011–2013	Chester	62	(8)
2013–2015	AFC Telford United	46	(0)
2014–2015	→ Colwyn Bay (loan)	28	(3)
2015	Colwyn Bay	4	(0)
2015–2017	Connah's Quay Nomads	58	(3)
2017–2018	Airbus UK Broughton	17	(3)
2018	Llandudno	12	(0)
2018–2020	Aberystwyth Town	53	(5)
2020–2021	Flint Town United	12	(0)
2021	Prestatyn Town	5	(0)
2021–2022	Runcorn Town	1	(0)
- * Club domestic league appearances and goals as of 13:19, 6 December 2023 (UTC)

Wesley Baynes (born 12 October 1988) is an English semi-professional footballer.

== Career ==
Born in Chester, Baynes came through the ranks at Wrexham, and made his first-team debut in a 2–2 home draw against Chester City in November 2007. After impressing in his first season, he signed an extension to his contract in March 2008, keeping him at the club until 2010. He scored his first goals for the club in the 4–2 away win against Lincoln City in May 2008 which was Wrexham's last match before relegation from the Football League. On 7 January 2009, Baynes handed in a transfer request amid rumours of interest from top clubs

In June 2011 he joined his hometown club Chester. Wes scored his first goal for Chester in the 3–0 victory over Worksop Town scoring the final goal in the 90th minute. He scored his second goal for Chester in the 3–0 victory over Chorley, scoring the 3rd goal from 30 yards. Baynes scored four more goals for Chester in their back-to-back title winning season, scoring the first goal in the 2–1 victory over Marine. He also scored Chester's only goal in the 1–1 draw against Northwich Victoria but his joy was soon to be cut short after being sent off later in the game. His fifth and sixth goal came in Chester's 4–0 win over Buxton.

In May 2013 it was announced that Baynes rejected the chance to stay with Chester for another season but this time in the Conference National. Instead he joined recently relegated AFC Telford United where he would be playing in the Conference North for another season. On 26 April 2014 he won promotion to the Conference Premier with Telford after they clinched the Conference North title on the final game of the season.

In late September 2014 he joined Colwyn Bay on loan and subsequently permanently, before signing for Connah's Quay Nomads in the Welsh Premier League.

In May 2015, Baynes scored the only goal in the Europa League play-off final against Airbus UK Broughton that sent Nomads into Europe for the first time in their history.

After spending two years with the club he signed for Airbus UK in the summer of 2017. In January 2018, he returned to the Welsh Premier with Llandudno.

At the end of the season, he was released by Llandudno and signed for Aberystwyth. Baynes made his Aberystwyth debut on the opening day of the season in a 2–0 win over former club Llandudno.

In June 2020, Baynes signed for Flint Town United.

He then signed in 2021 for Cymru North side Prestatyn Town.

In November 2021 he moved to Runcorn Town.

== Career statistics ==
As of 10 May 2022

Appearances and goals by club, season and competition
Club	Season	League			National Cup		League Cup		Europe		Other		Total	
Club	Season	Division	Apps	Goals	Apps	Goals	Apps	Goals	Apps	Goals	Apps	Goals	Apps	Goals
Wrexham	2007–08	League Two	12	2	0	0	0	0	—		1 (Note: Appearance(s) in the FAW Premier Cup.)	0	13	2
Wrexham	2008–09	Conference Premier	28	2	2	0	—		—		1 (Note: Appearance(s) in the FA Trophy.)	0	31	2
Wrexham	2009–10	Conference Premier	38	7	3	1	—		—		2	0	43	8
Wrexham	2010–11	Conference Premier	0	0	0	0	—		—		0	0	0	0
Wrexham	Total		78	11	5	1	0	0	—		4	0	87	12
Altrincham (loan)	2010–11	Conference Premier	26	2	1	0	—		—		5 (Note: Four appearances and four goals in Cheshire Senior Cup, one appearance in FA Trophy)	4	32	6
Chester	2011–12	NPL Premier Division	30	6	0	0	1	0	—		6 (Note: Two appearances in Cheshire Senior Cup, four appearances in FA Trophy)	0	37	6
Chester	2012–13	Conference North	32	2	3	0	—		—		4 (Note: Three appearances and one goal in Cheshire Senior Cup, one appearance in FA Trophy)	1	39	3
Chester	Total		62	8	3	0	1	0	—		10	1	76	9
AFC Telford United	2013–14	Conference North	39	0	0	0	—		—		2	0	41	0
AFC Telford United	2014–15	Conference Premier	7	0	0	0	—		—		0	0	7	0
AFC Telford United	Total		46	0	0	0	—		—		2	0	48	0
Colwyn Bay (loan)	2014–15	Conference North	28	3	2	0	—		—		1	0	31	3
Colwyn Bay	2015–16	NPL Premier Division	4	0	0	0	—		—		0	0	4	0
Colwyn Bay	Total		32	3	2	0	—		—		1	0	35	3
Connah's Quay Nomads	2015–16	Welsh Premier League	29	2	4	0	2	0	0	0	2 (Note: Appearances in UEFA Europa League play-offs)	2	37	4
Connah's Quay Nomads	2016–17	Welsh Premier League	29	1	3	1	1	0	4	1	0	0	37	3
Connah's Quay Nomads	Total		58	3	7	1	3	0	4	1	2	2	74	7
Airbus UK Broughton	2017–18	Cymru Alliance	17	3	2	1	3	0	—		1 (Note: Appearance in Cymru Alliance League Cup)	1	23	5
Llandudno	2017–18	Welsh Premier League	12	0	—		—		0	0	0	0	12	0
Aberystwyth Town	2018–19	Welsh Premier League	30	4	2	0	1	0	0	0	0	0	33	4
Aberystwyth Town	2019–20	Cymru Premier	23	1	2	1	3	0	0	0	0	0	28	2
Aberystwyth Town	Total		53	5	4	1	4	0	0	0	0	0	61	6
Flint Town United	2020–21	Cymru Premier	12	0	0	0	0	0	0	0	0	0	12	0
Prestatyn Town	2021–22	Cymru North	5	0	0	0	1	1	0	0	0	0	6	1
Runcorn Town	2021–22	NWCFL Division One North	1	0	0	0	0	0	0	0	0	0	1	0
Career total			402	35	24	4	12	1	4	1	25	8	467	49
