= 2017–18 Cymru Alliance =

Cymru Alliance
- Season: 2017–18
- Dates: 12 August 2017 – 15 May 2018
- Champions: Caernarfon Town
- Promoted: Caernarfon Town
- Relegated: Caersws; Queens Park; Llandudno Junction
- Matches: 210
- Goals: 830 (3.95 per match)
- All statistics correct as of 19 May 2018.

The 2017–18 Cymru Alliance (known as the Huws Gray Cymru Alliance for sponsorship reasons) is the 28th season of the top football league in North Wales. Mirroring its South Wales counterpart the Welsh Football League Division One, the 16-team division forms half of the second tier of the Welsh football league system and falls one level below the nationwide Welsh Premier League. The season began 12 August 2017 and is scheduled to conclude on 31 March 2018.

== Teams ==
Prestatyn Town were champions in the previous season and were promoted to the 2017–18 Welsh Premier League; they were replaced by both relegated teams from the 2016–17 Welsh Premier League, Airbus UK Broughton and Rhyl.

The bottom four teams from the previous season, Llanfair United, Mold Alexandra, Conwy Borough and Buckley Town, were all relegated to various third-tier district leagues for 2017–18. Three teams were successful in the 2016–17 Welsh third-tier leagues and were promoted in their place: Llandudno Junction (Welsh Alliance League runners-up, champions Glantraeth declined promotion), Queens Park (Welsh National League champions) and Rhayader Town (Mid Wales Football League champions).

On 27 July 2017, Rhayader Town withdrew from the league, citing that their players were unwilling to commit to the extra travelling involved with promotion. There was no replacement team - the league continued with 15 teams for this season only, playing 28 games each.

Locations of the 2017–18 Cymru Alliance teams

=== Stadia and locations ===
Team	Location	Stadium
Airbus UK Broughton	Broughton	The Airfield
Caernarfon Town	Caernarfon	The Oval
Caersws	Caersws	Recreation Ground (Caersws)
Denbigh Town	Denbigh	Central Park
Flint Town United	Flint	Cae-y-Castell
Gresford Athletic	Gresford	Clappers Lane
Guilsfield	Guilsfield	Guilsfield Community Centre
Holyhead Hotspur	Holyhead	The New Oval
Holywell Town	Holywell	Halkyn Road
Llandudno Junction	Llandudno Junction	Arriva Ground
Penrhyncoch	Penrhyn-coch	Cae Baker
Porthmadog	Porthmadog	Y Traeth
Queens Park	Caia Park, Wrexham	The Dunks
~~Rhayader Town~~	~~Rhayader~~	~~The Weirglodd~~
Rhyl	Rhyl	Belle Vue
Ruthin Town	Ruthin	Memorial Playing Fields

== League table ==
Pos	Team	Pld	W	D	L	GF	GA	GD	Pts	Promotion or relegation
1	Caernarfon Town (P)	28	19	8	1	98	31	+67	65	Promotion to the Welsh Premier League
2	Denbigh Town	28	19	3	6	69	43	+26	60	
3	Airbus UK Broughton	28	17	3	8	67	42	+25	54	
4	Guilsfield	28	15	8	5	54	38	+16	53	
5	Holywell Town	28	14	8	6	75	37	+38	50	
6	Rhyl	28	13	8	7	62	45	+17	47	
7	Porthmadog	28	13	5	10	70	46	+24	44	
8	Gresford Athletic (Note: Gresford Athletic were deducted three points.)	28	12	6	10	57	57	0	39	
9	Penrhyncoch	28	10	9	9	45	46	−1	39	
10	Ruthin Town	28	10	5	13	51	49	+2	35	
11	Flint Town United (Note: Flint Town United were deducted six points.)	28	10	6	12	49	42	+7	30	
12	Holyhead Hotspur	28	9	3	16	40	57	−17	30	
13	Caersws (R)	28	5	3	20	39	72	−33	18	Relegation to Welsh Level 3
14	Queens Park (R)	28	2	3	23	26	110	−84	9	Relegation to Welsh Level 3
15	Llandudno Junction (R)	28	1	4	23	28	115	−87	7	Relegation to Welsh Level 3

Updated to match(es) played on 19 May 2018. Source: Cymru Alliance, Soccerway
Rules for classification: 1) Points; 2) Goal difference; 3) Goals scored; 4) Matches won; 5) Play-off.
(P) Promoted; (R) Relegated

== Results ==
Home \ Away	AIR	CNR	CSW	DEN	FTU	GRE	GUI	HHD	HWL	LLJ	PRC	POR	QUE	RHL	RUT
Airbus UK Broughton	—	3–3	5–0	1–1	2–0	3–2	3–0	4–3	1–4	1–0	1–0	6–0	4–0	1–0	1–0
Caernarfon Town	3–0	—	5–3	7–0	2–0	6–2	2–0	1–2	4–2	8–1	5–0	3–1	7–0	1–1	3–0
Caersws	0–2	0–2	—	0–2	2–0	2–3	0–4	0–3	0–2	4–1	2–5	2–5	2–2	2–3	1–0
Denbigh Town	3–1	3–3	3–2	—	1–2	3–0	1–3	5–1	1–5	5–1	2–0	1–0	3–0	1–0	1–2
Flint Town United	0–3	1–2	0–1	1–3	—	2–2	3–0	3–0	0–3	3–1	1–1	2–0	4–0	2–3	2–1
Gresford Athletic	4–2	2–2	3–2	0–3	2–1	—	2–3	1–0	0–3	8–1	2–2	1–1	1–0	2–1	2–1
Guilsfield	3–1	2–2	4–3	2–2	2–2	2–1	—	2–0	0–0	3–3	2–1	1–3	2–1	0–0	1–0
Holyhead Hotspur	0–5	1–1	4–1	0–2	2–1	2–2	2–4	—	0–1	4–1	2–3	3–0	1–0	0–1	1–0
Holywell Town	2–5	1–1	3–1	2–3	3–3	2–2	0–2	4–0	—	8–0	1–1	2–0	8–0	2–2	5–0
Llandudno Junction	3–3	0–5	1–3	1–6	0–5	1–7	0–4	0–1	2–3	—	1–1	1–7	1–1	1–2	0–2
Penrhyncoch	0–3	1–2	2–2	0–1	0–3	3–1	1–1	2–1	1–0	4–1	—	1–0	3–1	2–2	2–2
Porthmadog	2–1	2–3	2–0	3–4	1–1	2–0	1–2	4–2	1–1	7–0	3–0	—	9–2	1–1	2–0
Queens Park	4–0	0–8	3–2	0–3	1–4	2–3	1–3	2–2	0–3	2–3	1–5	0–6	—	1–4	1–8
Rhyl	3–1	3–3	2–1	3–5	2–1	4–0	1–1	5–1	3–1	3–1	2–2	4–5	6–1	—	0–1
Ruthin Town	2–4	0–4	1–1	3–1	2–2	1–2	2–1	2–1	4–4	5–2	1–2	2–2	5–0	4–1	—

Updated to match(es) played on 19 May 2018. Source: Cymru Alliance
Legend: Blue = home team win; Yellow = draw; Red = away team win.
