= 2020–21 Cymru North =

Cymru North
- Season: 2020–21

The 2020–21 Cymru North season (also known as the 2020–21 JD Cymru North season for sponsorship reasons) would have been the second season of the second-tier northern region football in Welsh football pyramid. Teams were to play each other twice on a home and away basis.

Prestatyn Town were the defending champions. They were not promoted last season because they did not meet FAW tier 1 guidelines. Second placed Flint Town United were promoted instead. Because of the COVID-19 pandemic in Wales, this season was cancelled.

== Teams ==
The National League consists of 16 clubs.

=== Team changes ===
==== To Cymru North ====
Promoted from Mid Wales Football League Division 1

- Llanidloes Town

Promoted from Welsh Alliance League Division 1

- Holyhead Hotspur

Promoted from Welsh National League Division 1

- Holywell Town

Relegated from Cymru Premier

- Airbus UK Broughton

==== From Cymru North ====
Promoted to Cymru Premier

- Flint Town United

Relegated to Ardal NE

- Corwen
- Llanfair United

Relegated to Ardal NW

- Porthmadog

=== Stadia and Locations ===
Locations of teams in the 2020–21 Cymru North

Team	Home City	Home Ground	Capacity
Airbus UK Broughton	Broughton	Hollingsworth Group International Airfield	2,100
Bangor City	Bangor	The EUROGOLD Stadium	3,000
Buckley Town	Buckley	Globe Way Stadium	1,000
Colwyn Bay	Old Colwyn	4 Crosses Construction Arena	2,509
Conwy Borough	Conwy	Y Morfa Stadium	2,500
Gresford Athletic	Gresford	Clappers Lane	1,000
Guilsfield	Guilsfield	Community Centre Ground	1,100
Holyhead Hotspur	Holyhead	The New Oval	2,000
Holywell Town	Holywell	Halkyn Road	2,000
Llandudno	Llandudno	Maesdu Park	1,013
Llangefni Town	Llangefni	Bob Parry Field	3,000
Llanidloes Town	Llanidloes	Victoria Park	4,000
Llanrhaeadr	Llanrhaeadr-ym-Mochnant	The Recreation Field	1,000
Penrhyncoch	Penrhyncoch	Cae Baker	800
Prestatyn Town	Prestatyn	Bastion Road	2,500
Ruthin Town	Ruthin	Memorial Playing Fields	2,000

Source: footballgroundmap.com Cymru North Ground Information

== Season overview ==
Rhyl competed in the Cymru North league for the 2019–20 season. However, they were wound up on 21 April 2020. A phoenix club was set up the following month with the new name (voted by the fans association) of CPD Y Rhyl 1879. It was confirmed that the new club has secured the use of the Belle Vue stadium. Therefore, this league was reduced to sixteen teams.

The Professional Registration Periods for the 2020–21 season were as follows: The first period was to open on 27 July 2020 and was to close at midnight on 16 October 2020. Dates for the second period were to be confirmed prior to the season's cancellation. Summer transfers can be found here.

Since anti-COVID-19 restrictions were put in place by FAW, as from Monday 10 August 2020, clubs could have trained in groups of 15 and contact training was allowed at all-levels of football. However, competitive and exhibition matches were still not allowed to take place. The FAW eventually cancelled the 2020–21 season on 18 March 2021 because Cymru North and South did not have their Elite Status designation reinstated by the National Sport Group.

== League table ==
Pos	Team	Pld	W	D	L	GF	GA	GD	Pts
1	Airbus UK Broughton	0	0	0	0	0	0	0	0
2	Bangor City	0	0	0	0	0	0	0	0
3	Buckley Town	0	0	0	0	0	0	0	0
4	Colwyn Bay	0	0	0	0	0	0	0	0
5	Conwy Borough	0	0	0	0	0	0	0	0
6	Gresford Athletic	0	0	0	0	0	0	0	0
7	Guilsfield	0	0	0	0	0	0	0	0
8	Holyhead Hotspur	0	0	0	0	0	0	0	0
9	Holywell Town	0	0	0	0	0	0	0	0
10	Llandudno	0	0	0	0	0	0	0	0
11	Llangefni Town	0	0	0	0	0	0	0	0
12	Llanidloes Town	0	0	0	0	0	0	0	0
13	Llanrhaeadr	0	0	0	0	0	0	0	0
14	Penrhyncoch	0	0	0	0	0	0	0	0
15	Prestatyn Town	0	0	0	0	0	0	0	0
16	Ruthin Town	0	0	0	0	0	0	0	0

Source: Cymru North League Table
Rules for classification: 1) Points; 2) Goal difference; 3) Goals scored; 4) Matches won; 5) Play-off.

== Results ==
Home \ Away	AIR	BAN	BUC	COL	CON	GRE	GUI	HDH	HWL	LND	LGT	LID	LRH	PRC	PRE	RUT
Airbus UK Broughton	—															
Bangor City		—														
Buckley Town			—													
Colwyn Bay				—												
Conwy Borough					—											
Gresford Athletic						—										
Guilsfield							—									
Holyhead Hotspur								—								
Holywell Town									—							
Llandudno										—						
Llangefni Town											—					
Llanidloes Town												—				
Llanrhaeadr													—			
Penrhyncoch														—		
Prestatyn Town															—	
Ruthin Town																—

Source: Cymru North Match Results
Legend: Blue = home team win; Yellow = draw; Red = away team win.

== Season statistics ==
=== Top scorers ===
Season	Player	Club	Goals	Notes
2020–21	None			(League cancelled 18 March 2021 due to COVID-19 pandemic)

=== League placing ===
Season	Champions	Runner-up	Third place	Relegated teams
2020-21	None	None		None

=== Fair Play winner ===
The winner for each respective division's FAW Fair Play Table will be given £1,000 prize money and the FAW Fair Play Trophy.

Season	Club
2020–21	None
