= 2016–17 Cymru Alliance =

Cymru Alliance
- Season: 2016–17
- Dates: 12 August 2016 – 25 April 2017
- Champions: Prestatyn Town
- Promoted: Prestatyn Town
- Relegated: Conwy Borough; Buckley Town
- Matches: 240
- Goals: 930 (3.88 per match)

The 2016–17 Cymru Alliance (known as the Huws Gray Cymru Alliance for sponsorship reasons) was the 2016–17 season of the top football league in North Wales. Mirroring its South Wales counterpart the Welsh Football League Division One, the 16-team division forms half of the second tier of the Welsh football league system and falls one level below the nationwide Welsh Premier League. The season began on 12 August 2016 and concluded on 22 April 2017.

On 11 March 2017, Prestatyn Town defeated Gresford Athletic 1–0 to clinch the league title and promotion to the 2017–18 Welsh Premier League.

== Teams ==
Locations of the 2016–17 Cymru Alliance teams

Caernarfon Town were champions in the previous season but were ineligible for promotion to the 2016–17 Welsh Premier League; the promotion spot instead passed to runners-up Cefn Druids. No teams in the previous season were relegated from the top-flight into the Cymru Alliance; both Haverfordwest County and Port Talbot Town dropped into the 2016–17 Welsh Football League Division One.

Only the bottom-placed team from the 2015–16 Cymru Alliance, Rhayader Town, were relegated to a third-tier district league for 2016–17, the Mid Wales Football League Division One. Two teams were successful in the 2015–16 Welsh third-tier leagues and were promoted in Rhayader's place: Penrhyncoch and Ruthin Town.

=== Stadia and locations ===
Team	Location	Stadium
Buckley Town	Buckley	Globe Way
Caernarfon Town	Caernarfon	The Oval
Caersws	Caersws	Recreation Ground (Caersws)
Conwy Borough	Conwy	Y Morfa
Denbigh Town	Denbigh	Central Park
Flint Town United	Flint	Cae-y-Castell
Gresford Athletic	Gresford	Clappers Lane
Guilsfield	Guilsfield	Guilsfield Community Centre
Holyhead Hotspur	Holyhead	The New Oval
Holywell Town	Holywell	Halkyn Road
Llanfair United	Llanfair Caereinion	Mount Field
Mold Alexandra	Mold	Alyn Park
Penrhyncoch	Penrhyn-coch	Cae Baker
Porthmadog	Porthmadog	Y Traeth
Prestatyn Town	Prestatyn	Bastion Road
Ruthin Town	Ruthin	Memorial Playing Fields

== League table ==
Pos	Team	Pld	W	D	L	GF	GA	GD	Pts	Promotion or relegation
1	Prestatyn Town (C, P)	30	26	2	2	114	35	+79	80	Promotion to the Welsh Premier League
2	Caernarfon Town	30	19	7	4	83	45	+38	64	
3	Gresford Athletic	30	18	2	10	67	47	+20	56	
4	Porthmadog	30	16	2	12	64	48	+16	50	
5	Holywell Town	30	14	8	8	52	45	+7	50	
6	Flint Town United	30	14	6	10	62	47	+15	48	
7	Caersws	30	15	3	12	61	59	+2	48	
8	Guilsfield	30	12	7	11	54	46	+8	43	
9	Holyhead Hotspur	30	12	6	12	57	52	+5	42	
10	Denbigh Town	30	10	8	12	57	62	−5	38	
11	Ruthin Town	30	10	3	17	49	72	−23	33	
12	Penrhyncoch (Note: Penrhyncoch were deducted three points for fielding an ineligible player in a league match.)	30	9	7	14	39	48	−9	31	
13	Llanfair United (R)	30	7	4	19	36	69	−33	25	Relegation to Welsh Level 3
14	Mold Alexandra (R)	30	7	4	19	44	91	−47	25	Relegation to Welsh Level 3
15	Conwy Borough (R)	30	7	3	20	53	83	−30	24	Relegation to Welsh Level 3
16	Buckley Town (R)	30	6	4	20	38	81	−43	22	Relegation to Welsh Level 3

Source: Cymru Alliance, Soccerway
Rules for classification: 1) Points; 2) Goal difference; 3) Goals scored; 4) Matches won; 5) Play-off.
(C) Champions; (P) Promoted; (R) Relegated

== Results ==
Home \ Away	BUC	CNR	CSW	CWB	DEN	FTU	GRE	GUI	HHD	HWL	LLU	MOL	PRC	POR	PRE	RUT
Buckley Town	—	1–3	4–3	3–2	2–1	1–1	2–5	1–1	1–1	1–5	4–0	1–2	1–2	0–7	1–6	3–5
Caernarfon Town	6–0	—	1–1	5–2	2–2	1–1	5–1	5–1	2–0	6–2	2–4	2–1	3–1	2–0	1–4	3–2
Caersws	1–0	0–2	—	2–1	2–3	2–0	0–1	2–2	2–4	0–3	3–1	1–2	0–3	3–1	2–5	3–2
Conwy Borough	0–1	2–3	2–5	—	2–2	1–2	1–2	1–2	2–3	1–3	1–0	3–3	3–1	1–5	1–11	6–0
Denbigh Town	3–0	4–4	0–1	1–3	—	4–1	0–1	5–3	2–2	0–4	0–2	1–1	3–2	4–6	1–1	2–1
Flint Town United	2–0	1–6	1–3	2–1	3–1	—	1–2	2–0	4–0	1–2	0–0	3–1	1–1	0–2	2–3	2–0
Gresford Athletic	3–1	2–5	3–5	4–0	4–2	3–3	—	0–1	2–2	3–0	3–1	1–0	3–0	2–0	0–2	6–0
Guilsfield	2–0	0–0	2–1	2–3	5–0	1–2	5–1	—	2–0	0–0	2–3	1–0	3–0	1–2	0–3	2–1
Holyhead Hotspur	2–0	3–1	3–5	1–2	1–3	2–3	1–2	2–1	—	0–0	1–0	8–1	3–1	1–3	4–2	1–2
Holywell Town	3–3	2–3	1–1	3–1	2–1	1–3	1–0	2–1	1–1	—	2–1	2–0	1–1	2–1	0–1	4–3
Llanfair United	1–0	1–2	1–2	2–2	0–2	3–3	2–5	0–2	0–4	2–2	—	4–3	0–2	0–2	1–4	1–0
Mold Alexandra	3–2	2–2	1–3	4–3	1–3	0–12	2–1	2–2	1–2	0–2	5–0	—	0–1	2–6	2–10	0–3
Penrhyncoch	1–3	1–1	0–2	1–0	1–1	2–3	2–1	1–1	0–3	1–1	1–2	7–1	—	2–1	0–2	0–1
Porthmadog	3–1	1–2	1–2	1–3	3–2	0–2	1–2	1–5	3–0	1–0	4–2	1–0	1–1	—	1–3	3–1
Prestatyn Town	4–0	3–2	3–2	6–1	1–3	2–0	1–0	4–2	3–1	6–0	2–1	4–2	3–2	1–1	—	7–1
Ruthin Town	3–1	0–1	6–2	3–2	1–1	2–1	1–4	2–2	1–1	2–1	4–1	0–2	0–1	1–2	1–7	—

Source: Cymru Alliance
Legend: Blue = home team win; Yellow = draw; Red = away team win.
