= 2009–10 Cymru Alliance =

Cymru Alliance
- Season: 2009–10
- Champions: Llangefni Town
- Relegated: Holyhead Hotspur, Bethesda Athletic, Denbigh Town, Llangollen Town, Berriew, Mold Alexandra, Lex XI, Llanfairpwll, Caernarfon Town & Gresford Athletic
- Goals: 963
- Average goals/game: 3.54
- Top goalscorer: 28 – Shaun Beck (Flint Town United)
- Biggest home win: Llangefni Town 8–0 Llangollen Town; 10 April 2010
- Biggest away win: Penrhyncoch 0–8 Flint Town United; 24 October 2009
- Highest scoring: Llangollen Town 6–4 Mold Alexandra; 27 February 2010

The 2009–10 Cymru Alliance season began on Friday 14 August 2009 and ended on Saturday 8 May 2010. The league was won by Llangefni Town.

== Team changes from 2008–09 ==
Bala Town as 2008–09 champions were promoted to the Welsh Premier League with Caernarfon Town replacing them.

Berriew were promoted from Mid Wales League, Bethesda Athletic were promoted from the Welsh Alliance League and Llangollen Town were promoted from the Welsh National League.

Llandyrnog United were relegated to the Welsh Alliance League.

Mynydd Isa and Glantraeth both resigned from the league.

== League table ==
Pos	Team	Pld	W	D	L	GF	GA	GD	Pts	Relegation
1	Llangefni Town (C)	32	25	4	3	95	27	+68	79	
2	Flint Town United	32	23	6	3	84	29	+55	75	
3	Llandudno	32	19	8	5	73	31	+42	65	
4	Buckley Town	32	17	9	6	57	30	+27	60	
5	Penrhyncoch	32	16	7	9	51	46	+5	55	
6	Guilsfield	32	12	9	11	54	54	0	45	
7	Ruthin Town	32	13	5	14	48	61	−13	44	
8	Holyhead Hotspur (Note: Holyhead Hotspur deducted 3 points for failing to fulfil a fixture) (R)	32	13	4	15	53	52	+1	40	Relegation to Welsh Level 3
9	Bethesda Athletic (R)	32	10	9	13	70	59	+11	39	Relegation to Welsh Level 3
10	Denbigh Town (R)	32	10	9	13	56	56	0	39	Relegation to Welsh Level 3
11	Llangollen Town (R)	32	11	3	18	59	78	−19	36	Relegation to Welsh Level 3
12	Berriew (R)	32	10	5	17	49	74	−25	35	Relegation to Welsh Level 3
13	Mold Alexandra (R)	32	11	2	19	53	80	−27	35	Relegation to Welsh Level 3
14	Lex XI (R)	32	9	7	16	45	70	−25	34	Relegation to Welsh Level 3
15	Llanfairpwll (R)	32	9	5	18	38	60	−22	32	Relegation to Welsh Level 3
16	Caernarfon Town (Note: Caernarfon Town deducted 3 points for failing to fulfil a fixture) (R)	32	8	5	19	50	69	−19	26	Relegation to Welsh Level 3
17	Gresford Athletic (R)	32	5	5	22	28	87	−59	20	Relegation to Welsh Level 3

Source: Cymru Alliance
Rules for classification: 1) points; 2) goal difference; 3) number of goals scored.
(C) Champions; (R) Relegated

== Results ==
Home \ Away	BER	BET	BUC	CNR	DEN	FTU	GRE	GUI	HHD	LEX	LND	LPW	LGT	LNT	MOL	PRC	RUT
Berriew		1–0	1–4	2–1	1–1	2–4	4–1	1–2	2–1	1–3	1–1	2–1	1–4	2–3	2–4	0–1	2–1
Bethesda Athletic	6–1		1–2	1–2	3–3	1–3	3–0	2–3	3–0	6–1	4–5	1–1	0–3	1–1	0–2	5–1	2–4
Buckley Town	3–0	4–4		2–2	0–1	1–0	6–0	2–1	0–0	0–1	1–1	1–1	1–2	4–1	5–1	2–1	3–0
Caernarfon Town	3–1	1–4	0–1		3–1	0–2	2–5	2–3	0–3	2–1	5–1	2–2	1–4	4–0	2–3	2–4	1–2
Denbigh Town	2–0	5–2	0–0	2–0		2–2	1–1	4–1	4–1	5–0	1–2	1–2	0–2	1–2	2–0	1–2	2–2
Flint Town United	3–0	1–1	0–0	2–1	2–2		2–1	2–0	5–1	1–0	0–0	3–0	5–1	3–1	3–1	0–1	1–0
Gresford Athletic	0–0	0–6	0–2	0–3	1–4	3–3		1–1	0–3	2–4	0–3	1–0	0–2	2–0	2–0	2–5	0–3
Guilsfield	1–1	1–1	1–1	3–1	4–4	2–7	6–1		2–0	0–1	0–1	2–0	0–2	3–2	4–0	0–0	2–3
Holyhead Hotspur	5–0	5–0	1–1	5–1	2–0	0–2	1–1	2–3		5–1	0–1	4–2	0–4	2–1	1–2	2–0	1–2
Lex XI	0–3	3–3	0–2	1–0	2–2	1–2	0–3	3–3	0–1		2–2	0–4	2–3	2–2	4–2	2–2	1–2
Llandudno	5–1	0–0	2–0	4–0	1–0	1–2	4–0	1–2	4–1	4–0		3–1	0–0	3–0	0–1	5–0	4–1
Llanfairpwll	1–5	1–0	1–2	1–1	4–1	1–3	2–0	0–1	1–1	0–3	2–1		0–4	1–2	2–1	0–1	1–2
Llangefni Town	5–1	0–1	2–1	1–1	2–1	4–2	3–0	1–1	1–2	3–0	1–1	3–0		8–0	5–1	2–0	5–1
Llangollen Town	2–2	1–4	4–0	4–3	6–1	1–4	4–0	2–0	1–2	1–3	2–3	4–1	0–4		6–4	0–2	1–2
Mold Alexandra	1–4	1–4	0–2	3–1	1–2	0–4	2–1	3–1	2–0	1–2	1–4	2–3	1–6	6–2		1–1	3–3
Penrhyncoch	4–3	0–0	1–3	1–1	4–0	0–8	3–0	2–0	4–0	2–1	0–0	2–0	1–3	1–0	1–3		4–0
Ruthin Town	1–2	3–1	0–1	0–2	1–0	0–3	5–0	1–1	2–1	1–1	3–6	1–2	2–5	0–3	1–0	0–0	

Source: Cymru Alliance
Legend: Blue = home team win; Yellow = draw; Red = away team win.
