= 2018–19 Welsh Premier League =

Welsh Premier League
- Season: 2018–19
- Champions: The New Saints (13th title)
- Relegated: Llandudno; Llanelli Town
- Champions League: The New Saints
- Europa League: Connah's Quay Nomads; Barry Town United; Cardiff Metropolitan University
- Matches: 186
- Goals: 611 (3.28 per match)

The 2018–19 Welsh Premier League was the 27th and final season of the Welsh Premier League, the highest football league within Wales since its establishment in 1992. The New Saints are the defending champions. The season fixtures were announced on 27 June 2018. The season began on 10 August 2018. Teams play each other twice on a home and away basis, before the league split into two groups at the end of January 2019 – the top six and the bottom six.

The season ended on 26 April 2019.

== Teams ==
The bottom placed team from the previous season, Prestatyn Town, and Bangor City, were relegated to the Cymru Alliance for the 2018–19 season. Despite finishing 2nd the FAW Club Licensing Appeals Body decided to revoke Bangor City's Tier 1 and UEFA licence meaning that they would automatically drop down to the second level of Welsh football. This meant a reprieve for Carmarthen Town who had finished second bottom and would otherwise have been relegated.

Bangor and Prestatyn were replaced by Llanelli Town and Caernarfon Town, champions of the 2017–18 Welsh Football League Division One and 2017–18 Cymru Alliance respectively. Caernarfon Town are playing in the Welsh Premier League for the first time since the 2008–09 season, while Llanelli Town are a new side, replacing the original Llanelli AFC who were relegated at the end of the 2012–13 season and then wound up in the high court. The arrival of Barry Town United the previous season means that both of the former South Wales 'giants' are now back in the Welsh top-flight. In addition, Cardiff Met remain and Carmarthen Town were reprieved, so the balance of power is slowly shifting from what was for a while, an almost predominantly North Wales-based league.

Locations of the 2018–19 Welsh Premier League teams

=== Stadia and locations ===
Team	Location	Stadium	Capacity
Aberystwyth Town	Aberystwyth	Park Avenue	5,000
Bala Town	Bala	Maes Tegid	3,000
Barry Town United	Barry	Jenner Park	3,500
Caernarfon Town	Caernarfon	The Oval	3,000
Cardiff Metropolitan University	Cardiff	Cyncoed Campus	1,620
Carmarthen Town	Carmarthen	Richmond Park	3,000
Cefn Druids	Wrexham	The Rock	3,000
Connah's Quay Nomads	Connah's Quay	Deeside Stadium	1,500
Llandudno	Llandudno	Park MBi Maesdu	1,013
Llanelli Town A.F.C.	Llanelli	Stebonheath Park	3,700
Newtown	Newtown	Latham Park	5,000
The New Saints	Oswestry	Park Hall	2,000

=== Personnel and kits ===
Team	Head coach	Captain	Kit manufacturer	Front shirt sponsor
Aberystwyth Town	(Wales) Neville Powell/ (England) Matthew Bishop	(Republic of Ireland) Declan Walker	Acerbis	Cambrian Tyres
Bala Town	(England) Colin Caton	(Wales) Chris Venables	Macron	Aykroyd's
Barry Town United	(Wales) Gavin Chesterfield	(Wales) Jordan Cotterill	Macron	RIM Motors, LDS Motor Factors
Caernarfon Town	(Wales) Sean Eardley	(Wales) Nathan Craig	Errea	Gofal Bro Cyf., Parc Gwêl y Fenai
Cardiff Metropolitan University	(Wales) Christian Edwards	(England) Bradley Woolridge	Errea	Cardiff Metropolitan University
Carmarthen Town	(Wales) Neil Smothers	(Wales) Lee Surman	Legea	ATB Davies & Son, Castell Howell Foods
Cefn Druids	(Wales) Huw Griffiths	(England) Neil Ashton	Errea	Wrexham Lager
Connah's Quay Nomads	(Scotland) Andy Morrison	(England) George Horan	Macron	Gap Personnel
Llandudno	(Wales) Iwan Williams	(Wales) Danny Hughes	Adidas	Bengal Dynasty
Llanelli Town	(Wales) Andy Hill	(Wales) Joe Clarke	Macron	Gravell's Motors
The New Saints	(Wales) Scott Ruscoe	(England) Paul Harrison	Legea	RUK Group
Newtown	(Scotland) Chris Hughes	(United States) Jay Denny	Errea	Nidec Corporation

== League table ==
Pos	Team	Pld	W	D	L	GF	GA	GD	Pts	Qualification or relegation (Note: Teams play each other twice (22 matches), before the league splits into two groups (the top six and the bottom six) for the last 10 matches.)
1	The New Saints (C)	32	23	5	4	99	16	+83	74	Qualification for the Champions League first qualifying round
2	Connah's Quay Nomads	32	19	5	8	76	33	+43	62	Qualification to the Europa League first qualifying round
3	Barry Town United	32	17	5	10	54	51	+3	56	Qualification to the Europa League preliminary round
4	Caernarfon Town	32	13	7	12	45	47	−2	46	Qualification for the Europa League play-offs
5	Newtown	32	13	7	12	53	56	−3	46	Qualification for the Europa League play-offs
6	Bala Town	32	13	5	14	55	63	−8	44	Qualification for the Europa League play-offs
7	Cardiff Metropolitan University (O)	32	16	3	13	53	40	+13	51	Qualification for the Europa League play-offs
8	Aberystwyth Town	32	13	5	14	44	61	−17	44	
9	Carmarthen Town (Note: Carmarthen Town were deducted 3 points after fielding an ineligible player)	32	12	6	14	49	53	−4	39	
10	Cefn Druids	32	10	9	13	43	49	−6	39	
11	Llandudno (R)	32	5	7	20	33	65	−32	22	Relegation to FAW Championship North & Mid
12	Llanelli Town (R)	32	4	4	24	31	101	−70	16	Relegation to FAW Championship South & Mid

Source: Welsh Premier League, Soccerway
Rules for classification: 1) Points; 2) Goal difference; 3) Goals scored; 4) Matches won; 5) Play-off.
(C) Champions; (O) Play-off winners; (R) Relegated

== Results ==
Teams play each other twice on a home and away basis, before the league split into two groups – the top six and the bottom six.

=== Matches 1–22 ===
Home \ Away	ABE	BAL	BAR	CAE	CMU	CMR	CDR	CQN	LND	LNE	NTW	TNS
Aberystwyth Town	—	3–2	0–1	0–0	1–4	1–1	0–2	1–6	1–0	3–1	0–2	1–0
Bala Town	2–3	—	0–1	1–3	3–0	2–1	2–1	2–1	2–1	3–1	3–2	1–1
Barry Town United	2–1	3–2	—	2–1	2–1	1–0	2–1	2–0	2–1	5–2	4–1	0–2
Caernarfon Town	4–0	2–2	0–1	—	2–0	3–1	1–0	0–0	3–3	3–0	0–3	0–3
Cardiff Metropolitan University	2–3	3–0	3–0	0–1	—	1–1	1–0	1–3	0–1	4–0	2–1	4–1
Carmarthen Town	2–2	1–2	2–3	4–3	2–0	—	2–3	3–2	0–0	2–0	3–0	0–3
Cefn Druids	1–0	2–2	2–5	1–1	1–1	4–0	—	1–2	2–1	2–3	1–1	0–3
Connah's Quay Nomads	2–1	4–1	2–2	0–1	6–1	3–1	3–1	—	3–0	6–0	3–1	1–0
Llandudno	0–1	2–4	2–0	1–1	0–3	1–2	0–0	0–4	—	1–2	0–0	0–4
Llanelli Town A.F.C.	1–3	1–7	1–1	2–2	0–2	1–1	2–0	0–7	2–1	—	1–3	0–2
Newtown	2–1	2–0	2–0	2–0	2–1	1–1	1–1	1–1	3–1	7–1	—	1–1
The New Saints	6–0	0–0	5–1	0–1	1–1	6–0	7–0	3–0	6–1	5–0	4–0	—

Source: Welsh Premier League
Legend: Blue = home team win; Yellow = draw; Red = away team win.

=== Matches 23–32 ===
==== Top six ====
Home \ Away	BAL	BAR	CAE	CQN	NTW	TNS
Bala Town	—	2–5	1–0	1–4	2–2	0–7
Barry Town United	0–2	—	4–0	1–1	1–3	0–4
Caernarfon Town	1–0	2–0	—	1–0	4–1	0–3
Connah's Quay Nomads	1–0	1–1	6–2	—	2–0	0–2
Newtown	2–3	3–0	3–2	1–2	—	0–6
The New Saints	3–1	2–2	3–1	1–0	5–0	—

Source: Welsh Premier League
Legend: Blue = home team win; Yellow = draw; Red = away team win.

==== Bottom six ====
Home \ Away	ABE	CMU	CMR	CDR	LND	LNE
Aberystwyth Town	—	2–0	3–2	0–0	1–1	3–2
Cardiff Metropolitan University	1–0	—	1–0	3–0	3–0	3–2
Carmarthen Town	6–2	1–0	—	0–1	2–0	3–1
Cefn Druids	3–1	3–1	0–1	—	2–2	0–0
Llandudno	1–2	1–2	3–1	0–5	—	4–2
Llanelli Town A.F.C.	2–4	0–4	0–3	1–3	0–4	—

Source: Welsh Premier League
Legend: Blue = home team win; Yellow = draw; Red = away team win.

== UEFA Europa League play-offs ==
Teams that finish in positions third to seventh at the end of the regular season will participate in play-offs to determine the third participant for the 2019–20 UEFA Europa League, who will qualify for the preliminary round.

=== Semi-finals ===
10 May 2019
20:45

Newtown	1–2	Bala Town
Kenton 89'	Report	Smith 40'; Jones 53'

Latham Park
Attendance: 424
Referee: Kevin Parry
11 May 2019
20:30

Caernarfon Town	2–3	Cardiff Met.
Thomas 19'; Craig 90+2' (pen.)	Report	Baker 38'; Roscrow 68'; McCarthy 82'

The Oval (Caernarfon)
Attendance: 1,280
Referee: Lee Evans

=== Final ===
19 May 2019
18:15

Bala Town	1–1 (a.e.t.)	Cardiff Met
Jones 20'	Report	Evans 24'
Penalties
Burke (penalty missed); Venables (penalty missed); Hayes (penalty missed); Stephens (penalty scored)	1–3	McCarthy (penalty missed); Rees (penalty scored); Evans (penalty missed); Lewis (penalty scored); Evans (penalty scored)

Maes Tegid
Attendance: 623
Referee: Dean Jones

== Season statistics ==
Month	Manager of the Month		Player of the Month	
Month	Manager	Club	Player	Club
August	(Scotland) Andy Morrison	Connah's Quay Nomads	(Wales) Henry Jones	Bala Town
September	(Wales) Gavin Chesterfield	Barry Town United	(England) Callum Morris	Connah's Quay Nomads
October	(Wales) Scott Ruscoe	The New Saints	(Wales) Robbie Patten	Barry Town United
November	(Wales) Neville Powell	Aberystwyth Town	(Wales) Nathan Craig	Caernarfon Town
December				
