= 2007–08 Cymru Alliance =

Cymru Alliance
- Season: 2007–08
- Champions: Prestatyn Town

The 2007–08 Cymru Alliance was the eighteenth season of the Cymru Alliance after its establishment in 1990. The league was won by Prestatyn Town.

== League table ==
Pos	Team	Pld	W	D	L	GF	GA	GD	Pts	Promotion
1	Prestatyn Town (C, P)	32	24	4	4	93	29	+64	76	Promotion to Welsh Premier League
2	Bala Town	32	19	4	9	42	29	+13	61	
3	Flint Town United	32	16	10	6	62	42	+20	58	
4	Llandudno	32	16	8	8	58	36	+22	56	
5	Holyhead Hotspur	32	15	9	8	76	53	+23	54	
6	Gap Queens Park (Note: Gap Queens Park deducted 3 points)	32	15	10	7	82	47	+35	52	
7	Glantraeth	32	15	6	11	64	55	+9	51	
8	Denbigh Town	32	13	7	12	52	50	+2	46	
9	Guilsfield	32	12	5	15	64	55	+9	41	
10	Llanfairpwll	32	10	10	12	59	71	−12	40	
11	Mynydd Isa	32	10	9	13	45	51	−6	39	
12	Llandyrnog United	32	10	8	14	54	69	−15	38	
13	Ruthin Town	32	10	6	16	41	63	−22	36	
14	Buckley Town (Note: Buckley Town deducted 3 points)	32	8	9	15	45	80	−35	30	
15	Penrhyncoch	32	6	8	18	38	66	−28	26	
16	Lex XI (Note: Lex XI deducted 3 points)	32	6	7	19	44	85	−41	22	
17	Gresford Athletic	32	4	6	22	32	72	−40	18	

Source: Cymru Alliance
Rules for classification: 1) points; 2) goal difference; 3) number of goals scored.
(C) Champions; (P) Promoted
