= Neil Gibson (footballer, born 1979) =

Welsh footballer

Personal information
- Full name: Neil David Gibson
- Date of birth: 11 October 1979 (age 47)
- Place of birth: St Asaph, Wales
- Height: 5 ft 11 in (1.80 m)
- Position: Midfielder

Team information
- Current team: Altrincham (manager)

Youth career
- 1992–1997: Tranmere Rovers

Senior career*
Years	Team	Apps	(Gls)
1997–2000	Tranmere Rovers	1	(0)
2000–2001	Rhyl	5	(0)
2001–2002	Sheffield Wednesday	0	(0)
2002–2003	Southport	38	(5)
2003–2005	Halesowen Town		
2005	Leigh RMI	32	(0)
2005–2012	Prestatyn Town	170	(32)

International career
1998–1999	Wales U21	12	(1)

Managerial career
- 2007–2011: Prestatyn Town
- 2012–2018: Prestatyn Town
- 2018–2020: Prestatyn Town
- 2020–2022: Flint Town United
- 2022–2024: Connah's Quay Nomads
- 2025: Wealdstone
- 2025–: Altrincham
- * Club domestic league appearances and goals

Neil David Gibson (born 11 October 1979) is a Welsh manager and former footballer who is the manager of Altrincham.

== Management career ==
He was manager of Prestatyn Town from the 2007–2008 season until March 2011 when Lee Jones became first team manager and Gibson became Director of Football. He returned to the post of first team manager the following season, leading the club until January 2018 when he resigned.

After a short spell as a coach with Connah's Quay Nomads, he returned to Prestatyn Town as manager in October 2018. After leading the club to the Cymru North championship title in the 2019–20 season he left the club in October 2020, unhappy with the direction of the club under the new owner Jamie Welsh.

In December 2020 he was appointed manager of Flint Town United. He departed from the club in June 2022.

In August 2022, he returned to Connah's Quay Nomads as the club's first team manager prior to the start of the 2022-23 Cymru Premier season.

On 13 August 2024, Gibson parted company with the club.

On 27 January 2025, Gibson was appointed manager of National League side Wealdstone. On 26 May 2025, he departed the club by mutual consent due to the difficulties in commuting from Wales.

On 23 October 2025, Gibson was appointed interim manager of Altrincham following the dismissal of Phil Parkinson. On 25 November 2025, Gibson was appointed permanently as manager of Altrincham
