= Efekan Çolak =

Turkish professional footballer

Personal information
- Date of birth: 3 April 2003 (age 23)
- Place of birth: Konak, Turkey
- Height: 1.77 m (5 ft 10 in)
- Position: Forward

Team information
- Current team: Güzelbahce Belediyespor

Youth career
- Göztepe
- Aberystwyth Town

Senior career*
Years	Team	Apps	(Gls)
2021–2022	Aberystwyth Town	0	(0)
2022–2023	Penrhyncoch	16	(0)
2023–2024	Tuzlaspor	0	(0)
2025–	Güzelbahce Belediyespor		
- * Club domestic league appearances and goals as of 9 April 2025

Efekan Çolak (born 3 April 2003) is a Turkish footballer who plays as a forward for Güzelbahce Belediyespor.

== Club career ==
Çolak went through the youth system of Göztepe before moving to Wales where he joined Aberystwyth Town.

He made his senior debut for Aberystwyth in a league cup game, coming on for the final five minutes in a 5–2 loss to Cardiff Metropolitan University. That would be his only appearance for the club as he joined Penrhyncoch in July 2022.

After sixteen appearances for Penrhyncoch, Colak signed for Turkish side Tuzlaspor in January 2023.
