= 1993–94 Cymru Alliance =

Cymru Alliance
- Season: 1993–94
- Champions: Rhyl
- Relegated: Gresford Athletic

The 1993–94 Cymru Alliance was the fourth season of the Cymru Alliance after its establishment in 1990. The league was won by Rhyl. This season saw the league extend to 18 teams.

== League table ==
Pos	Team	Pld	W	D	L	GF	GA	GD	Pts	Promotion or relegation
1	Rhyl (C, P)	34	28	3	3	110	28	+82	87	Promotion to League of Wales
2	Welshpool Town	34	26	3	5	93	29	+64	81	
3	Wrexham Reserves	34	20	6	8	83	38	+45	66	
4	Llandudno	34	20	5	9	91	48	+43	65	
5	Mostyn Town	34	20	3	11	85	67	+18	63	
6	Brymbo	34	15	10	9	53	34	+19	55	
7	Cemaes Bay (Note: Cemaes Bay deducted 3 points)	34	15	9	10	61	43	+18	51	
8	Cefn Druids	34	14	5	15	74	72	+2	47	
9	Lex XI	34	13	7	14	47	53	−6	46	
10	Penrhyncoch	34	12	8	14	51	60	−9	44	
11	Carno	34	12	6	16	57	76	−19	42	
12	Buckley Town	34	10	11	13	47	55	−8	41	
13	Rhayader Town	34	10	5	19	50	86	−36	35	
14	Llanidloes Town	34	8	10	16	42	71	−29	34	
15	Ruthin Town	34	8	8	18	49	79	−30	32	
16	Knighton Town	34	6	8	20	39	78	−39	26	
17	Rhos Aelwyd	34	6	6	22	30	81	−51	24	
18	Gresford Athletic (R)	34	4	5	25	36	100	−64	17	Relegation to WNL Premier Division

Source: Cymru Alliance
Rules for classification: 1) points; 2) goal difference; 3) number of goals scored.
(C) Champions; (P) Promoted; (R) Relegated
