= 2018–19 Welsh Alliance League =

Welsh Alliance League
- Season: 2018–19
- Dates: 11 August 2018 – 18 May 2019
- Champions: Division 1 – Llangefni Town; Division 2 – Glan Conwy
- Relegated: Division 1 Barmouth & Dyffryn United; Llandudno Junction
- Matches: 419
- Goals: 1,707 (4.07 per match)
- Biggest home win: Division 1 Llangefni Town 8–0 Llandudno Junction (22 September 2018); Bodedern Athletic 8–0 Llandudno Junction (29 September 2018); Penrhyndeudraeth 8–0 Llandudno Junction (2 March 2019); Division 2 Llannefydd 13–0 Holyhead Town (6 April 2019)
- Biggest away win: Division 1 St Asaph City 1–8 Llangefni Town (9 March 2019); Division 2 Mochdre Sports 0–8 Holyhead Town (6 October 2018)
- Highest attendance: 410 – Division 1 Llangefni Town 2–0 Bodedern Athletic (1 May 2019); 200 – Division 2 Amlwch Town 0–3 Llannerch-y-medd (28 August 2018)
- All statistics correct as of 18 May 2019.

The 2018–19 Welsh Alliance League, known as the Lock Stock Welsh Alliance League for sponsorship reasons, marked the 35th season of the Welsh Alliance League, comprising two divisions that represent the third and fourth levels of the Welsh football pyramid.

There were fifteen teams in each division, with the champions of Division 1 promoted to the newly established FAW Championship North & Mid, while the bottom two teams faced relegation to Division 2. In Division 2, the champions and runners-up were promoted to Division 1. No team was relegated from Division 2, as Meliden resigned from the Welsh Alliance League at the end of the season.

The season began on 11 August 2018 and concluded on 18 May 2019.

== Division 1 ==
=== Teams ===
Conwy Borough, who were the previous season's champions, were promoted to the Cymru Alliance. They were replaced by Llandudno Junction, who were relegated from the Cymru Alliance.

The bottom two teams from the previous season, Pwllheli and Trearddur Bay, were relegated to Division 2 for 2018–19. However, Trearddur Bay resigned from the league in August 2018. Division 2 champions, Prestatyn Sports and runners-up, Bodedern Athletic, were promoted in their place.

Locations of the Division 1 teams of the 2018–19 Welsh Alliance League

==== Grounds and locations ====
| Team | Location | Ground |
|---|---|---|
| Barmouth & Dyffryn United | Barmouth | Wern Mynach |
| Bodedern Athletic | Bodedern | Cae Tŷ Cristion, Village Hall |
| Greenfield | Greenfield | Bagillt Road |
| Llanberis | Llanberis | Ffordd Padarn |
| Llandudno Albion | Llandudno | Ffordd Dwyfor |
| Llandudno Junction | Llandudno Junction | The Flyover |
| Llandyrnog United | Llandyrnog | Cae Nant |
| Llangefni Town | Llangefni | Bob Parry Field |
| Llanrug United | Llanrug | Eithin Duon |
| Llanrwst United | Llanrwst | Gwydir Park |
| Mynydd Llandegai | Mynydd Llandygai | Mynydd Llandegai |
| Nantlle Vale | Penygroes | Maes Dulyn |
| Penrhyndeudraeth | Penrhyndeudraeth | Maes Y Parc |
| Prestatyn Sports | Prestatyn | Gronant Playing Fields |
| St Asaph City | St Asaph | Roe Plas |

=== League table ===
| Pos | Team | Pld | W | D | L | GF | GA | GD | Pts | Promotion or relegation |
|---|---|---|---|---|---|---|---|---|---|---|
| 1 | Llangefni Town (C, P) | 28 | 21 | 4 | 3 | 74 | 16 | +58 | 67 | Promotion to FAW Championship North & Mid |
| 2 | Bodedern Athletic | 28 | 20 | 1 | 7 | 72 | 31 | +41 | 61 | |
| 3 | Llandudno Albion | 28 | 18 | 3 | 7 | 76 | 48 | +28 | 57 | |
| 4 | Greenfield | 28 | 13 | 7 | 8 | 54 | 46 | +8 | 46 | |
| 5 | Llanrug United | 28 | 12 | 9 | 7 | 57 | 40 | +17 | 45 | |
| 6 | Nantlle Vale (Note: Nantlle Vale were deducted three points for playing unregistered player.) | 28 | 13 | 6 | 9 | 63 | 40 | +23 | 42 | |
| 7 | Prestatyn Sports | 28 | 12 | 3 | 13 | 53 | 56 | −3 | 39 | |
| 8 | Penrhyndeudraeth | 28 | 11 | 5 | 12 | 65 | 56 | +9 | 38 | |
| 9 | St Asaph City | 28 | 11 | 5 | 12 | 54 | 61 | −7 | 38 | |
| 10 | Llanberis | 28 | 9 | 10 | 9 | 46 | 50 | −4 | 37 | |
| 11 | Llanrwst United | 28 | 11 | 3 | 14 | 52 | 52 | 0 | 36 | |
| 12 | Mynydd Llandegai | 28 | 9 | 8 | 11 | 46 | 65 | −19 | 35 | |
| 13 | Llandyrnog United | 28 | 5 | 6 | 17 | 30 | 68 | −38 | 21 | |
| 14 | Barmouth & Dyffryn United (Note: Barmouth & Dyffryn United were deducted three points for playing ineligible player.) (R) | 28 | 4 | 5 | 19 | 34 | 68 | −34 | 14 | Relegation to Division 2 |
| 15 | Llandudno Junction (R) | 28 | 2 | 3 | 23 | 19 | 98 | −79 | 9 | Relegation to Division 2 |

Source: Welsh Alliance League, NonLeagueMatters
Rules for classification: 1) Points; 2) Goal difference; 3) Goals scored; 4) Matches won; 5) Play-off.
(C) Champions; (P) Promoted; (R) Relegated

=== Results ===
| Home \ Away | BDU | BOD | GRE | LNB | LNA | LNJ | LLD | LLG | LRU | LRW | MYN | NAN | PEN | PRE | STA |
|---|---|---|---|---|---|---|---|---|---|---|---|---|---|---|---|
| Barmouth & Dyffryn United | — | 0–2 | 1–2 | 1–2 | 0–1 | 4–1 | 1–2 | 1–3 | 1–3 | 1–4 | 2–0 | 1–4 | 0–6 | 3–3 | 6–1 |
| Bodedern Athletic | 3–0 | — | 2–1 | 6–1 | 0–1 | 8–0 | 4–1 | 0–2 | 3–1 | 7–1 | 2–1 | 3–2 | 3–0 | 2–1 | 6–1 |
| Greenfield | 2–1 | 1–1 | — | 1–0 | 3–1 | 4–1 | 4–0 | 0–0 | 0–0 | 0–1 | 1–1 | 2–0 | 4–3 | 2–0 | 2–3 |
| Llanberis | 1–2 | 2–0 | 3–3 | — | 2–2 | 3–0 | 2–2 | 0–0 | 0–0 | 2–3 | 4–1 | 2–2 | 1–1 | 3–0 | 3–3 |
| Llandudno Albion | 3–1 | 5–1 | 4–0 | 5–1 | — | 4–3 | 0–1 | 0–5 | 1–1 | 4–3 | 8–1 | 3–0 | 2–4 | 4–0 | 1–2 |
| Llandudno Junction | 2–2 | 1–4 | 1–4 | 1–2 | 0–3 | — | 1–2 | 0–3 | 0–4 | 0–6 | 0–2 | 1–6 | 1–1 | 1–2 | 0–4 |
| Llandyrnog United | 2–1 | 1–0 | 1–3 | 1–1 | 2–3 | 0–1 | — | 1–2 | 1–2 | 1–3 | 1–1 | 1–1 | 1–1 | 1–2 | 0–3 |
| Llangefni Town | 7–0 | 2–0 | 4–2 | 2–1 | 2–0 | 8–0 | 3–0 | — | 1–2 | 3–0 | 0–2 | 1–2 | 4–1 | 2–0 | 1–0 |
| Llanrug United | 1–1 | 1–3 | 4–4 | 1–2 | 2–6 | 6–0 | 5–1 | 0–2 | — | 4–0 | 0–2 | 3–2 | 3–1 | 3–0 | 3–1 |
| Llanrwst United | 5–0 | 0–3 | 1–1 | 1–2 | 0–2 | 1–0 | 5–0 | 1–1 | 1–1 | — | 4–1 | 0–2 | 2–0 | 0–2 | 3–1 |
| Mynydd Llandegai | 1–1 | 1–4 | 4–0 | 4–1 | 2–3 | 1–1 | 4–3 | 0–0 | 2–2 | 3–2 | — | 1–1 | 1–5 | 4–2 | 0–4 |
| Nantlle Vale | 1–0 | 4–2 | 0–1 | 1–1 | 6–1 | 2–0 | 4–0 | 0–2 | 0–0 | 2–1 | 5–1 | — | 3–0 | 2–2 | 4–0 |
| Penrhyndeudraeth | 2–0 | 0–1 | 4–2 | 2–3 | 1–3 | 8–0 | 4–2 | 0–3 | 2–2 | 2–0 | 2–3 | 5–3 | — | 3–3 | 3–1 |
| Prestatyn Sports | 1–0 | 0–1 | 3–2 | 3–1 | 3–4 | 1–2 | 6–1 | 2–3 | 2–1 | 3–2 | 5–0 | 4–3 | 1–3 | — | 2–1 |
| St Asaph City | 3–3 | 0–1 | 2–3 | 2–0 | 2–2 | 3–1 | 1–1 | 1–8 | 1–2 | 4–2 | 2–2 | 2–1 | 4–1 | 2–0 | — |

Source: Welsh Alliance League - Results Grid
Legend: Blue = home team win; Yellow = draw; Red = away team win.

== Division 2 ==
=== Teams ===
Prestatyn Sports were champions in the previous season and were promoted to Division 1, along with runners-up Bodedern Athletic. They were replaced by Pwllheli, who were relegated from Division 1.

The bottom two teams from the previous season were Llannerch-y-medd and Llanfairpwll. However, Llannerch-y-medd were not relegated, and Llanfairpwll resigned from the league in August 2018. Gwynedd League champions, Holyhead Town and Vale of Clwyd and Conwy Football League Premier Division champions, Kinmel Bay, were promoted in their place.

Locations of the Division 2 teams of the 2018–19 Welsh Alliance League

==== Grounds and locations ====
| Team | Location | Ground |
|---|---|---|
| Aberffraw | Aberffraw | Tŷ Croes |
| Amlwch Town | Amlwch | Lôn Bach |
| Blaenau Ffestiniog Amateur | Blaenau Ffestiniog | Cae Clyd |
| Gaerwen | Gaerwen | Lôn Groes |
| Glan Conwy | Glan Conwy | Cae Ffwt |
| Holyhead Town | Holyhead | Millbank Sports Field |
| Kinmel Bay | Kinmel Bay | Cader Avenue |
| Llannefydd | Llannefydd | |
| Llannerch-y-medd | Llanerch-y-medd | Tan Parc |
| Meliden | Meliden | Ffordd Tŷ Newydd |
| Mochdre Sports | Mochdre | Swan Road |
| Penmaenmawr Phoenix | Penmaenmawr | Cae Sling |
| Pentraeth | Pentraeth | Bryniau Field |
| Pwllheli | Pwllheli | Leisure Centre, Recreation Road |
| Y Felinheli | Y Felinheli | Cae Selio, Bangor Street |

=== League table ===
| Pos | Team | Pld | W | D | L | GF | GA | GD | Pts | Promotion or relegation |
|---|---|---|---|---|---|---|---|---|---|---|
| 1 | Glan Conwy (C, P) | 28 | 20 | 4 | 4 | 92 | 32 | +60 | 64 | Promotion to Division 1 |
| 2 | Blaenau Ffestiniog Amateur (P) | 28 | 20 | 2 | 6 | 79 | 44 | +35 | 62 | Promotion to Division 1 |
| 3 | Llannefydd | 28 | 19 | 3 | 6 | 79 | 34 | +45 | 60 | |
| 4 | Pwllheli | 28 | 17 | 4 | 7 | 82 | 40 | +42 | 55 | |
| 5 | Aberffraw | 28 | 15 | 5 | 8 | 73 | 59 | +14 | 50 | |
| 6 | Llannerch-y-medd | 28 | 16 | 2 | 10 | 59 | 51 | +8 | 50 | |
| 7 | Kinmel Bay | 28 | 13 | 6 | 9 | 72 | 56 | +16 | 45 | |
| 8 | Y Felinheli | 27 | 12 | 7 | 8 | 75 | 52 | +23 | 43 | |
| 9 | Penmaenmawr Phoenix | 28 | 9 | 8 | 11 | 53 | 48 | +5 | 35 | |
| 10 | Pentraeth | 28 | 10 | 4 | 14 | 53 | 57 | −4 | 34 | |
| 11 | Gaerwen (Note: Gaerwen were deducted three points for non fulfilment of fixture.) | 28 | 8 | 11 | 9 | 53 | 54 | −1 | 32 | |
| 12 | Holyhead Town (Note: Holyhead Town were deducted three points for non fulfilment of fixture.) | 28 | 6 | 7 | 15 | 53 | 77 | −24 | 22 | |
| 13 | Meliden (Note: Meliden were deducted six points for non fulfilment of fixture.) | 27 | 6 | 2 | 19 | 31 | 92 | −61 | 14 | |
| 14 | Mochdre Sports | 28 | 3 | 3 | 22 | 32 | 96 | −64 | 12 | |
| 15 | Amlwch Town | 28 | 0 | 2 | 26 | 26 | 120 | −94 | 2 | |

Source: Welsh Alliance League, NonLeagueMatters
Rules for classification: 1) Points; 2) Goal difference; 3) Goals scored; 4) Matches won; 5) Play-off.
(C) Champions; (P) Promoted

=== Results ===
| Home \ Away | ABF | AML | BFA | GAR | GLC | HOL | KIN | LLF | LYM | MEL | MOC | PHO | PEN | PWL | FEL |
|---|---|---|---|---|---|---|---|---|---|---|---|---|---|---|---|
| Aberffraw | — | 2–0 | 1–4 | 2–2 | 1–2 | 2–1 | 2–2 | 2–0 | 6–3 | 4–1 | 5–1 | 2–1 | 2–0 | 1–1 | 2–1 |
| Amlwch Town | 1–8 | — | 4–5 | 0–2 | 1–3 | 2–2 | 0–7 | 0–2 | 0–3 | 2–3 | 1–3 | 1–6 | 0–5 | 0–7 | 1–7 |
| Blaenau Ffestiniog Amateur | 8–2 | 4–0 | — | 0–1 | 4–1 | 2–0 | 2–3 | 3–2 | 2–1 | 5–0 | 4–0 | 2–2 | 2–0 | 1–1 | 4–2 |
| Gaerwen | 1–1 | 3–0 | 0–4 | — | 2–5 | 1–4 | 2–3 | 2–2 | 0–3 | 2–0 | 0–1 | 2–2 | 1–1 | 4–5 | 2–2 |
| Glan Conwy | 10–2 | 10–2 | 3–1 | 2–4 | — | 1–1 | 1–0 | 2–1 | 2–2 | 9–0 | 3–0 | 3–0 | 1–0 | 3–0 | 1–1 |
| Holyhead Town | 0–5 | 5–0 | 1–2 | 2–2 | 1–3 | — | 4–4 | 2–0 | 1–2 | 3–3 | 1–0 | 0–0 | 2–6 | 4–1 | 2–3 |
| Kinmel Bay | 1–2 | 2–1 | 0–3 | 3–0 | 1–5 | 3–3 | — | 1–3 | 4–0 | 1–5 | 3–3 | 2–0 | 3–1 | 4–2 | 1–1 |
| Llannefydd | 0–1 | 4–2 | 4–0 | 2–2 | 3–2 | 13–0 | 3–1 | — | 4–1 | 4–0 | 5–1 | 3–1 | 3–1 | 2–0 | 4–2 |
| Llannerch-y-medd | 5–3 | 3–2 | 5–0 | 1–1 | 4–2 | 3–0 | 2–0 | 1–2 | — | 1–2 | 2–1 | 3–2 | 2–0 | 0–3 | 1–4 |
| Meliden | 0–4 | 2–0 | 1–2 | 0–3 | 0–5 | 6–2 | 0–6 | 2–3 | 1–2 | — | 1–5 | 0–4 | 0–0 | 0–7 | 1–4 |
| Mochdre Sports | 1–7 | 3–3 | 3–4 | 0–2 | 0–3 | 0–8 | 1–4 | 0–3 | 0–3 | 0–1 | — | 2–2 | 2–4 | 0–4 | 1–4 |
| Penmaenmawr Phoenix | 1–1 | 6–1 | 2–3 | 2–2 | 0–5 | 3–2 | 1–2 | 1–0 | 0–1 | 4–1 | 5–1 | — | 2–2 | 2–1 | 1–1 |
| Pentraeth | 2–1 | 3–1 | 0–2 | 1–5 | 1–1 | 2–1 | 4–7 | 1–3 | 2–3 | 5–0 | 3–1 | 0–1 | — | 0–4 | 4–2 |
| Pwllheli | 4–2 | 3–0 | 3–1 | 1–1 | 0–1 | 5–1 | 1–0 | 2–3 | 3–1 | 5–1 | 6–1 | 4–2 | 5–2 | — | 2–1 |
| Y Felinheli | 6–0 | 7–1 | 2–5 | 5–4 | 0–3 | 3–0 | 4–4 | 1–1 | 4–1 | VOID | 5–1 | 1–0 | 0–3 | 2–2 | — |

Source: Welsh Alliance League - Results Grid
Legend: Blue = home team win; Yellow = draw; Red = away team win.
