= Chris Marriott =

Welsh footballer

Personal information
- Full name: Christopher Michael Marriott
- Date of birth: 24 September 1989 (age 37)
- Place of birth: Wrexham, Wales
- Height: 1.76 m (5 ft 9 in)
- Position: Full back

Team information
- Current team: Caernarfon Town
- Number: 23

Youth career
- Wrexham

Senior career*
Years	Team	Apps	(Gls)
2009–2024	The New Saints	375	(20)
2024–2026	Connah's Quay Nomads	46	(1)
2026–	Caernarfon Town	14	(0)
- * Club domestic league appearances and goals as of 08:24, 8 November 2026 (UTC)

Christopher Michael Marriott (born 24 September 1989) is a Welsh professional footballer who plays as a full back for Caernarfon Town.

A youth player with Wrexham, he played for and captained Cymru Premier club The New Saints.

== Career ==
Born in Wrexham, Marriott played for Wrexham before signing for The New Saints in 2009. He became club captain from the 2019–20 season. In August 2022 he criticised the players after the club were eliminated from the League Cup, and in January 2023 he wanted to proceed in the Welsh Cup. In March 2023 he became the most decorated player in Cymru Premier history, after winning his 11th league title with TNS.

Marriott left TNS in May 2024. In June 2024 he signed for Connah's Quay Nomads and renewed his contract withe the club the following summer. At the end of the 2025–26 season it was confirmed he would leave the club.

On 7 June 2026 it was announced he would join Caernarfon Town for the 2026–27 season.
