= Gresford Athletic F.C. =

Association football club in Wales

CPD Gresford Athletic FC
- Full name: CPD Gresford Athletic FC
- Nicknames: The Colliers; The Attics
- Founded: 1946; 80 years ago
- Ground: Clappers lane
- Capacity: / (250seated)
- Manager: Anthony Weaver
- League: Cymru North
- 2025–26: Cymru North, 15th of 16
- Website: https://www.gresfordathleticfc.com/
Home colours	Away colours

CPD Gresford Athletic FC is a football team based in Gresford in Wrexham, Wales. They are members of the Cymru North and play at Clappers Lane.

== History ==
The club was founded in 1946. They first played in the Welsh National League (Wrexham Area). In 1990 they joined the new Cymru Alliance. They were relegated back to the Welsh National League in 1994, which they won in 1996 and 2001, the latter title earning them promotion back to the Cymru Alliance. They were again relegated in 2010, and another title in 2015 saw them return to tier 2 again. In 2019 the league became the Cymru North.

In February 2023 the club agreed a groundshare with Cefn Druids at The Rock. In September 2024 they moved to Airbus UK Broughton's ground at The Airfield.

In June 2025, the club unveiled a new crest to coincide with the start of the 2025–26 season. The club wanted to modernise their visual identity while maintaining links to their heritage.

On 13 November 2025 it was announced that six members of staff at the club had resigned. The news came out of the blue for Gresford Athletic, and they described their future as "uncertain" after the resignations.

On 3 April 2026 they played their first match back at Clappers Lane, after having moved away in 2023. They played Caersws and lost 2–0.

== Managerial history ==
Manager	Nationality	From	To	Honours
Alan (Sammy) Jones	Wales	1980s	May 2008	2 x (Welsh National League Premier 95/96 - managed by Anthony Taylor] 2 x Welsh National League Division One Cup 2 x Welsh National League Division Two Cup 1 x NEWFA Challenge Cup
Sam Ainge	Wales	May 2008	17 May 2014	2 x Welsh National League Premier Cup
Eddie Maurice-Jones	Wales	22 May 2014	12 November 2016	1 x Welsh National League Premier
Steve Halliwell	England	14 November 2016	16 May 2019	NEWFA Challenge Cup
Richard Capper	Wales	16 May 2019	13 June 2020	
Eddie Maurice-Jones	Wales	13 June 2020	13 November 2025	NEWFA challenge Final

Dave Evans- England - 26 November 2025-17 May 2026

== First Team squad ==
As of 14 August 2025

Note: Flags indicate national team as defined under FIFA eligibility rules; some limited exceptions apply. Players may hold more than one non-FIFA nationality.

No.	Pos.	Nation	Player
1	GK	WAL	Lewis Dutton
2	DF	WAL	James Smith
3	DF	ENG	Alex Smith
4	DF	WAL	Adam Hesp
5	MF	WAL	Paul Johnson (vice-captain)
6	MF	WAL	Josh Griffiths (captain)
7	FW	WAL	Haci Ozlu
8	MF	WAL	Iwan Roberts
9	FW	ENG	Mark Winslade
10	FW	WAL	Jake Roberts

No.	Pos.	Nation	Player
11	MF	ENG	Charlie Mann
12	MF	WAL	Mitchell Williams
14	MF	ENG	Alex Buxton
15	DF	WAL	Elliott Orton
16	MF	ENG	Dan Collins (on loan from Airbus UK Broughton)
18	FW	WAL	Toby Gallagher-Keenan
17	DF	WAL	Billy Nicholas
19	MF	WAL	Tom Smith
21	DF	WAL	Joe Nelson
33	GK	WAL	Josh Roberts

== League history ==
Season	League	Final position
1946–47	Welsh National League East	1st – Champions (Promoted)
1947–48	Welsh National League Senior	12th
1948–49	Welsh National League Senior	14th
1949–50	Welsh National League Division Two	10th
1950–51	Welsh National League Division Two	5th
1951–52	Welsh National League Division Two	6th
1952–53	Welsh National League Division Two	10th
1953–54	–	–
1954–55	–	–
1955–56	Welsh National League Division Three	4th
1956–57	Welsh National League Division Three	3rd
1957–58	–	–
1958–59	–	–
1959–60	–	–
1960–61	–	–
1961–62	Welsh National League Division Two	7th
1962–63	Welsh National League Division Two	1st – Champions
1963–64	Welsh National League Division Two	6th
1964–65	Welsh National League Division Two	4th
1965–66	Welsh National League Division Two	2nd (Promoted)
1966–67	Welsh National League Division One	16th
1967–68	Welsh National League Division Three	19th
1968–69	Welsh National League Division Three A	8th
1969–70	Welsh National League Division One	2nd
1970–71	Welsh National League Division One	7th
1971–72	Welsh National League Division One	5th
1972–73	Welsh National League Division One	4th
1973–74	Welsh National League Division One	3rd
1974–75	Welsh National League Division One	9th
1975–76	Welsh National League Division One	7th
1976–77	Welsh National League Division One	14th
1977–78	Welsh National League Division One	13th
1978–79	Welsh National League Division One	9th
1979–80	Welsh National League Division One	12th
1980–81	Welsh National League Division One	9th
1981–82	Welsh National League Division One	15th
1982–83	Welsh National League Division One	14th
1983–84	Welsh National League Division One	7th
1984–85	Welsh National League Division One	9th
1985–86	Welsh National League Division One	13th
1986–87	Welsh National League Division One	11th
1987–88	Welsh National League Division One	8th
1988–89	Welsh National League Division One	14th
1989–90	Welsh National League Division One	6th
1990–91	Cymru Alliance	13th
1991–92	Cymru Alliance	13th
1992–93	Cymru Alliance	14th
1993–94	Cymru Alliance	18th (Relegated)
1994–95	Welsh National League Premier	6th
1995–96	Welsh National League Premier	1st – Champions
1996–97	Welsh National League Premier	11th
1997–98	Welsh National League Premier	5th
1998–99	Welsh National League Premier	3rd
1999–2000	Welsh National League Premier	4th
2000–01	Welsh National League Premier	1st – Champions (Promoted)
2001–02	Cymru Alliance	11th
2002–03	Cymru Alliance	13th
2003–04	Cymru Alliance	13th
2004–05	Cymru Alliance	8th
2005–06	Cymru Alliance	14th
2006–07	Cymru Alliance	12th
2007–08	Cymru Alliance	17th
2008–09	Cymru Alliance	15th
2009–10	Cymru Alliance	17th (Relegated)
2010–11	Welsh National League Premier	13th
2011–12	Welsh National League Premier	7th
2012–13	Welsh National League Premier	4th
2013–14	Welsh National League Premier	5th
2014–15	Welsh National League Premier	1st – Champions (Promoted)
2015–16	Cymru Alliance	6th
2016–17	Cymru Alliance	3rd
2017–18	Cymru Alliance	8th
2018–19	Cymru Alliance	10th
2019–20	Cymru North	11th
2020–21	Cymru North	Cancelled, due to COVID-19 pandemic
2021–22	Cymru North	11th
2022–23	Cymru North	10th
2023–24	Cymru North	10th
2024–25	Cymru North	11th

== Honours ==
- Welsh National League Premier
  - Champions (3): 1995–96; 2000–01; 2014–15
- Welsh National East Division
  - Champions (1): 1946–47
- Welsh National Division Two
  - Champions (1): 1962–63
- Welsh National Division Three A
  - Champions (1): 1969–70
- FAW Reserve League North East
  - Champions (1): 2021–22
- Welsh National League Premier Division Cup
  - Winners (2): 2010–2011; 2011–2012
  - Runners Up (1): 2014–15
- Welsh National League Division One Cup
  - Winners (2): 2004–2005; 2005–2006
  - Runners Up (2): 1990–91; 1998–99
- Welsh National League Division Two Cup
  - Winners (3): 1966–67; 1992–93; 2006–07
- NEWFA Challenge Cup
  - Winners (3): 1972–73; 1991–92; 2016–17
  - Runners Up (2): 2018–19; 2022–23
- FAW Trophy
  - Runners Up (1): 2000–01
- Cymru Alliance League Cup
  - Runners Up (2): 1992–93; 2017–18
- NEWFA Horace Wynne Cup
  - Runners Up (1): 2005–06
