= 2017–18 Welsh Premier League =

Welsh Premier League
- Season: 2017–18
- Dates: 11 August 2017 – 20 May 2018
- Champions: The New Saints (12th title)
- Relegated: Prestatyn Town; Bangor City
- Champions League: The New Saints
- Europa League: Connah's Quay Nomads; Bala Town; Cefn Druids
- Matches: 192
- Goals: 544 (2.83 per match)
- Biggest home win: Aberystwyth Town 7-1 Prestatyn Town (16 December 2017)
- Biggest away win: Carmarthen Town 0–5 The New Saints (30 September 2017)
- Highest scoring: Bangor City 5–2 The New Saints (11 August 2017); The New Saints 6–1 Prestatyn Town (14 October 2017); The New Saints 5–2 Carmarthen Town (25 November 2017)
- All statistics correct as of 15 December 2017.

The 2017–18 Welsh Premier League was the 26th season of the Welsh Premier League, the highest football league within Wales since its establishment in 1992. The New Saints are the defending champions. The season fixtures were announced on 23 June 2017. The season began on 11 August 2017 and concluded in April 2018; the Europa League play-offs followed afterwards. Teams played each other twice on a home and away basis, before the league split into two groups at the end of January 2018 – the top six and the bottom six.

On 26 April 2018 the FAW Club Licensing Appeals Body decided to revoke Bangor City's Tier 1 and UEFA licence meaning that they would automatically drop down to the second level of Welsh football the next season and would not be able to compete for a place in the following season's Europa League.

== Teams ==
Locations of the 2017–18 Welsh Premier League teams

The bottom two placed teams from the previous season, Rhyl and Airbus UK Broughton were relegated to the Cymru Alliance for the 2017–18 season. They were replaced by Barry Town United and Prestatyn Town, champions of the 2016–17 Welsh Football League Division One and 2016–17 Cymru Alliance respectively. Barry Town United are playing in the Welsh Premier League for the first time since the 2003–04 season, while Prestatyn Town were returning to the top flight after being relegated in the 2014–15 season.

=== Stadia and locations ===
Team	Location	Stadium	Capacity
Aberystwyth Town	Aberystwyth	Park Avenue	5,000
Bala Town	Bala	Maes Tegid	3,000
Bangor City	Bangor	Nantporth	3,000
Barry Town United	Barry	Jenner Park	3,500
Cardiff Metropolitan University	Cardiff	Cyncoed Campus	1,620
Carmarthen Town	Carmarthen	Richmond Park	3,000
Cefn Druids	Wrexham	The Rock	3,000
Connah's Quay Nomads	Connah's Quay	Deeside Stadium	1,500
Llandudno	Llandudno	Park MBi Maesdu	1,013
Newtown	Newtown	Latham Park	5,000
Prestatyn Town	Prestatyn	Bastion Road	2,000
The New Saints	Oswestry	Park Hall	2,000

== League table ==
Pos	Team	Pld	W	D	L	GF	GA	GD	Pts	Qualification or relegation (Note: Teams play each other twice (22 matches), before the league split into two groups (the top six and the bottom six) for the last 10 matches.)
1	The New Saints (C)	32	23	5	4	83	32	+51	74	Qualification for the Champions League first qualifying round
2	Bangor City (D, R)	32	19	3	10	49	32	+17	60	Relegation to Cymru Alliance (Note: Bangor City were relegated after failing to obtain Tier One and UEFA licences for the 2018-19 Welsh Premier League and 2018-19 UEFA Europa League respectively. Carmarthen Town therefore remained in the league for the following season.)
3	Connah's Quay Nomads	32	17	6	9	46	29	+17	57	Qualification for the Europa League first qualifying round (Note: Connah's Quay Nomads qualified for the Europa League first qualifying round by winning the 2017–18 Welsh Cup.)
4	Bala Town	32	15	4	13	37	48	−11	49	Qualification to the Europa League preliminary round
5	Cefn Druids (O)	32	12	8	12	38	41	−3	44	Qualification for the Europa League play-offs (Note: Teams play for one spot in the Europa League preliminary round.)
6	Cardiff Metropolitan University	32	12	7	13	46	41	+5	43	Qualification for the Europa League play-offs
7	Barry Town United	32	16	5	11	39	31	+8	53	Qualification for the Europa League play-offs
8	Newtown	32	12	4	16	52	55	−3	40	
9	Aberystwyth Town	32	10	7	15	47	56	−9	37	
10	Llandudno	32	9	9	14	39	44	−5	36	
11	Carmarthen Town	32	8	5	19	35	62	−27	29	
12	Prestatyn Town (R)	32	4	7	21	27	67	−40	19	Relegation to Cymru Alliance

Source: Welsh Premier League, Soccerway
Rules for classification: 1) Points; 2) Goal difference; 3) Goals scored; 4) Matches won; 5) Play-off.
(C) Champions; (D) Disqualified; (O) Play-off winners; (R) Relegated

== Results ==
Teams play each other twice on a home and away basis, before the league split into two groups – the top six and the bottom six.

=== Matches 1–22 ===
Home \ Away	ABE	BAL	BAN	BAR	CMU	CMR	CDR	CQN	LND	NTW	PRE	TNS
Aberystwyth Town	—	1–2	2–3	0–0	0–2	1–2	1–0	4–2	0–2	3–0	7–1	1–2
Bala Town	1–1	—	0–1	2–0	2–1	0–4	2–1	1–1	2–1	3–0	1–0	0–3
Bangor City	3–2	5–0	—	0–1	2–3	1–0	0–1	1–0	0–1	3–1	1–0	5–2
Barry Town United	1–1	0–1	1–1	—	1–0	3–1	1–3	0–1	2–0	2–0	4–0	0–1
Cardiff Metropolitan University	1–1	1–2	3–1	3–0	—	5–0	1–1	0–0	1–0	2–0	2–1	0–0
Carmarthen Town	1–0	0–1	0–0	1–2	0–2	—	0–1	1–2	0–0	0–2	0–3	0–5
Cefn Druids	2–0	3–0	0–2	2–1	0–3	0–0	—	0–1	0–0	0–0	2–2	1–3
Connah's Quay Nomads	5–1	1–0	0–2	3–0	1–0	3–1	1–1	—	1–1	4–0	2–1	2–2
Llandudno	2–3	1–1	0–0	1–0	0–0	3–0	1–2	1–0	—	2–1	2–2	0–1
Newtown	4–0	1–3	1–2	3–0	3–2	4–1	1–1	0–1	2–1	—	3–0	2–3
Prestatyn Town	1–2	0–2	4–2	1–0	0–2	3–2	1–2	0–4	1–3	0–0	—	1–4
The New Saints	4–0	3–0	2–1	0–1	2–1	5–2	4–0	3–0	1–0	2–4	6–1	—

Source: Welsh Premier League
Legend: Blue = home team win; Yellow = draw; Red = away team win.

=== Matches 23–32 ===
==== Top six ====
Home \ Away	BAL	BAN	CMU	CDR	CQN	TNS
Bala Town	—	1–2	1–0	1–0	0–1	1–4
Bangor City	1–2	—	3–0	1–0	1–0	1–0
Cardiff Metropolitan University	4–3	1–2	—	1–3	0–2	1–1
Cefn Druids	3–1	0–2	3–1	—	2–0	2–2
Connah's Quay Nomads	1–1	1–0	3–0	2–1	—	0–1
The New Saints	3–0	3–0	3–3	5–1	3–1	—

Source: Welsh Premier League
Legend: Blue = home team win; Yellow = draw; Red = away team win.

==== Bottom six ====
Home \ Away	ABE	BAR	CMR	LND	NTW	PRE
Aberystwyth Town	—	0–2	1–1	3–1	5–3	1–1
Barry Town United	3–1	—	1–0	4–1	1–1	2–0
Carmarthen Town	3–3	0–1	—	3–2	3–2	3–1
Llandudno	1–0	2–3	3–2	—	3–4	2–2
Newtown	0–1	1–2	2–3	3–2	—	3–0
Prestatyn Town	0–1	0–0	0–1	0–0	0–1	—

Source: Welsh Premier League
Legend: Blue = home team win; Yellow = draw; Red = away team win.

== UEFA Europa League play-offs ==
Teams that finish in positions third to seventh at the end of the regular season will participate in play-offs to determine the third participant for the 2018–19 UEFA Europa League, who will qualify for the preliminary round. However, due to Bangor City's expulsion, there was just one semi-final, with fifth place Cefn Druids gaining a bye to the final after Bala Town (who had finished 4th) took Bangor's place.

=== Semi-final ===
12 May 2018
17:15hrs

Cardiff Met	4–1	Barry Town United
Roscrow 26', 73'; Evans 30'; Sainty 43' (o.g.)	Report	Hood 89'

Cyncoed Campus
Attendance: 665
Referee: Dean John

=== Final ===
20 May 2018
12:25hrs

Cefn Druids	1–0	Cardiff Met
J.Davies 16'

The Rock
Attendance: 779
Referee: Nick Pratt

== Season statistics ==
Month	Manager of the Month		Player of the Month	
Month	Manager	Club	Player	Club
August	(Wales) Alan Morgan	Llandudno	(Wales) Adam Roscrow	Cardiff Met.
September	(Wales) Scott Ruscoe	The New Saints	(Wales) Kayne McLaggon	Barry Town United
October	(Wales) Huw Griffiths	Cefn Druids	(Wales) Eliot Evans	Cardiff Met.
November	(England) Kevin Nicholson	Bangor City	(England) Dean Rittenberg	Bangor City
December	(Wales) Colin Caton	Bala Town	(Wales) Chris Venables	Bala Town
January	(Wales) Scott Ruscoe	The New Saints	(Wales) Aeron Edwards	The New Saints
February	(Wales) Gavin Chesterfield	Barry Town United	(Wales) Declan Walker	Aberystwyth Town
March	(Wales) Gavin Chesterfield	Barry Town United	(Wales) Michael Bakare	Connah's Quay Nomads

=== Scoring ===
==== Top scorers ====
Rank	Player	Club	Goals
1	(New Zealand) Greg Draper	The New Saints	21
2	(Wales) Eliot Evans	Cardiff Met.	14
3	(England) Wes Fletcher	The New Saints	13
4	(Wales) Kayne McLaggon	Barry Town United	12
5	(Wales) Adam Roscrow	Cardiff Met.	11
5	(Republic of Ireland) Declan Walker	Aberystwyth Town	11
5	(Wales) Michael Wilde	Connah's Quay Nomads	11
5	(England) Dean Rittenberg	Bangor City	11
9	(England) Mike Hayes	Bala Town	9
9	(England) Craig Hobson	Aberystwyth Town	9
