= Cymru North =

Association football league in Wales

- Founded: 2019
- Country: Wales
- Confederation: UEFA
- Number of clubs: 16
- Level on pyramid: 2
- Promotion to: Cymru Premier
- Relegation to: Ardal Leagues
- Domestic cup: Welsh Cup
- Current champions: Llandudno (1st title) (2025–26)
- Most championships: Colwyn Bay (2 titles)
- Broadcaster: S4C
- Website: cymrufootball.wales
- Current: 2026–27 Cymru North

The Cymru North is a regional football league in Wales (Welsh: Cymru), covering the northern half of the country. It initially had clubs with semi-professional status. Together with the Cymru South, it forms the second tier of the Welsh football league system.

The first year of its operation was 2019–20 with the Football Association of Wales owning and administering the tier 2 leagues for the first time. These changes followed from a review of the Welsh Football Pyramid. Prior to 2019, the equivalent league was the Cymru Alliance, covering North and Central Wales.

== Member clubs for the 2025–26 season ==
=== Stadia and locations ===
Locations of teams in the 2025–26 Cymru North.
Locations of teams in the 2025–26 Cymru North from Flintshire.

Team	Location	Stadium	Capacity	2024–25 season
Airbus UK Broughton	Broughton	The Airfield	1,600	2nd in Cymru North
Brickfield Rangers^{↑}	Wrexham	Clywedog Park	1,000	1st in Ardal NE
Buckley Town	Buckley	The Globe	1,000	5th in Cymru North
Caersws	Caersws	Recreation Ground	4,000	12th in Cymru North
Denbigh Town	Denbigh	Central Park	1,200	9th in Cymru North
Flint Mountain	Flint	Cae-y-Castell	3,000	7th in Cymru North
Gresford Athletic	Gresford	The Airfield, at Broughton	1,600	11th in Cymru North
Holyhead Hotspur^{↑}	Holyhead	The New Oval	1,000	2nd in Ardal NW
Holywell Town	Holywell	Halkyn Road	2,000	3rd in Cymru North
Llandudno	Llandudno	Maesdu Park	1,013	4th in Cymru North
Mold Alexandra	Mold	Alyn Park	3,000	8th in Cymru North
Newtown^{↓}	Newtown	Latham Park	5,000	11th in Cymru Premier
Penrhyncoch	Penrhyn-coch	Cae Baker	1,000	10th in Cymru North
Rhyl 1879^{↑}	Rhyl	Belle Vue	3,000	1st in Ardal NW
Ruthin Town	Ruthin	Memorial Playing Fields	2,000	13th in Cymru North

^{↓}	Relegated from the Cymru Premier
^{↑}	Promoted from the Ardal Leagues

== Champions ==
Seasons	Winners	Runners-up	Third place
2019-20	Prestatyn Town (1)	Flint Town United	Guilsfield
2020-21	Season cancelled due to COVID-19		
2021-22	Airbus UK Broughton (1)	Llandudno	Guilsfield
2022-23	Colwyn Bay (1)	Holywell Town	Llandudno
2023-24	Holywell Town (1)	Flint Town United	Airbus UK Broughton
2024-25	Colwyn Bay (2)	Airbus UK Broughton	Holywell Town
2025-26	Llandudno (1)	Airbus UK Broughton	Holywell Town

== Promoted to Cymru Premier ==
- 2019-20: Flint Town (runners-up)
- 2020-21: Competition cancelled
- 2021-22: Airbus UK Broughton
- 2022-23: Colwyn Bay
- 2023-24: Flint Town (runners-up)
- 2024-25: Colwyn Bay
- 2025-26: Llandudno, Airbus UK Broughton. Holywell Town

== Relegated into Cymru North from Cymru Premier ==
- 2019-20: Airbus UK Broughton
- 2020-21: Competition cancelled
- 2021-22: Cefn Druids
- 2022-23: Airbus UK Broughton and Flint Town United
- 2023-24: Colwyn Bay
- 2024-25: Newtown
- 2025-26: Bala Town

== Relegated from Cymru North ==
- 2019-20: Porthmadog, Corwen and Llanfair United
- 2020-21: Competition cancelled
- 2021-22: Llangefni Town, Llanrhaeadr and Bangor City
- 2022-23: Conwy Borough, Penrhyncoch and Holyhead Hotspur
- 2023-24: Porthmadog, Chirk AAA and Llanidloes Town
- 2024-25: Bangor 1876, Prestatyn Town and Llay Welfare
- 2025-26: None

== Promoted into Cymru North ==
- 2019-20: Llanidloes Town, Holyhead Hotspur and Holywell Town
- 2020-21: Competition cancelled
- 2021-22: Chirk, Mold Alexandra and Porthmadog
- 2022-23: Bangor 1876, Caersws and Denbigh Town
- 2023–24: Flint Mountain, Penrhyncoch and Llay Welfare
- 2024–25: Brickfield Rangers, Holyhead Hotspur and Rhyl 1879
- 2025-26: Bangor City 1876, Llanuwchllyn and Porthmadog

== See also ==
- List of association football competitions
- Welsh Football League
- Cymru Alliance
- Cymru South
- Cymru Leagues
