= Y Traeth =

- Interactive map of Y Traeth
- Location: Porthmadog, Gwynedd, Wales
- Coordinates: 52.9320°N 4.1204°W
- Owner: Porthmadog F.C.
- Capacity: 3,000
- Surface: Grass

Y Traeth (English: The Beach) is a multi-use stadium in Porthmadog, Wales. It is currently used mostly for football matches as the home ground of Porthmadog F.C. The stadium has a capacity of 3000 people, with 500 seated. The Traeth saw its largest crowd in recent years during the season 1993/4, when the last game of the season against Bangor City F.C. attracted more than 2,500 spectators.

Planning permission was granted in December 2009 for a new stand at the "Quarry End". The additional seating will allow the club to reach the required standard in order to attain the FAW's Domestic Licence; this is a requirement for all clubs in the Welsh Premier League.
