= Porthmadog F.C. =

Association football club in Wales

Porthmadog FC
- Full name: Clwb Pel Droed Porthmadog / Porthmadog Football Club
- Nickname: Port
- Founded: 1872; 154 years ago
- Ground: Y Traeth
- Capacity: 3,000 (800 seated)
- Chairman: Phil Jones
- Manager: Chris Jones
- League: Cymru North
- 2025–26: Ardal NW League, 2nd of 16 (promoted via play-offs)
- Website: www.porthmadogfc.com
Home colours	Away colours

Porthmadog Football Club (Welsh: Clwb Pêl Droed Porthmadog, also abbreviated Port) are a football team, playing in the Cymru North. The club was founded in 1872 and plays at Y Traeth, Porthmadog, which accommodates 3,000 spectators (800 seated).

== Management team ==
- Manager – Chris Jones
- Assistant Manager – Marc Seddon
- Coach – Graeme Seddon
- Coach – Carwyn Edwards
- First Aider - Alaw Evans

== Management board ==
- Chairman: Phil Jones
- Vice Chairman: Craig Hacking
- Director: Richard Jones
- Director: Richard Harvey
- Secretary: Chris Blanchard
- President: Dylan Rees

== History ==
=== Beginning ===
Porthmadog Football Club were founded in October 1872 (originally thought to be 1884 until the actual foundation date was discovered in November 2020) and played their first ever match against Pwllheli. The first captain of the club was Mr R Humphreys. This makes them one of Wales' oldest clubs. In 1900, the club joined the North Wales League, which it won the league in the 1902–03 season.

The 1950s–70s were successful decades for Port. The club won the Welsh Amateur Cup in 1955–56 and 1956–57. After losing its amateur status, and signing Mel Charles, the team had more success. In 1966, its played against Swansea City in the Welsh Cup and the replay at the Vetch attracted Swansea's largest crowd of the season, 10,941. Port then won the Welsh League (North) in five of the next nine years.

It was not until 1989–90 that Port had its next championship win, when it won the Daily Post Welsh Alliance. This was enough to ensure Port's place as inaugural members of the Cymru Alliance League in 1990. In 1992, Port became inaugural members of the League of Wales, then known as the Konica League.

=== League of Wales ===
The team struggled to make an impact on the pitch early in 1992–93 the season, but a late surge in the final months, thanks mainly to the signing of striker Dave Taylor, helped the team finish in a respectable ninth place and earned manager Meilyr Owen a manager of the month award. In his second season, Taylor went on to become both the league's and Europe's top scorer, earning him the European Golden Boot. During his spell at the club, he scored 62 goals in 66 games.

Despite the 70 goals netted by Taylor and Marc Lloyd-Williams, in the 1993–94 season, the team finished in eleventh. Port did, however, break another record—the biggest attendance in the League of Wales. A crowd of 3,250 came to see Bangor City push for the league title. Bangor City won the game 2–0 and therefore won the league and the right to play in Europe.

The third season started with a new manager, following the surprising decision to sack Owen. Ian Edwards, ex-Wales International, became manager, but after a good start, the team dropped from fourth position and he was also sacked. After Mickey Thomas, the former Manchester United, Wrexham and Wales player took over, the team continued to play poorly and was nearly relegated.

The fourth season started with another change of manager, as assistant Colin Hawkins was promoted to the job. While it was a quiet season on the field, events off the field were anything but quiet. The club nearly folded because of financial troubles but was re-launched as a limited company. £10,000 was raised through the sale of shares and extra money was raised through friendly matches, such as against Blackburn Rovers and a team of stars from S4C.

The financial situation improved in 1996–97, and the team started the season well, winning all home games until the New Year and losing to Barry Town by only one goal. One of Port's most influential players during the good start was Paul Roberts. Before leaving the club to join Wrexham for £10,000, Roberts had played for Wales Under-21 and was the league's top scorer. His chance to play for the Welsh youngsters came after he had scored for Port to beat them in a friendly match [Port 1–0 Wales U21].

After Roberts' departure, Port performed poorly and finished in tenth place. The season ended on a high note with a win against local rivals Caernarfon Town in the North Wales Coast Challenge Cup Final, following victories over Caernarfon Town and Colwyn Bay in earlier rounds.

The 1997–98 season was Port's final in the League of Wales. Despite looking safe at the end of April, a string losses in May proved too much for Port. On 2 May, at Farrar Road, Bangor, Port's destiny was decided by a match between Bangor City and Haverfordwest County. Port needed a Bangor win, but the final score was Bangor City 1, Haverfordwest County 2, and Port finished fourth from the bottom.

There was still a chance that the decision to relegate Port to the Cymru Alliance could be overturned, with legal action against the League of Wales considered. It was alleged that the decision to relegate four clubs was taken during the season and was therefore illegal. When Ebbw Vale was banned from the league, Port felt that the battle had been won. But Port was made to join the Cymru Alliance, when the south Wales club decided to appeal against the decision at the last minute.

=== Cymru Alliance ===
After occupying the second spot for most of the 1998–99 season, in the New Year it was reported that Port would not be promoted due to a lack of facilities. Port descended into a mid-table finish for the season. Port won the League Cup after beating Rhydymwyn in the final. The club finished in fifth place in the 1999–2000 season despite a run of victories after Viv Williams took charge following the departure of Hawkins. After another disappointing season in 2000–01, the club then took some positive steps forward in 2001–02, with Williams rebuilding the squad.

Port went on to have one of the most successful seasons in their history in 2002–03, winning every home game and losing only twice after securing promotion with a 3–2 victory away at Buckley. Port was promoted to the Welsh Premier with an advantage of 19 points at the top of the Cymru Alliance. Port was accused of playing Richard Harvey without international clearance after signing him from Cemaes Bay, but was found only technically guilty, as he had played in Wales for a year before being signed. Port went on to add two cups (North Wales Coast Challenge Cup and League Cups) to their haul.

=== Welsh Premier League ===
On 16 January 2007, Port was docked three Welsh Premier League points and fined £13,500 (£1,000 payable upfront with the remaining £12,500 suspended until 1 January 2008) after the Football Association of Wales charged the club with failing to control its supporters after racial abuse was directed at assistant referee Gary Ismail by an individual during the Welsh Premier League match against Cwmbran Town on 9 December 2006. The punishment led to outcry by followers of Welsh football—an on-line petition protesting against the punishment was signed by over 750 people from across Wales and worldwide. Porthmadog banned the individual from all matches at Y Traeth. The club's appeal to independent arbitrators was successful—the fine was slashed by £12,500 and the arbitrators ordered the Football Association of Wales to pay £4,000 towards the costs incurred by the club in having to take the matter so far. The arbitrators also decided that the decision to deduct three points should be reversed.

Porthmadog announced on 7 May 2007 that their management team— Osian Roberts and Viv Williams—were leaving the club. Roberts had just been appointed the Football Association of Wales's Technical Director of Football and could not devote enough time to the job, while Williams cited personal reasons. Former Wales and Manchester United star Clayton Blackmore, who signed for the club as a player earlier in the season, took over as manager but was sacked after three months due to a string of poor results. Following Blackmore's departure, Williams agreed to take over management again, initially on a temporary basis. Former Airbus UK Broughton assistant manager Alan Bickerstaff later agreed to join Williams as assistant manager.

The season continued poorly, especially at home, where Porthmadog failed to win a league game until the last day of the season against Rhyl. This win helped take Porthmadog out of the bottom two and into safety. Williams, as agreed, left Porthmadog and became manager at Llangefni, and Bickerstaff has since joined Rhyl.

Former player Paul Whelan was appointed the new manager in May 2008. After only eight months at the helm and with relegation looming, Whelan was replaced by former Welshpool manager Tomi Morgan. With the transfer-window already closed, Morgan was unable to augment the team, which eventually finished the season in sixteenth place, just above the two relegation places again. The goals of Marc Lloyd Williams, who re-signed for the club where he started his career, were the high points of a disappointing season, with the striker scoring 24 from 33 league starts.

The 2009–10 season saw Morgan make numerous changes to the squad and bring in many player from his former club. Despite the new squad, the team failed to make an impact on the pitch, finishing in fifteenth place with fewer points than the previous season. The FAW's decision to restructure the Welsh Premier by introducing the Super 12 for the season 2010–11 meant that Porthmadog, along with six others, was relegated to the Cymru Alliance League. Following Morgan's departure for Carmarthen Town during the close-season, the club appointed from within, with midfielder Gareth Parry taking over the reins in June 2010.

== Biggest victories and losses ==
- Biggest League of Wales win: 9–0 v Abergavenny Thursdays in 1993 and v Haverfordwest County in 1994.
- Biggest League of Wales defeat: 0–7 by Total Network Solutions in 2006.

== Honours ==
- Huws Gray Cup
  - Champions: 1998–99, 2002–03
- Cymru Alliance
  - Champions: 2002–03
- Welsh Amateur Cup
  - Champions: 1955–56, 1956–57
- Welsh League North
  - Champions: 1966–67, 1967–68, 1968–69
- Welsh Alliance
  - Champions: 1989–90
- Ardal Northwest
  - Runners-up: 2021–22, 2025–26
- Ardal North
  - Playoff – Winners: 2021–22, 2025–26
- Ardal North Cup
  - Winners: 2024–25
- Cambrian Coast Football League
  - Champions: 1919–20; 1959–60 (reserves); 1961–62 (reserves)

== Current squad ==
Note: Flags indicate national team as defined under FIFA eligibility rules; some limited exceptions apply. Players may hold more than one non-FIFA nationality.

No.	Pos.	Nation	Player
1	GK	WAL	Robbie Williams
13	GK	WAL	Dan Clark
21	DF	WAL	Morgan Owen
22	DF	WAL	Sam Thomas
5	DF	WAL	Josh Banks
3	DF	WAL	Gruff John
2	DF	WAL	Steffan Alford
23	DF	ENG	Dan Wood
20	DF	WAL	Gruff Ellis
18	DF	WAL	Cai Griffith
4	MF	WAL	Tom Mahoney
12	MF	WAL	Sam Reynolds

No.	Pos.	Nation	Player
14	MF	WAL	Rhys Alun Williams
8	MF	WAL	Ryan Williams
6	MF	WAL	Osian Ellis
17	MF	WAL	Cai Jones
24	MF	WAL	Caio Evans
7	MF	WAL	Sion Williams
15	MF	WAL	Jac Humphreys
9	FW	WAL	Gwion Dafydd
19	FW	WAL	Dylan Summers-Jones
10	FW	WAL	Luke Baum
16	FW	POR	Jonny Bravo
11	FW	WAL	Shaun Cavanagh

== Fans ==
Porthmadog are among the best supported clubs in the Cymru Alliance and also draw support from further afield with supporters clubs in Manchester and Leicestershire.
