= Caernarfon Town F.C. =

Association football club in Wales

Caernarfon Town
- Full name: Caernarfon Town Football Club; Clwb Pêl Droed Tref Caernarfon
- Nicknames: The Canaries, Cofis
- Founded: 1937; 89 years ago
- Ground: The Oval, Caernarfon
- Capacity: 3,000 (600 seated)
- Chairman: Paul Evans
- Manager: Richard Davies
- League: Cymru Premier
- 2025–26: Cymru Premier, 4th of 12
Home colours	Away colours

Caernarfon Town Football Club (Welsh: Clwb Pêl Droed Tref Caernarfon) is a professional Welsh football club based in Caernarfon, Gwynedd. They play in the Cymru Premier.

They are nicknamed "the Canaries" because of the club's yellow and green strip, a nickname that dates from 1895. Caernarfon Town plays at the Oval.

== History ==
=== The early years ===
The first known football club in the town of Caernarfon was Carnarvon Athletic, formed in 1876 and playing at various locations in the town before settling at the club's present ground, The Oval, in 1888.

Athletic went out of existence in 1893 but a new club, Caernarvon Ironopolis, was formed two years later reaching the semi finals of the Welsh Cup in 1900 and 1902 before disbanding following a dispute with the North Wales Coast League in 1903. Former players of the 'Nops' formed two new clubs, Caernarvon Colts and Caernarvon Royal Welch Fusiliers which came together in 1906 to form Caernarvon United.

After the Great War, United players came together to reform Caernarvon Athletic and the club enjoyed great success in the North Wales League as well as a famous victory over Darlington in the first round of the FA Cup in 1929. In 1930 the Club went into liquidation and, despite resurfacing a few years later, it soon disappeared again.

=== Caernarfon Town ===
In 1937 a group of football fans formed Caernarfon Town and, following many successful seasons in the Welsh League North, the club was granted permission by the Football Association of Wales to apply for membership of the Lancashire Combination in 1980. The Canaries won the Championship in 1981 before the league merged with the Cheshire County League to form the North West Counties Football League. In 1985 Caernarfon Town were runners up in the First Division of the North West Counties League and were elected to the Northern Premier League. The 1986–87 season saw the Canaries enjoy their best ever season when, under manager, John King, they defeated Stockport County and York City in the FA Cup, before going out to Second Division Barnsley following a third round replay. Caernarfon finished third in the Northern Premier League for consecutive seasons, arguably their best ever standing.

In 1995, the Caernarfon Town board of directors voted to join the recently formed League of Wales. In 1999–2000 the Canaries were relegated but they bounced straight back winning the Cymru Alliance the following season.

=== 2013–present ===
On 13 April 2013, Caernarfon Town made their way to Latham Park, Newtown, to face Kilvey Fords FC of Swansea in the 2012–13 FAW Trophy Final. They won the match 6–0 and it was their first FAW Trophy since 1978. The victory against the Swansea Senior League outfit is the biggest final winning-margin in the competition's 123-year history. They also gained promotion to the Huws Gray Cymru Alliance during the 2012–13 by finishing top of the Welsh Alliance, taking 66 points from 28 games. On 24 September 2022 Caernarfon Town and The New Saints were invited to play in the Scottish SPFL Trust Cup, they would be drawn away to Clyde FC but were beaten 1–0 at New Douglas Park. On 18 May 2024 Caernarfon Town secured European football for the first time in their history by defeating Penybont FC in the Cymru Premier Play-offs final to secure spot in 2024–25 UEFA Europa Conference League. The team entered in the first qualifying round and played against Crusaders from Northern Ireland. After a 2–0 home win in the first leg, Caernarfon lost 1–3 after extra time in the return leg, leading to a 3–3 aggregate. Caernarfon advanced to the next round by winning the penalty shootout 8–7. In the second qualifying round, Caernarfon faced Legia Warsaw from Poland, losing 0–6 away and 0–5 at home, resulting in a 0–11 aggregate and their elimination from the competition.

For the 2025–26 season, Caernarfon temporarily played their home games at Maesdu Park, the home ground of JD Cymru North team Llandudno F.C., whilst their stadium The Oval was given a major renovation.

In the same season, Caernarfon won the Welsh Cup for the first time in their history, beating Flint Town United 3–0 in the final at Newport's Rodney Parade and securing UEFA Conference League football for the second time in three seasons.

== Rivalries ==
Caernarfon Town's main rivalries are with Porthmadog, Bangor City and Rhyl.

== Logo change ==
As of April 2026, Caernarfon Town Football Club has unveiled its new club crest following an extensive period of consultation with supporters. Three separate fan consultations were held between 2023 and 2025, culminating in a final decision made in front of supporters at the beginning of 2026. The new crest will appear on team shirts from the 2026/27 season, marking the beginning of a new chapter for the club, competing in the UEFA Conference League and returning to its home ground, The Oval. While the previous crest held significant sentimental value for many supporters, Chairman Paul Evans explained the reasoning behind the redesign:

"We felt we needed a modern new crest that accurately represents us as a club today. We believe we’re the most Welsh club in World football and this new design, incorporating the Owain Glyndŵr dragon and sword, reflects our history, heritage and identity. We have worked closely with the supporters to create the crest and are excited to finally be able to reveal it. We hope everyone likes it."

The process behind the new identity was guided by a desire to create a crest suited to the modern era while remaining rooted in the club's traditions. Drawing inspiration from the previous design, the new crest was developed to be bold, enduring and uniquely representative of the club's Welsh identity, with supporters remaining central to every stage of the process.

== Honours ==
=== League ===
- Cymru Alliance
  - Champions (3): 2000–01, 2015–16, 2017–18
  - Runners-up (2): 2014–15, 2016–17
- Welsh League North
  - Champions (4): 1946–47, 1965–66, 1977–78, 1978–79
  - Runners–up (3): 1956–57, 1957–58, 1972–73
- Lancashire Combination
  - Champions (1): 1981–82
- North West Counties Football League
  - Division One – Runners-up (1): 1984–85
  - Division Two – Runners-up (1): 1982–83
- Welsh Alliance League
  - Champions (1): 2012–13
  - Runners-up (1): 1990–91 (reserves)

=== Cups ===
- Welsh Cup
  - Winners (1): 2025–26
- FAW Intermediate Cup/ FAW Trophy
  - Winners (2): 1977–78, 2012–13
- Cymru Alliance League Cup
  - Winners (4): 2000–01, 2013–14, 2015–16, 2016–17
- Lancashire Combination Cup
  - Winners (1): 1980–81

== European record ==
Season	Competition	Round	Club	Home	Away	Aggregate
2024–25	UEFA Conference League	1Q	(Northern Ireland) Crusaders	2–0	1–3 (a.e.t.)	3–3 (8–7 p)
2024–25	UEFA Conference League	2Q	(Poland) Legia Warsaw	0−5	0–6	0–11
2026–27	UEFA Conference League	1Q	(Estonia) FCI Levadia	0−5	0–5	0–10

Notes

- 1Q: First qualifying round
- 2Q: Second qualifying round

== Current squad ==
As of 2 October 2026

Note: Flags indicate national team as defined under FIFA eligibility rules; some limited exceptions apply. Players may hold more than one non-FIFA nationality.

No.	Pos.	Nation	Player
1	GK	WAL	Connor Roberts
3	DF	WAL	Mathew Jones
4	DF	ENG	Jordan Piggott
5	DF	ENG	Phil Mooney
6	MF	ENG	Jake Canavan
7	MF	POR	Paulo Mendes
8	MF	WAL	Danny Gosset
9	FW	ENG	Zack Clarke
10	FW	WAL	Osian Evans
11	FW	POL	Adrian Cieślewicz
13	GK	WAL	Hari Thomas
14	MF	WAL	Noah Edwards

No.	Pos.	Nation	Player
15	DF	WAL	Dominic Smith
16	DF	ENG	Ben Nash
17	GK	WAL	Jac Williams
18	MF	IRL	Harry Charsley
19	MF	WAL	Siôn Bradley
21	MF	ENG	Simba Nyamwanza
23	DF	WAL	Chris Marriott
25	FW	CGO	Offrande Zanzala
27	DF	WAL	Ryan Sears (captain)
39	MF	WAL	Harri Wyn
53	DF	WAL	Caron Williams

=== Out on loan ===
Note: Flags indicate national team as defined under FIFA eligibility rules; some limited exceptions apply. Players may hold more than one non-FIFA nationality.

No.	Pos.	Nation	Player
2	DF	WAL	Morgan Owen (at Porthmadog)
28	MF	WAL	Osian Ellis (at Porthmadog)

No.	Pos.	Nation	Player
30	MF	WAL	Charlie Griffith (at Pwllheli)
