= Prestatyn Town F.C. =

Association football club in Wales

Prestatyn Town
- Full name: Prestatyn Town Football Club
- Nickname: The Seasiders
- Founded: 1910; 116 years ago
- Ground: Bastion Road; Prestatyn
- Capacity: 2,300 (200 seated)
- Chairman: James Benbow
- Manager: Aden Shannon
- League: Ardal NW League
- 2025–26: Ardal NW League, 4th of 16
- Website: https://www.prestatyntownfc.com/
Home colours	Away colours	Third colours

Prestatyn Town Football Club (Welsh: Clwb Pêl Droed Tref Prestatyn) is a Welsh professional football club based in Prestatyn, Denbighshire. They play in the Ardal NW League.

== History ==
=== Early years ===
Records show that football has been played in Prestatyn since the early 1890s with games being played on an undeveloped field on Marine Road. Other pitches around the town were also utilised but by the 1930s when the club settled on Bastion Road ground behind what is now the Central Beach Club.

The early history of Prestatyn Football Club is somewhat sketchy as there were many teams who lasted just a couple of seasons before folding. Prestatyn Town played their first game on 20 October 1910 when they travelled to Rhyl Amateurs, winning 3–2. One Prestatyn side did enjoy some form of longevity, winning the North Wales Coast FA Junior Cup in 1928–29. At the time Sam Bennett, who was manager, carried out training, acted as club linesman, headed up the committee and also supplied match reports to the local press.

Although never one of North Wales' football's leading lights in the pre and inter-war era, Prestatyn attracted their share of noted players including left back Alf Smith never disclosed his age to anyone but had a long and distinguished career with the club before hanging up his boots after a spell with Penmaenmawr. Other names included George Drummond, an old-fashioned wing-half, winger-cum-centre forward Roger Jones, who had also played for Rhyl in the Birmingham League. Also there were the Roberts brothers, Alf and George and 'Cunnie' Jones who left Prestatyn to become a centre-half with Rhyl.

For a time in the late 1940s the club adopted the name Chandypore FC (the original name of the above-mentioned Central Beach Club) when they operated in the Dyserth Area League but quickly reverted to Prestatyn Town and, apart from sponsor's names (Prestatyn Town Nova in 1990) have remained so ever since. Success in these early days was in short supply, the only triumph of any note being the capture of the North Wales Coast FA Junior Cup in 1928–29.

=== 1960s to 1980s ===
In the late 1960s the old Bastion Road ground was swallowed up by housing and after considering using a pitch in the middle of the old Prestatyn Raceway, now the site of Pontin's Holiday Village, the club moved to their present headquarters off Bastion Gardens in 1970–71 season. For most of this period the club were members of either the Dyserth Area League or the Welsh League North. After becoming founder members of the Clwyd Football League in 1974–75 Prestatyn enjoyed immediate success under the charge of manager Eaton Woodfine, winning the inaugural and subsequent titles and a host of cups along the way until, after finishing runners-up to St Asaph City in 1992–93, they decided to join the Welsh Alliance League.

=== 1990s ===
During the 1993–94 season, under the management of former Queen of the South professional Eddie Garrett, the club finished in eighth place but won the Alves Cup for the first time, beating St Asaph in the final at Connahs Quay. Prestatyn's captain Martin Trigg was the goalscorer. The following season saw the club set up an end-of-season run of 14 straight wins to finish just four points behind champions Rhydymwyn. They also reached the semi-final of the Alves Cup while the reserve team won the Clwyd League's Clwyd Cup.

The 1995–96 season saw the club chasing eventual champions Denbigh Town all the way, finishing in second place but this time only three points behind. In this season Town completed work on their clubhouse which meant they now had their own entirely self-contained base.

There was an acrimonious split at the club in 1998–99 which led to the formation of Prestatyn Nova and Town resigning from the Welsh Alliance to re-join the Clwyd League. This move was not the backward step many detractors feared, under the leadership of Tony Thackeray and Gwyn Jones, the club completed a Clwyd League treble of championship, Premier Cup and President's Cup while the reserves reached the final of the Coast FA Junior Cup, losing on penalties to Abergele Celts.

The club re-joined the Welsh Alliance the next year, finishing seventh and again winning the Alves Cup while the reserves won the Clwyd League's REM Jones Cup. 2001–02 saw Prestatyn appoint Graham Hunter as manager and Tony Thackeray became club chairman. They were runners-up in the Alves Cup and the reserves retained the REM Jones Cup. 2002–03 saw managerial changes again when Paul Thomas and James Ainsworth took over the reins.

=== 2000s ===
There was change again for 2003–04 season when Jim Hackett and Steve Jones took over and the transformation was immediate, the club finished third and just missed promotion to the Cymru Alliance.

Hackett left for a job at Chester City after a year and 2004–05 was a season of mixed fortune under the management of Lennie Dunster and Martyn Jones. The team eventually finished sixth but did reach the final of the NWCFA Challenge Cup for the first time, losing 3–0 to Bangor City at Llandudno.

2005–06 was the season that really marked an upturn in Prestatyn's fortunes when, under the chairmanship of Steven Jones, Town appointed Dave Fuller as player-manager and retained Martyn Jones as assistant. The policy to concentrate on the league title paid off with the team winning the Welsh Alliance title for the first time and remaining unbeaten all season and ending up nine points clear of runners-up Denbigh Town.

There was also a rewarding run in the Welsh Cup which ended in a narrow 2–1 defeat to Welsh Premier club Carmarthen Town in front of 268 people at Bastion Road. The season also saw the reserves, under manager Sean Pritchard, finish third in the Clwyd League's Premier Division and winning the President's Cup by beating Llandyrnog 5–2 at Halkyn United.

Off the field the new clubhouse extension was completed along with a new seated stand and hard standing around the pitch to comply with the requirements of the Cymru Alliance and in their first season, Fuller – now assisted by Neil Gibson – finished fourth and reached the final of the CAL League Cup and the NWCFA Challenge Cup. Fuller stood down in the close season with Gibson taking over as player-manager for 2007–08 and with the majority of the squad staying, the push for Welsh Premier football was successful with the team finishing as runaway champions.

Following the granting of planning permission in late April, the club erected floodlights and carried out further stadium improvements to meet the Welsh Premier League's ground grading deadline on 1 May.

=== Promotion to the Welsh Premier League ===
After winning the league title in 2007–08, the club was promoted to the Welsh Premier League for the 2008–09 season. Their promotion was dependent on their ground, Bastion Road, meeting certain criteria, meaning that stadium had to be upgraded by 1 May 2008. The club installed floodlights and their promotion to the Welsh Premier League was ratified. The club maintained Premier League status for a second season with a 15th-place finish in 2008–09.

=== Welsh Cup winners and European football ===
Under the guidance of chairman Phil Merrick and CEO Leigh Williams, the club had its most successful season in 2012–13. This was down to manager Neil Gibson's ability to attract and coach ex-professional players such as Andy Parkinson and Jason Price. They beat champions The New Saints for the first time and it was also the first time they had ever been top of the Welsh Premier League. They won the NWCFA Challenge Cup and beat local rivals Bangor City 3-1 after extra-time to win the Welsh Cup Final at the Racecourse, Wrexham. They then went on to make Welsh football history by being the first Welsh club to reach the second qualifying round of the UEFA Europa League at the first attempt. In the first qualifying round they beat Latvian side Liepajas Metalurgs to then go on and play HNK Rijeka at Kantrida Stadium. Captain Dave Hayes led out the team in front of 10,000 fans.

=== Stagnation and relegation from the top tier ===
As the 2013–14 season began, there were multiple players leaving the club to pastures new and as a result, the performance of the club for the next couple of years started to deteriorate, but at the end of the season they survived relegation with an 11th-place finish. In the 2014–15 season the club were ultimately relegated with a 12th-place finish and no mathematical chance of surviving, their relegation was confirmed as Llandudno were promoted from the Cymru Alliance, ending a seven-year stint in Wales's top division.

=== Promotion followed by immediate relegation ===
The 2016–17 season saw the club gain promotion back to the Welsh Premier League. The club's return to the top tier did not however go as planned with the team struggling to pick up results after November. Neil Gibson departed mid-season to take up a coaching role with Connah's Quay Nomads, and caretaker manager Gareth Wilson was unable to help the club avoid relegation.

=== Back in the second tier ===
The summer of 2018 began in crisis. A mass exodus of the playing staff due to off-the-field issues saw the club not only in need of a manager, but an entire squad of players. In stepped the management duo of Leon Field and Ryan Turner from lower league side Kinmel Bay. The duo had their work cut out, and their first action was to promote a number of the club's youth prospects from Prestatyn's title-winning reserve side. A number of promising signings followed. Dave Fuller returned as director of football, and following a successful pre-season - former captain Dave Hayes came out of retirement to help steady things on the field. Alex Jones was named club captain, and former striker Ian Griffiths returned to bring experience and goals.

Long-serving chairman Chris Tipping sold the club to an investment consortium two months into the 2018–19 season, and a change in management followed as Neil Gibson returned to manage the club in October - with Ryan Turner assuming the role of assistant manager. Results in the league steadily improved thanks to Gibson's influence helping secure the return of a few key players from the last title-winning squad. A run of six games unbeaten with five wins - including a Boxing Day demolishing of fierce rivals Rhyl FC - all but secured their Cymru Alliance status, with the club eyeing a promotion push the following season.

=== Cymru North champions but no promotion ===
The 2019–20 season saw the Cymru Alliance rebranded as the Cymru North (along with the WPL as the Cymru Premier in a mass rebrand) and this also saw the club record their best season in the Cymru North with 3 separate 7-0 wins against Bangor City, Llanfair United and away at Conwy Borough, unfortunately the season was cut short in March due to the outbreak of the COVID-19 Worldwide Pandemic (which later stopped that season's Welsh Cup which the club had progressed to a semi final game against The New Saints), despite Prestatyn Town winning the Cymru North on the PPG (Points-Per-Game) System implemented by the FAW across the Welsh football pyramid, they weren't granted promotion due to their TV Gantry being up to FAW standards. As a result, Flint Town United took their spot in the Cymru Premier for the 2020–21 season with the club taking on another season in the Cymru North as league champions.

During the off-season, Neal Colakoglu that led the consortium to buy club from Tipping, announced he was selling the club to investor Jamie Welsh. Changes were made as a result in the board with the additions of Leigh Williams as the club's CEO (who would later step down) and Mike Mainwaring as the club secretary.

In 2026, Prestatyn employed two new experienced coaches, Manager Aden Shannon and his assistant Jonny Hill from Flint United. At Flint United, they won promotion from the third tier and along with the NEWFA CUP. Jonny Hill is a EX Cymru premier player and also played in other Welsh leagues .

== Ground ==
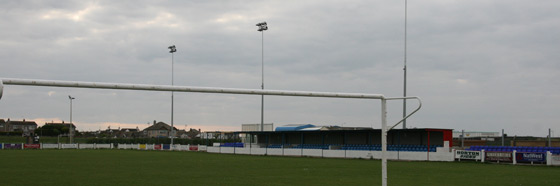
Bastion Gardens

The club plays at Bastion Gardens, also known as Bastion Road. It was opened in 1969 as a replacement for their previous ground at the rear of the Central Beach Club. The ground has also been used by Bow, and since 2025 it has been used by Flint Mountain.

== Players ==
=== First team squad ===
As of February 2025

Note: Flags indicate national team as defined under FIFA eligibility rules; some limited exceptions apply. Players may hold more than one non-FIFA nationality.

No.	Pos.	Nation	Player
1	GK	ENG	Robbie Williams
2	DF	ENG	Lewis Rhodes
3	DF	ENG	Daniel Wright
4	DF	WAL	James Jones
5	DF	WAL	Zebb Edwards
6	MF	WAL	Matty Robinson
7	MF	WAL	Tyler Joyce
8	MF	WAL	Alex Jones
9	MF	WAL	Robbie Parry
10	FW	WAL	Rob Hughes

No.	Pos.	Nation	Player
11	MF	WAL	Sam Ashton
13	GK	WAL	Dylan Oliver-Taylor
15	FW	ENG	Tom Cain
16	FW	WAL	Casey Faulkner
17	MF	WAL	Leon Atkins
18	MF	WAL	Leigh Craven
19	FW	ENG	Macauley Taylor
20	MF	WAL	James Stead
21	FW	WAL	Tom Weir
22	DF	WAL	Connor Whelan

== Managers ==
- Eaton Woodfine (1974–1985)
- Phil Merrick (1985–88)
- Ricky Westwell (1990–1993)
- Eddie Garrett (1993–1996)
- Geraint Jones and Steve Lewis (1996–1997)
- John Woods (1997–1998)
- Allan Bickerstaff (1998)
- Martin Trigg (1998–1999)
- Tony Thackeray and Gwyn Jones (1998–1999)
- Tony Thackeray (1999–2001)
- Graham Hunter (2001–2002)
- Graham Hunter and Tony Palfreyman (2002–2003)
- Paul Thomas and James Ainsworth (2002–2003)
- Jim Hackett and Steve Jones (2003–2004)
- Lennie Dunster and Martyn Jones (2004–2005)
- Dave Fuller (Player/ Manager 2005–2007)
- Neil Gibson (2007–2011)
- Lee Jones (2011–2012)
- Neil Gibson (2012–2018)
- Gareth Wilson (2018)
- Leon Field and Ryan Turner (2018)
- Neil Gibson (2018–2020)
- John Lawless (2020)
- Ryan Turner (2020–2021)
- Ben Heath (2021)
- Andrew Ruscoe & Paddy Hamid [Caretakers] (2021–2022)
- Andrew Ruscoe (2022)
- Chris Jones (2022–2023)
- Matty Roberts (2023–2024)
- Gareth Thomas (2024–2026)

• Aden Shannon (2026-

== Honours ==
- Cymru North
  - Winners: 2019–20
- Cymru Alliance League
  - Winners: 2016–17
- Welsh Cup
  - Winners: 2012–13
- Alves Cup
  - Winners: 1993–94, 1999–2000
  - Runners-up: 2000–01
- Barritt Cup
  - Runners-up: 1996–97, 2006–07
- Clwyd Premier League
  - Winners: 1974–75, 1975–76, 1982–83, 1983–84, 1998–99, 2006–07
  - Runners-up: 1992–93
- OCS Premier Division Merit Award
  - Winners: 1985–86
- Clwyd League Division One
  - Winners: 1991–92
  - Runners-up: 1980–81
- Clwyd League Division Two
  - Winners: 1989–90, 1993–94
- Clwyd Premier Cup
  - Winners: 1974–75, 1975–76, 1981–82, 1983–84, 1998–99
- Clwyd President's Cup
  - Winners: 1983–84, 1998–99, 2005–06
- Edin Hughes Award
  - Winners: 1984–85
- Cymru Alliance League
  - Winners: 2007–08
- Cymru Alliance League Cup
  - Runners-up: 2006–07
- Dyserth Area League
  - Winners: 1971–72, 1972–73, 1973–74
- NWCFA Challenge Cup
  - Winners: 2012–13
  - Runners-up: 1983–84, 2006–07
- NWCFA Junior Cup
  - Winners: 1928–29
  - Runners-up: 2006–07
- REM Jones Cup
  - Winners: 1994–95, 1999–2000, 2000–01
- Welsh Alliance League
  - Winners: 2005–06
  - Runners-up: 1994–95, 1995–96

== European record ==
Season	Competition	Round	Club	Home	Away	Aggregate
2013–14	UEFA Europa League	First qualifying round	(Latvia) Liepājas Metalurgs	1–2	2–1	3–3 (4–3p)
2013–14	UEFA Europa League	Second qualifying round	(Croatia) Rijeka	0–3	0–5	0–8
