= Guilsfield F.C. =

Association football club in Wales

Guilsfield
- Full name: Guilsfield Football Club
- Nickname: The Guils
- Founded: 1957; 69 years ago
- Ground: Clos Mytton; Guilsfield
- Coordinates: 52.693825°N 3.158934°W
- Manager: Gavin Allen
- League: Cymru North
- 2025–26 ]: Cymru North, 6th of 16
Home colours	Away colours

Guilsfield Football Club is a football team, founded in 1957 in Guilsfield, near Welshpool, Wales. Guilsfield play in the Cymru North.

== History ==
A team was founded in Guilsfield by a Mr A.C. Perkins in October 1879.

== Honours ==
- Montgomeryshire Football League Division One – Champions: 1936–37, 1994–95, 2018–19 (reserves), 2019–20 (reserves)
- Montgomeryshire Football League Division Two – Champions: 1987–88
- Cymru Alliance League Cup – Winners: 2010–11
- Cymru Alliance League Cup – Finalists: 2014–15
- Central Wales Challenge Cup – Winners: 2005–06, 2013–14, 2022–23, 2023–24, 2024–25
- Central Wales Challenge Cup – Finalists: 2017–18
- Llansantffraid Village Cup – Winners: 2017–18 (reserves), 2018–19 (reserves)
