= Penrhyncoch F.C. =

Association football club in Wales

Coordinates: 52.4390°N 3.9955°W

Penrhyncoch
- Full name: Penrhyncoch Football Club
- Nickname: The Roosters
- Founded: 1965; 61 years ago
- Ground: Cae Baker; Penrhyn-coch
- Capacity: 250 seated (700 standing)
- Chairman: Martin Harries
- Manager: Gari Lewis
- League: Cymru North
- 2025–26: Cymru North, 12th of 16
- Website: penrhyncochfc.com
Home colours	Away colours

Penrhyncoch Football Club (Welsh: Clwb Pêl Droed Penrhyncoch) is a semi-professional football club based in Penrhyn-coch, Ceredigion, Wales. They currently play in the Cymru North.

The club was founded in 1965 and have played at their current home ground, Cae Baker, since its founding.

== Squad ==
As of 5 September 2026

The listed players were confirmed by the club for the 2025–26 season.

Note: Flags indicate national team as defined under FIFA eligibility rules; some limited exceptions apply. Players may hold more than one non-FIFA nationality.

No.	Pos.	Nation	Player
1	GK	WAL	Leigh Jenkins
2		WAL	William Evans
3	DF	WAL	Taylor Richardson
4	MF	WAL	Cai Thomas
5	MF	WAL	Iestyn Duggan
6		WAL	Solomon Watkin
7	FW	ENG	Geoff Kellaway (captain)
8	MF	ENG	Christy Gale
9	FW	POL	Jakub Michalski

No.	Pos.	Nation	Player
10	MF	FRA	Marcus Yakou
11	FW	ENG	Zac Davies
12	DF	WAL	Sion James (player/ co-assistant manager)
14	DF	WAL	Rhydian Davies
15	MF	WAL	Isaac Aldred
16	DF	WAL	Llyr Hughes (player/ co-assistant manager)
17		WAL	Steffan Davies
19	DF	WAL	Kieran Booker
20		WAL	Guto Gwenallt

== Staff ==
Position	Name
Chairman	(Wales) Martin Harries
Secretary	(Wales) Sarah Thomas
Manager	(Wales) Gari Lewis
Assistant Manager	(Wales) Aneurin Thomas
First Team Coach	(Wales) Iwan Roberts

== Honours ==
- Cymru Alliance
  - League Cup winners: 1998
- Central Wales Challenge Cup
  - Winners: 2003, 2012
- Mid Wales League
  - Champions; 2001–02, 2002–03, 2015–16
  - League Cup winners: 2000, 2001, 2015–16
  - Summer Cup winners: 2002, 2003
- North Cards Cup
  - Winners: 1974, 1977, 1978, 1980, 2000, 2001
- South Cards Cup
  - Winners: 1971, 1974, 1975, 1976, 1977, 1980, 1982
- Aberystwyth and District League
  - Champions: 1971–72, 1974–75, 1975–76, 1976–77, 1977–78, 1997–98, 1998–99, 2005–06, 2011–12
  - Division Two Champions: 1985–86, 2003–04, 2004–05
  - League Cup Winners: 1970, 1974, 1998, 1999, 2002, 2004, 2005
- Ceredigion League
  - Ceredigion Cup Winners: 1979
- Len & Julia Newman Cup
  - Winners: 1997, 1998, 2001
- Ardal North East League
  - Winners: 2024
- FAW Trophy
  - Runners up: 1996, 2024
