= List of Bangor City F.C. seasons =

This is a list of seasons played by Bangor City Football Club in English, European and Welsh football, from 1877 (when the club, then known simply as Bangor F.C., first entered the Welsh Cup) to the most recent season.

== Seasons ==
=== The Little Giants ===
Based at the Maes-y-Dref ground Bangor Football Club was formed in December 1876. During this time the only competition for the new club were friendlies until the formation of the new Welsh Cup in 1877. Bangor's first copetetive game would be against Caernarvon Athletic. Bangor left the field while trailing to Newtown WS 3–1. The reason being a Newtown WS player struck a Bangor player and a fight broke out. Both teams complained to the FAW while claiming the match, (Bangor for foul play and Newtown WS for leading the game when the fight broke out). The FAW ordered a replay to which Bangor refused and withdrew from the FAW^{♥} . After the Northern Welsh Football Association collapsed Bangor returned to the FAW^{♦} . Bangor Dismissed^{♣} .

Season	League									Welsh Cup	FA Cup	Other	Europe	Top goalscorer	
Season	Division	P	W	D	L	F	A	Pts	Pos	Welsh Cup	FA Cup	Other	Europe	Name	Goals
1877–78										SF					
1878–79										R3^{[♥]}					
1879–80												Northern Welsh FA Cup – Winners			
1880–81															
1881–82															
1882–83															
1883–84															
1884–85										R2^{[♦]}					
1885–86										SF					
1886–87										SF					
1887–88										R2					
1888–89										Winners					
1889–90										SF					
1890–91										R2^{[♣]}					
1891–92										R3					
1892–93										R2					
1893–94	NWCL	11	4	3	4	26	32	11	3rd	R1					
1894–95	NWCL	10	2	4	4	17	18	8	4th	R4		North Wales Coast Senior Cup and North West Wales Challenge Cup			
1895–96	NWCL	10	7	2	1	26	11	16	1st	Winners					
1896–97	NWCL	10	7	2	1	34	12	16	2nd	R4					
1897–98	NWCL	10	5	1	4	30	17	11	3rd	R2					
1898–99	Combination	28	12	6	10	63	78	30	7th	R4					
1899–1900	Combination	16	8	1	7	37	36	17	4th	R4					
1900–01	Combination	22	13	3	6	62	45	29	4th	R4					
1901–02	Combination	26	11	5	10	51	74	27	6	R2					
1902–03	Combination	26	9	8	9	53	72	24	9th	R4					
1903–04	Combination	24	12	2	10	60	55	26	6th	R4					
1904–05	Combination	26	8	3	15	55	61	19	12th	R4					
1905–06	Combination	28	9	6	13	38	63	24	10th	R4					
1906–07	Combination	26	8	5	13	36	51	21	10th	R3					
1907–08	Combination	26	8	3	15	38	68	19	9th	R3					
1908–09	Combination	30	13	6	11	71	81	32	7th	R2					
1909–10	Combination	30	16	3	11	79	66	35	5th	R3					
1910–11	Combination	20	12	3	5	72	38	27	2nd	R4					
1911–12	n/a									R4					
1912–13	NWA	26	16	1	9	92	48	33	5th	PR					
1913–14	NWA									R4					
1914–15	n/a									R3					
No competitive football was played between 1915 and 1919 due to the First World War
1919–20	NWCL	18	13	2	3	69	26	28	1st	n/a					
1920–21	NWCL	22	11	4	7	64	60	26	4th	R2					
1921–22	WNL									R3					
1922–23	WNL									??					
1923–24	WNL									R5					
1924–25	WNL									R3					
1925–26	WNL									R4					
1926–27	WNL									R3					
1927–28	WNL									Runner's-up					
1928–29	WNL									R6					
1929–30	WNL									R3					
1930–31	NWFC	18	11	2	5	55	34	24	2nd	R3					
1931–32	NWFC	16	5	2	9	42	55	12	7th	R3					
1932–33	B'HAM	34	15	7	12	76	59	37	5th	R8					
1933–34	B'HAM	38	20	4	14	84	62	44	9th	SF					
1934–35	B'HAM	36	10	7	19	62	100	27	14th	R6					
1935–36	B'HAM	38	15	4	19	83	97	34	12th	R7					
1936–37	B'HAM	36	18	3	15	80	81	39	8th	R6					
1937–38	B'HAM	26	10	5	11	42	57	25	8th	R3					
1938–39	LANC	42	27	7	8	126	75	61	2nd	R4					
1939–40	n/a									R4					
No competitive football was played between 1939 and 1946 due to the Second World War
1946–47	LANC	40	14	9	17	84	94	37	15th	R5					
1947–48	LANC	42	14	8	20	62	77	36	14th	R7					
1948–49	LANC	42	18	10	14	75	71	46	7th	R5		Lancashire Combination Cup – Winners			
1949–50	LANC	42	18	9	15	96	70	45	7th	R7					
1950–51	CCL	42	20	8	14	85	70	48	7th	R6					
1951–52	CCL	42	17	9	16	79	68	43	11th	R5	R1				
1952–53	CCL	42	23	7	12	87	68	53	5th	R4	R1				
1953–54	CCL	42	23	7	12	104	63	53	2nd	R7					
1954–55	CCL	42	16	7	19	78	96	39	15th	R5					
1955–56	CCL	42	13	7	22	71	107	33	17th	R4					
1956–57	CCL	42	10	8	24	73	115	28	21st	R4					
1957–58	CCL	42	19	11	12	81	68	49	8th	R5					
1958–59	CCL	38	22	5	11	85	61	49	2nd	SF					
1959–60	CCL	38	18	6	14	86	58	42	7th	SF					
1960–61	CCL	42	22	8	12	103	65	52	6th	Runner's-up	R2				
1961–62	CCL	42	15	11	16	86	86	41	10th	Winners					
1962–63	CCL	42	13	16	13	71	68	42	13th	R6			UEFA Cup Winners' Cup – R1		
1963–64	CCL	42	21	9	12	75	55	51	4th	Runner's-up	R1				
1964–65	CCL	42	25	4	13	94	58	54	4th	R5	R1				
1965–66	CCL	42	24	6	12	91	67	54	4th	SF					
1966–67	CCL	42	20	8	14	90	77	48	7th	R6	R1				
1967–68	CCL	42	24	9	9	99	61	57	3rd	R5					

=== Alliance ===
Season	League									Welsh Cup	FA Cup	Other	Europe	Top goalscorer	
Season	Division	P	W	D	L	F	A	Pts	Pos	Welsh Cup	FA Cup	Other	Europe	Name	Goals
1968–69	NPL	38	18	9	11	102	64	45	6th	R6	R1				
1969–70	NPL	38	15	9	14	68	63	39	8th	R5	R2	FA Trophy – R3			
1970–71	NPL	42	19	10	13	72	61	48	7th	R6	R1	FA Trophy – R3			
1971–72	NPL	46	20	8	18	93	74	48	9th	R6	R1	FA Trophy – R1			
1972–73	NPL	46	16	13	17	70	60	45	13th	Runner's-up	R2	FA Trophy – QF			
1973–74	NPL	46	19	11	16	65	56	49	9th	R4	4QR	FA Trophy – R1			
1974–75	NPL	46	13	9	24	56	67	35	19th	R5	4QR	FA Trophy – R1			
1975–76	NPL	46	21	12	13	80	70	54	8th	R3	2QR	FA Trophy – R1			
1976–77	NPL	44	22	11	11	87	52	55	4th	R5	4QR	FA Trophy – R2			
1977–78	NPL	46	26	10	10	92	50	62	3rd	Runner's-up	4QR	FA Trophy – R3			
1978–79	NPL	44	15	14	15	65	66	44	12th	R4	PR	FA Trophy – R1; Conference League Cup – R1	Anglo-Italian Cup – R1		
1979–80	APL	38	14	14	10	41	46	42	9th	R4	PR	FA Trophy – R2			
1980–81	APL	38	6	12	20	35	68	24	20th	R5	1QR	FA Trophy – SF			
1981–82	NPL ↑	42	27	8	7	108	60	62	1st	SF	2QR	FA Trophy – R1			
1982–83	APL	42	14	13	15	71	77	55	13th	R4	1QR	FA Trophy – R3			
1983–84	APL	42	10	6	26	54	82	29	21st	R4	R2	FA Trophy – Runners-up			
1984–85	NPL	42	17	9	16	70	61	60	10th	Runner's-up	R1	FA Trophy – R2			
1985–86	NPL	42	13	15	14	51	51	54	13th	R2	4QR	FA Trophy – R2	UEFA Cup Winners' Cup – R1		
1986–87	NPL	42	25	12	5	74	35	87	2nd	SF					
1987–88	NPL-PRM	42	20	10	12	72	55	70	7th	R5	1QR	FA Trophy – R1			
1988–89	NPL-PRM	42	22	10	10	77	48	76	4th	R5	3QR	FA Trophy – R1			
1989–90	NPL-PRM	42	15	15	12	64	58	60	10th	R5	2QR	FA Trophy – R1			
1990–91	NPL-PRM	40	9	12	19	52	70	39	18th	R5	3QR	FA Trophy – 3QR			
1991–92	NPL-PRM	42	11	10	21	46	57	43	20th	R3	1QR	FA Trophy – R2			

=== Welsh Football ===
Season	League									Welsh Cup	Welsh League Cup	FAW Premier Cup	Europe	Top goalscorer	
Season	Division	P	W	D	L	F	A	Pts	Pos	Welsh Cup	Welsh League Cup	FAW Premier Cup	Europe	Name	Goals
1992–93	LOW	38	19	7	12	77	58	64	5th	R4	R1	Not contested			
1993–94	LOW	38	26	5	7	82	26	83	1st	SF	Runners-up	Not contested			
1994–95	LOW	38	27	7	4	96	26	88	1st	R5	QF	Not contested	UEFA Europa League – PR		
1995–96	LOW	40	21	6	13	72	65	69	4th	R3	R1	Not contested	UEFA Europa League – PR		
1996–97	LOW	40	20	5	15	82	62	65	8th	R3	Runners-up	Not contested			
1997–98	LOW	38	20	8	10	72	54	68	6th	Winners	Runners-up	QF			
1998–99	LOW	32	11	6	15	44	49	39	11th	R3	SF	R1	UEFA Cup Winners' Cup – QR		
1999–2000	LOW	34	15	3	16	56	61	48	9th	Winners	Runners-up			Gavin Allen	21
2000–01	LOW	34	10	7	17	56	84	37	14th	R5	R1	R1	UEFA Europa League – QR	Marc Lloyd-Williams	21
2001–02	LOW	34	21	6	7	83	38	69	3rd	Runners-up	QF			Marc Lloyd-Williams	66
2002–03	WPL	34	22	5	7	75	34	71	3rd	R5	Runners-up	R1	UEFA Europa League – QR	Lee Hunt	21
2003–04	WPL	32	16	6	10	72	47	54	6th	R2	SF	R1	UEFA Intertoto Cup – R1	Paul Gedman	16
2004–05	WPL	34	20	7	7	73	44	67	3rd	R4	R1	SF		Paul Roberts	33
2005–06	WPL	34	14	3	17	51	54	45	9th	Runners-up	R1	R2	UEFA Intertoto Cup – R1	Paul Roberts	26
2006–07	WPL	32	14	6	12	55	47	48	9th	R3	R1	R2		Marc Lloyd-Williams	20
2007–08	WPL	34	15	10	9	62	31	55	5th	Winners	SF	R2		Ashley Stott	29
2008–09	WPL	34	16	7	11	58	40	55	6th	Winners	Runners-up	Not contested	UEFA Europa League – QR	Chris Sharp	27
2009–10	WPL	34	19	6	9	75	45	63	5th	Winners	R1	Not contested	UEFA Europa League – 2QR	Jamie Reed	30
2010–11	WPL	32	22	4	6	80	44	70	1st	Runner-up	SF	Not contested	UEFA Europa League – 3QR	Alan Bull	21
2011–12	WPL	32	22	3	7	72	45	69	2nd	R3	R2	Not contested	UEFA Champions League – 2QR	Les Davies	16
2012–13	WPL	32	14	9	9	65	53	51	3rd	Runners-up	R2	Not contested	UEFA Europa League – 1QR	Chris Simm	21
2013–14	WPL	32	14	6	12	47	50	48	4th	R4	R1	Not contested		Les Davies	14
2014–15	WPL	32	9	8	15	48	62	35	10th	QF	R3	Not contested	Europa League – 1QR	Sion Edwards	8
2015–16	WPL	32	13	6	13	49	52	45	9th	R3	R1	Not contested		Porya Ahmadi	8
2016–17	WPL	32	16	4	12	53	55	52	4th	R5	QF	Not contested		Daniel Nardiello & Henry Jones	14
2017–18	WPL	32	19	3	10	49	32	60	2nd	SF	R2	Not contested		Dean Rittenberg	8
2018–19	CA	30	16	3	11	68	48	51	4th	R4	R1	Not contested			

==== Key ====
Champions	Runners-up	Promoted	Relegated

- P = Played
- W = Games won
- D = Games drawn
- L = Games lost
- F = Goals for
- A = Goals against
- Pts = Points
- Pos = Final position
- italic = Season in Progress
- R1 = Round 1
- R2 = Round 2
- R3 = Round 3
- R4 = Round 4
- R5 = Round 5
- R6 = Round 6
- PR = Preliminary round
- QR = Qualifying round
- Group = Group stage
- QF = Quarter-finals
- SF = Semi-finals
- F = Final

==== Leagues ====
Welsh Leagues

- NWCL = North Wales Coast League
- NWA = North Wales Alliance
- WNL = Welsh National League (North)
- NWFC = North Wales Football Combination
- LOW = League of Wales
- WPL = Welsh Premier League
- CA = Cymru Alliance

English Leagues

- Com. = The Combination
- B'HAM = Birmingham & District League
- LANC = Lancashire Combination
- CCL = Cheshire County League
- NPL = Northern Premier League
  - NPL-PRM = Northern Premier League Premier Division
- APL = Alliance Premier League

== See also ==
- Welsh Premier League
- Welsh Cup
- FA Cup
