= List of Carmarthen Town A.F.C. seasons =

This is a list of seasons played by Carmarthen Town A.F.C. in Welsh and European football, from 1954–55 (the earliest season for which complete league records are available) to the end of the most recently completed season. It details the club's performance in league and cup competitions.

Carmarthen Town have won the Welsh Cup once, the Welsh League Cup three times and the Welsh Football League Cup once. The club has competed in UEFA competitions on four occasions: twice in the UEFA Cup and twice in the UEFA Intertoto Cup.

== Key ==
- P = Played
- W = Games won
- D = Games drawn
- L = Games lost
- F = Goals for
- A = Goals against
- Pts = Points
- Pos = Final position
- Cymru P = Cymru Premier
- Cymru S = Cymru South
- WPL = Welsh Premier League
- LoW = League of Wales
- Div One = Welsh Football League Division One
- Div Two = Welsh Football League Division Two
- Div Two(W) = Welsh Football League Division Two West
- F = Final
- SF = Semi-finals
- QF = Quarter-finals
- QR1 = First Qualifying Round
- QR2 = Second Qualifying Round
- Group = Group stage
- R1 = Round 1
- R2 = Round 2
- R3 = Round 3
- R4 = Round 4
- R5 = Round 5

1st or W	Winners
2nd or RU	Runners-up
↑	Promoted
↓	Relegated

== Seasons ==
Results of league and cup competitions by season
Season	Division	P	W	D	L	F	A	Pts	Pos	Welsh Cup	League Cup	Football League Cup	FAW Cup	Competition	Result
Season	League									Welsh Cup	League Cup	Football League Cup	FAW Cup	Europe	
1950–51^{[A]}	—	—	—	—	—	—	—	—	—	—	—	—	—	—	—
1951–52	—	—	—	—	—	—	—	—	—	—	—	—	—	—	—
1952–53^{[B]}	—	—	—	—	—	—	—	—	—	—	—	—	—	—	—
1953–54	—	—	—	—	—	—	—	—	—	—	—	—	—	—	—
1954–55^{[C]}	Div Two(W)	38	30	5	3	144	42	65	3rd	—	—	—	—	—	—
1955–56	Div Two(W)	32	26	4	2	122	35	56	2nd	—	—	—	—	—	—
1956–57	Div Two(W)	32	23	5	4	113	41	51	2nd	—	—	—	—	—	—
1957–58	Div Two(W)	38	27	5	6	142	47	59	3rd	—	—	—	—	—	—
1958–59	Div Two(W)	36	25	2	9	128	51	52	2nd	—	—	—	—	—	—
1959–60	Div Two(W)	34	25	5	4	133	47	55	1st↑	R2	—	—	—	—	—
1960–61	Div One	38	5	4	29	48	133	14	20th↓	—	—	—	—	—	—
1961–62	Div Two(W)	30	20	5	5	71	42	45	2nd	—	—	—	—	—	—
1962–63	Div Two(W)	30	20	2	8	91	46	42	4th	—	—	—	—	—	—
1963–64	Div Two(W)	26	16	8	2	78	26	40	2nd	—	—	—	—	—	—
1964–65	Div One^{[C]}	30	10	8	12	67	69	28	7th	—	—	—	—	—	—
1965–66	Div One	30	10	9	11	74	69	29	7th	—	—	—	—	—	—
1966–67	Div One	30	17	6	7	84	50	40	3rd	—	—	—	—	—	—
1967–68	Div One	32	11	8	13	57	54	30	10th	R2	—	—	—	—	—
1968–69	Div One	34	11	8	15	64	78	30	12th	—	—	—	—	—	—
1969–70	Div One	32	5	5	22	42	78	15	16th	—	—	—	—	—	—
1970–71	Div One	34	13	9	12	70	68	35	8th	—	—	—	—	—	—
1971–72	Div One	34	14	4	16	61	70	32	11th	—	—	—	—	—	—
1972–73	Div One	34	21	6	7	76	40	48	3rd	—	—	—	—	—	—
1973–74	Div One	34	18	8	8	63	48	44	4th	—	—	—	—	—	—
1974–75	Div One	34	6	13	15	41	72	25	15th	—	—	—	—	—	—
1975–76	Div One	34	7	10	17	49	97	24	16th↓	—	—	—	—	—	—
1976–77	Div Two	34	13	6	15	61	74	32	11th	—	—	—	—	—	—
1977–78	Div Two	38	18	9	11	89	64	45	6th	—	—	—	—	—	—
1978–79	Div Two	38	25	6	7	90	46	56	2nd↑	—	—	—	—	—	—
1979–80	Div One	34	11	8	15	59	73	30	12th	—	—	—	—	—	—
1980–81	Div One	34	8	14	12	47	57	30	12th	—	—	—	—	—	—
1981–82	Div One	34	5	11	18	28	69	26	16th↓	R1	—	—	—	—	—
1982–83	Div Two	32	18	7	7	60	35	61	5th	—	—	—	—	—	—
1983–84	Div One^{[D]}	36	19	9	8	64	36	66	5th	—	—	—	—	—	—
1984–85	Div One	32	9	8	15	39	64	35	12th	R1	—	—	—	—	—
1985–86	Div One	30	14	8	8	60	42	50	5th	R2	—	—	—	—	—
1986–87	Div One	34	8	10	16	42	59	34	14th	R1	—	—	—	—	—
1987–88	Div One	34	12	10	12	44	45	46	11th	R2	—	—	—	—	—
1988–89	Div One	34	19	6	9	62	38	63	5th	R2	—	—	—	—	—
1989–90	Div One	32	16	3	13	68	55	51	6th	R2	—	—	—	—	—
1990–91	Div Two^{[E]}	32	17	5	10	82	57	56	5th	R2	—	—	—	—	—
1991–92	Div Two	32	22	6	4	71	19	72	2nd	R2	—	—	—	—	—
1992–93	Div Two^{[F]}	26	10	8	8	51	43	38	5th	R2	—	—	—	—	—
1993–94	Div Two	26	15	3	8	58	47	48	3rd↑	R1	—	—	—	—	—
1994–95	Div One	36	20	9	7	89	45	69	3rd	R2	—	—	—	—	—
1995–96	Div One	34	25	7	2	101	37	82	1st↑	R1	—	W	—	—	—
1996–97	LoW	40	11	7	22	41	79	40	16th	R2	R2	—	—	—	—
1997–98	LoW	38	11	11	16	57	72	44	12th	R4	R1	—	—	—	—
1998–99	LoW	32	13	8	11	46	46	47	9th	RU	R1	—	—	—	—
1999–00	LoW	34	22	3	9	68	42	69	4th	R5	R1	—	—	—	—
2000–01	LoW	34	17	7	10	68	39	58	3rd	R4	R4	—	QF	—	—
2001–02	LoW	34	13	9	12	51	37	48	10th	R5	SF	—	QF	UEFA Intertoto Cup	R1
2002–03	WPL^{[G]}	34	9	5	20	33	66	32	15th	R4	R2	—	—	—	—
2003–04	WPL	32	3	11	18	28	69	20	16th	R2	RU	—	—	—	—
2004–05	WPL	34	17	10	7	60	34	61	6th	RU	W	—	—	—	—
2005–06	WPL	34	17	6	11	62	42	57	4th	QF	R1	—	SF	UEFA Cup	QR2
2006–07	WPL	32	14	8	10	57	50	50	7th	W	QF	—	QF	UEFA Intertoto Cup	R1
2007–08	WPL	34	15	9	10	59	47	54	6th	R3	QF	—	SF	UEFA Cup	QR1
2008–09	WPL	34	19	5	10	52	47	62	4th	SF	Group	—	^{[H]}	—	—
2009–10	WPL	34	12	9	13	45	38	45	10th	R3	Group	—	—	—	—
2010–11	WPL^{[I]}	32	10	5	17	39	64	35	10th	R4	R1	—	—	—	—
2011–12	WPL	32	10	2	20	33	37	32	11th	QF	R1	—	—	—	—
2012–13	WPL	32	10	7	15	36	50	37	6th	QF	W	—	—	—	—
2013–14	WPL	32	14	6	12	54	51	48	3rd	R4	W	—	—	—	—
2014–15	WPL	32	12	6	14	48	57	42	9th	QF	R2	—	—	—	—
2015–16	WPL	32	14	5	13	45	52	47	7th	R3	SF	—	—	—	—
2016–17	WPL	32	10	9	13	40	46	39	5th	R3	SF	—	—	—	—
2017–18	WPL	32	8	5	19	35	62	29	11th	QF	QF	—	—	—	—
2018–19	WPL	32	12	6	14	49	53	39*^{[J]}	9th	R4	R2	—	—	—	—
2019–20	Cymru P^{[K]}	25	4	6	15	28	49	18	11th↓^{[L]}	R3	QF	—	—	—	—
2020–21^{[M]}	Cymru S	—	—	—	—	—	—	—	—	—	—	—	—	—	—
2021–22	Cymru S	30	15	9	6	52	25	51*^{[N]}	5th	R4	R1	—	—	—	—
2022–23	Cymru S	30	16	4	10	66	41	52	4th	R3	R2	—	—	—	—
2023–24	Cymru S	30	12	11	7	50	39	47	6th	R4	R1	—	—	—	—
2024–25	Cymru S	30	12	9	9	55	44	45	7th	QF	R2	—	—	—	—
2025–26	Cymru S	30	11	12	7	45	38	45	5th	R3	R1	—	—	—	—

== Footnotes ==
A. In 1950 Carmarthen Town was founded.
B. In 1952 Carmarthen Town moved to Richmond Park.
C. In 1954 Carmarthen Town were elected to the Welsh League.
D. Placed in Division One upon league re-organisation
E. Placed in Welsh Football League Division One on league reorganisation.
F. Division One renamed Division Two.
G. The League of Wales was formed. Carmarthen placed in Division Two after league re-organisation (effectively promoted).
H. League of Wales re-branded as Welsh Premier League.
I. In 2008 the FAW Premier Cup was discontinued.
J. Welsh Premier League reduced in size from 18 to 12 teams.
K. Carmarthen Town were deducted 3 points after fielding an ineligible player
L. 2019-20 Welsh Premier League re-branded as Cymru Premier.
M. Season ended early to due Covid-19 virus. League decided on a points per game basis. Relegated to Cymru South.
N. 2020-21 Season in Wales (below Tier 1) cancelled due to Covid-19 regulations
O. Carmarthen Town deducted three points for failing to fulfill fixture
