= Richard Kennedy (footballer) =

Irish footballer (born 1978)

Personal information
- Full name: Richard Joseph Kennedy
- Date of birth: 28 August 1978 (age 48)
- Place of birth: Waterford, Ireland
- Height: 5 ft 11 in (1.80 m)
- Position: Midfielder

Youth career
- 1995–1997: Crystal Palace

Senior career*
Years	Team	Apps	(Gls)
1997–1998	Crystal Palace	0	(0)
1998–1999	Wycombe Wanderers	0	(0)
1999–2001	Brentford	10	(0)
1999	→ Crawley Town (loan)	0	(0)
2001	Crawley Town	0	(0)
2001–2003	Barry Town	72	(5)
2003	Forest Green Rovers	13	(1)
2003–2004	Barry Town	1	(1)
2004	Waterford United	5	(0)
2004–2006	Carmarthen Town	47	(1)
- * Club domestic league appearances and goals

Richard Joseph Kennedy (born 28 August 1978) is an Irish retired semi-professional footballer who played as a midfielder. He began his career in the youth system at Crystal Palace and made his Football League debut in 1999 while at Brentford. Kennedy won three League of Wales and Welsh Cup doubles with Barry Town between 2001 and 2003 and played in the Champions League with the club. He retired in 2006 and is now a personal trainer and a fitness coach at Clonmel Town.

== Club career ==
=== Crystal Palace ===
Kennedy began his career in the youth system at Crystal Palace. He suffered from homesickness during the 1995–96 season, but slowly earned a regular place in the youth team. Kennedy reached the final of the FA Youth Cup and won the Southern Junior Floodlit Cup with the youth team during the 1996–97 season. He signed his first professional contract in March 1997 and was released at the end of the 1997–98 season, having failed to make a first team appearance. A double hernia operation kept Kennedy out for three months during the 1998 off-season and hindered his chances of finding a new club for the 1998–99 season.

=== Wycombe Wanderers ===
Kennedy signed for Second Division club Wycombe Wanderers in October 1998. He failed to make a first team appearance for the club and instead played for the reserves. He departed Adams Park in July 1999.

=== Brentford ===
Kennedy signed for Second Division club Brentford on a two-year contract on a free transfer in July 1999. He received his first call into the first team squad for a league match versus Cardiff City on 28 September 1999 and made his professional debut when he replaced Andy Scott after 85 minutes of the 2–1 victory. He made regular appearances during January 2000, but his season ended after he suffered a torn cartilage during a 2–0 home defeat by Wigan Athletic on 1 April. He made 10 appearances during the 1999–00 season. Kennedy was injured and out of favour under new manager Ray Lewington during the 2000–01 season and made just two appearances before being released on 20 March 2001. He made just 12 appearances during 18 months at Griffin Park.

=== Crawley Town ===
Kennedy joined Southern League Premier Division club Crawley Town on a permanent contract in March 2001. He had previously had a spell on loan at the club during the 1999–00 season. He made his only appearance for the club in a 3–0 Southern League Cup win over St Leonards on 27 March and departed two days later. Kennedy subsequently went on trial at several league clubs, but failed to earn a contract.

=== Barry Town ===
Kennedy signed for League of Wales high fliers Barry Town on 29 March 2001 and scored on his debut in a 7–1 win over Llanelli. He made seven appearances and scored one goal in what remained of the 2000–01 season as Barry achieved the League of Wales and Welsh Cup double. The title win saw Barry qualify for the Champions League for the 2001–02 season and Kennedy made his European debut when he replaced Kenny Brown after 76 minutes of a 2–0 first qualifying round win over Shamkir, which saw Barry progress to the second qualifying round 3–0 on aggregate. He made 28 league appearances during the 2001–02 season and won his second double in succession.

Kennedy made 29 league appearances and scored one goal on the way to his and Barry's third consecutive double in 2002–03. Financial problems forced the owners of the club to file for administration early in the 2003–04 season and Kennedy departed in September 2003.

=== Forest Green Rovers ===
Kennedy joined Conference club Forest Green Rovers on 5 September 2003. He made 15 appearances for Forest Green and scored one goal before departing the club on 1 February 2004. Looking back on his time with Rovers, Kennedy said that "it was a long commute and with a close family bereavement, my heart really wasn't in it".

=== Return to Barry Town ===
Kennedy returned to ailing Barry Town in 2004 and made 73 league appearances and scored six league goals across his two spells with the Dragons.

=== Waterford United ===
Kennedy returned to Ireland in 2004 to sign for hometown club Waterford United (then of the League of Ireland Premier Division) for the 2004 season. His made five appearances before his departure in August 2004. Reflecting on his time with the club, he said "my form was mixed and I didn't really settle back home".

=== Carmarthen Town ===
Kennedy returned to the Welsh Premier League to sign for Carmarthen Town in August 2004. He had a successful 2004–05 season with the club, making 30 appearances, scoring one goal and winning the Welsh League Cup. Kennedy made 17 appearances during the 2005–06 season, with the club finishing fourth in the league and as runners-up to Haverfordwest County in the West Wales Senior Cup. He retired from football after the season.

== Personal trainer ==
Kennedy is a qualified personal trainer and is the owner of Fitness Freak Gym in Rathgormack, Ireland. During the 2013 off-season, Kennedy helped former Crystal Palace teammate and Republic of Ireland international Stephen Hunt back to fitness after his release from Wolverhampton Wanderers.

== Fitness coach ==
During the 2013 off-season, Kennedy was named fitness coach at Tipperary Southern & District League Premier Division club Clonmel Town.

== Honours ==
Crystal Palace

- Southern Junior Floodlit Cup (1): 1996–97

Barry Town

- League of Wales (2): 2000–01, 2001–02
- Welsh Premier League (1): 2002–03
- Welsh Cup (3): 2000–01, 2001–02, 2002–03

Carmarthen Town

- Welsh League Cup (1): 2004–05

== Career statistics ==
Appearances and goals by club, season and competition
Club	Season	League			National Cup		League Cup		Europe		Other		Total	
Club	Season	Division	Apps	Goals	Apps	Goals	Apps	Goals	Apps	Goals	Apps	Goals	Apps	Goals
Brentford	1999–00	Second Division	9	0	0	0	0	0	―		1 (Note: Appearance in Football League Trophy)	0	10	0
Brentford	2000–01	Second Division	1	0	0	0	0	0	―		1	0	2	0
Brentford	Total		10	0	0	0	0	0	―		2	0	12	0
Crawley Town	2000–01	Southern League Premier Division	0	0	―		―		―		1 (Note: Appearance in Southern League Cup)	0	1	0
Barry Town	2000–01	League of Wales	7	2	0	0	―		―		―		7	2
Barry Town	2001–02	League of Wales	29	0	0	0	0	0	3 (Note: Appearances in Champions League)	0	―		32	0
Barry Town	2002–03	Welsh Premier League	29	1	0	0	0	0	2	0	―		31	1
Barry Town	2003–04	Welsh Premier League	7	2	0	0	0	0	2	0	―		9	2
Barry Town	Total		72	5	0	0	0	0	7	0	―		79	5
Forest Green Rovers	2003–04	Conference	13	1	1	0	―		―		1	1	15	1
Barry Town	2003–04	Welsh Premier League	1	1	0	0	0	0	0	0	―		1	1
Barry Town	Total		73	6	0	0	0	0	7	0	―		80	6
Carmarthen Town	2004–05	Welsh Premier League	30	1	0	0	0	0	―		―		30	1
Carmarthen Town	2005–06	Welsh Premier League	17	0	0	0	0	0	4 (Note: Appearances in UEFA Cup)	0	―		21	0
Carmarthen Town	Total		47	1	0	0	0	0	4	0	―		51	1
Career total			143	8	1	0	0	0	11	0	4	1	159	9
