= Mark Aizlewood =

Welsh association football player (born 1959)

Personal information
- Full name: Mark Aizlewood
- Date of birth: 1 October 1959 (age 67)
- Place of birth: Newport, Wales
- Height: 6 ft 0 in (1.83 m)
- Position: Defender

Team information
- Current team: Carmarthen Town (manager)

Senior career*
Years	Team	Apps	(Gls)
1975–1978	Newport County	38	(1)
1978–1982	Luton Town	98	(3)
1982–1987	Charlton Athletic	152	(9)
1987–1989	Leeds United	69	(3)
1989–1990	Bradford City	39	(1)
1990–1993	Bristol City	101	(3)
1993–1995	Cardiff City	39	(3)
1995–1996	Merthyr Tydfil		
1996–1997	Aberystwyth Town	30	(1)
1997–2000	Cwmbran Town	69	(0)

International career
1979–1980	Wales U21	2	(0)
1986–1994	Wales	39	(0)

Managerial career
- 2012–2018: Carmarthen Town
- 2022–2026: Carmarthen Town
- * Club domestic league appearances and goals

Mark Aizlewood (born 1 October 1959) is a Welsh manager and former professional footballer who manages Cymru South side Carmarthen Town.

Having started his football career at his hometown club Newport County, making his professional debut at the age of 16 in 1976, he went on to make over 500 appearances in the Football League, most notably for Charlton Athletic, Leeds United and Bristol City, and gained 39 caps for Wales.

Following his retirement, Aizlewood worked as an assistant manager with Carmarthen Town on two occasions and later worked as assistant manager to Ian Rush at Chester City. He also spent two years as the technical director of the Welsh Football Trust, being placed in charge of developing youth football in Wales. In 2012, he returned to Welsh Premier League side Carmarthen Town as manager and lead the club to consecutive Welsh League Cup victories in 2013 and 2014. His contract as manager was terminated after he was convicted of serious fraud in February 2018.

== Early life ==
Aizlewood was born in Newport and grew up in the Ringland area. His father was a steelworker who had moved to Newport from Wolverhampton. As a child, he attended Alway Juniors School and then Hartridge High School in Newport. His older brother Steve was also a professional footballer.

== Playing career ==
After playing for local youth club Cromwell, Aizlewood joined his home-town club Newport County at the age of 14, turning down an offer to join Arsenal. Earning a wage of five pounds per week to cover expenses, he made his professional debut two years later at the age of just 16, whilst he was still attending school. He played for Newport for three years, leaving in 1978 to join Luton Town for a fee of £50,000, becoming David Pleat's first signing at the club. After four seasons at Luton, winning the Second Division title in his final year, he moved on to Charlton Athletic in 1982, again for a fee of £50,000. He was later appointed club captain and was named the club's player of the year for both the 1984–85 and 1985–86 seasons.

In 1987, Charlton received an offer of £200,000 from Leeds United for Aizlewood. Despite resistance from manager Lennie Lawrence, Aizlewood decided to accept the move as the club were then managed by one of his boyhood idols, Billy Bremner. Signed as a replacement for Ian Snodin, who had left the club to join Everton, he made his debut in a goalless draw with Sheffield United on 7 February 1987. He became influential almost immediately, missing just one league match for the rest of the season as Leeds finished in fourth position and went on to reach the play-off final, losing to his former club Charlton. Aizlewood was also appointed club captain. However, the following season, Leeds struggled to repeat their good form, following the sales of Andy Ritchie and Ian Baird, and Bremner was sacked from his position as manager. Aizlewood himself became a target for some fans frustration and during a Second Division clash with Walsall at the end of the 1988–89 season, he reacted to jeers by Leeds' own fans by displaying a V sign, an offensive gesture in the UK, to the crowd after scoring in the closing stages to make the score 1–0. Leeds manager Howard Wilkinson quickly substituted Aizlewood, who blew kisses to the crowd and removed his captain's armband, for David Batty. He reacted furiously toward Wilkinson and refused a seat on the bench, returning straight to the dressing room.

He left the club soon after in a £125,000 move to Bradford City, with Aizlewood keen to remain in Yorkshire where his family was settled, reuniting Aizlewood with his former manager at international level, Terry Yorath. He spent one season at Valley Parade, making 39 league appearances, before moving on to Bristol City. He spent three seasons with Bristol, making over 100 appearances in all competitions and scoring three times.

In 1993, he returned to Wales to sign for Cardiff City. In his one full season at Ninian Park, the club narrowly avoided relegation to Division Three but did reach the final of the Welsh Cup, losing 2–1 to Barry Town. He was also named man of the match in the club's 1–0 FA Cup fourth-round victory over Premier League side Manchester City in January 1994. During the following season, Aizlewood decided to leave the club in order to take up a player-coach role at Merthyr Tydfil. He later finished his career with spells at Welsh Premier League sides Aberystwyth Town and Cwmbran Town before retiring in 2000.

== International career ==
Having previously captained Wales at youth level, Aizlewood played twice for the Wales under-21 side, making his debut in a 1–0 defeat to England on 6 February 1979 before winning his second cap a year later in September 1980 in a 2–0 victory over the Netherlands.

Aizlewood made his debut for the Wales senior side on 25 February 1986, during a 2–1 victory over Saudi Arabia in Riyadh. His last appearance came on 14 December 1994 as Wales lost 3–0 to Bulgaria in a Euro 96 qualifier at Cardiff Arms Park. He finished his career having won 39 caps for Wales without scoring.

== Management and coaching career ==
=== FAW Trust ===
In 2001, Aizlewood was appointed as technical director of the Welsh Football Trust, a governing body of the Football Association of Wales (FAW), following the resignation of Mike Rigg, a role which he described as his "dream job". However, despite increasing the trust's coaching revenues by 75 per cent during his time in charge, he was sacked in December 2003 following an altercation with a BBC camera crew and presenter. During filming of an interview BBC investigative programme X-Ray, Aizlewood reportedly attempted to forcibly remove a tape from a camera and chased the crew from the trust's offices in Cardiff. He was also accused of assaulting presenter Jane Harvey by "grabbing her around the neck and pushing her down a flight of steps" with Harvey describing him as "berserk". He was later convicted of assaulting Harvey and ordered to pay a fine of £1,800 and his conduct was described by the judge as "entirely inappropriate."

=== Chester City ===
Aizlewood had a spell on the coaching staff of Carmarthen Town during 2003–04, but left to become assistant manager to Ian Rush at Chester City for 2004–05. The club made a strong start to the season, embarking on a ten match unbeaten run, and Rush was linked to the vacant Wales job but a difficult period in the second half of the season, winning just 2 out of 10 matches, saw the club fall down the table and pressure grew on Rush and his management team. On 4 April 2005, Aizlewood was sacked by Chester chairman Stephen Vaughan without Rush's knowledge. Rush himself resigned two days later in protest of the decision, stating "Loyalty is vital in football and I am a loyal person. When a valued member of my team is dismissed against my wishes, I have no option but to follow my principles." When the pair left the club, Chester were nine points clear of the relegation zone, having been bottom of the table when they arrived. Rush later described Aizlewood as "one of the best coaches I have worked with."

=== Carmarthen Town ===
Aizlewood worked as an agent briefly after leaving Chester as well as managing his business interests. Having considered leaving football, he was handed his first job as manager in January 2012 by Jeff Thomas, chairman of Carmarthen Town. Returning to the club to replace Tomi Morgan, having previously worked there as assistant manager to Andrew York and Deryn Brace in separate spells. The club were joint bottom of the Welsh Premier League on his appointment, along with Newtown, but Aizlewood was able to steer them away from relegation. The following year, Aizlewood lead the club to the Welsh League Cup final, defeating The New Saints on penalties to claim the trophy for only the second time in the club's history. They retained the trophy in the 2013–14 season, defeating Bala Town in the final.

In November 2014, Aizlewood attempted to register himself as a player for Carmarthen, at the age of 55, following an injury crisis at the club prior to a league fixture against Rhyl. However, the plans were ended following a fire at Rhyl's ground which postponed the fixture. He was sacked by the club in February 2018 following his fraud conviction after six years in charge.

In April 2022, Aizlewood was reappointed as manager of Carmarthen Town after the departure of Sean Cresser.

== Personal life ==
Aizlewood speaks Welsh, having taken up lessons during a long injury spell as a player. After becoming proficient with the language he entered the Welsh Learner of the Year competition at the National Eisteddfod of Wales in Llandeilo where he was named as the winner.

=== Addiction battle ===
He released his Welsh language autobiography in 2009, entitled Amddiffyn fy Hun (Defending Myself) in which he revealed his 27-year-long battle with alcoholism and gambling and contemplating suicide. All proceeds from the book were donated to former England player Tony Adams Sporting Chance charity. His alcohol problem began as an 18-year-old, during his time at Luton Town where he found himself with a large disposable income. Remarking on this period, Aizlewood has stated: "I was making a very good living [...] sometimes I didn't drink for two or three weeks, but then I'd drink for three of four days in one go." At his worst, Aizlewood was able to drink a bottle of brandy and 20 pints of lager in one session and still stand. He also developed a gambling addiction and has admitted to losing up to £30,000 in a single day. In his book, Aizlewood confessed to once nearly attempting suicide during a trip to Rome in 2003 due to the severity of his addictions. He stated that on 14 February, he had stood on a motorway bridge in the Italian capital in the early hours of the morning and considered jumping 50 ft to the carriageway below, commenting " I didn't have an ounce of fear as I stood on the small wall and looked down at the cars speeding along the road 50ft below me, because I only had one intention: to jump."

=== Punditry ===
Following his retirement from playing, Aizlewood worked as a pundit for BBC Wales, covering Welsh football, where he developed a reputation as an outspoken critic. He was particularly critical of Swansea City and their decision to sign several foreign players whilst playing in the lower leagues. Swansea forward Giovanni Savarese, along with other players, was branded unreliable by Aizlewood and, following Savarese being dismissed for a deliberate elbow on Wrexham defender Mark McGregor during the 2001 FAW Premier Cup final, Aizlewood was accused of racism after calling Savarese a "coward" and stating "but that's foreigners for you". His outspoken views of Swansea and their players made him a target for fans of the club and, in October 2002, Aizlewood was attacked by a group of Swansea fans, after commentating at a game against Rochdale at Vetch Field, who pushed him into a gate, causing him to suffer grazing to his eye. BBC Wales head of sport, Nigel Walker demanded that the club would assure Aizlewood's safety at future matches following the incident.

== Fraud conviction ==
After an investigation by various newspapers, in 2012, Aizlewood was one of three men arrested in connection with allegations of fraud regarding £1.6m of government funds that had been given to Luis Michael Training Ltd based in Newport, a company where Aizlewood was serving as a director. The company offered football apprenticeships, promising to provide full-time training in football coaching as well as work experience and a £95 weekly salary, to up to 3,800 students. However, the company focused on targeting young players from youth clubs between 2009 and 2011, fraudulently obtaining around £5m of public funds, used by the Skills Funding Agency to create apprenticeships for vulnerable young people. On investigation by Gwent Police and the Fraud office of the Metropolitan Police, the prosecution claimed that for every apprentice enrolled in the youth scheme, the defendants claimed funds provided by the UK government. It was also found that many students on their books did not even exist, whilst many of the youngsters that were listed lived far outside the reach of the scheme, or were doing less than four hours of study a week. Aizlewood was later banned from serving as a director of any company for six years, along with fellow ex-footballer Paul Sugrue and two others.

In June 2016, Aizlewood was charged following an investigation by the Serious Fraud Office. He appeared at Southwark Crown Court in November 2017. In his defence, Aizlewood stated that he had neither the "time or inclination" to take part in the fraud due to a troubled home life with his wife Penny suffering from alcohol and drug addiction. Penny later committed suicide in 2016 following their break-up. In January 2018 he was convicted of one count of conspiracy to commit fraud by false representation, after taking money in the fake apprenticeship scheme. Aizlewood was convicted alongside Sugrue and four other directors. Judge Michael Tomlinson described the case as "very serious" and released the defendants on bail until sentencing at a later date. He was later jailed for six years starting from his conviction in February 2018.

== Honours ==
=== Player ===
Luton Town

- Football League Second Division winners: 1981–82

Cardiff City

- Welsh Cup runners-up: 1993–94

=== Manager ===
Carmarthen Town

- Welsh League Cup Winner: 2012–13, 2013–14
