= Layton Maxwell =

Welsh footballer

Personal information
- Full name: Layton Jonathan Maxwell
- Date of birth: 3 October 1979 (age 47)
- Place of birth: St Asaph, Wales
- Position: Midfielder

Youth career
- 1997–1999: Liverpool

Senior career*
Years	Team	Apps	(Gls)
1999–2001	Liverpool	0	(0)
2000–2001	→ Stockport County (loan)	20	(2)
2001–2004	Cardiff City	34	(1)
2003	→ Barry Town (loan)	1	(0)
2004	Swansea City	3	(0)
2004	Carmarthen Town	8	(2)
2004–2005	Mansfield Town	1	(0)
2005	Rhyl	6	(0)
2005–2006	Bangor City	31	(4)
2006–2008	Caernarfon Town	50	(10)
2008–2009	Aberaman Athletic	15	(1)
2009–2010	Maesteg Park	?	(?)
2010	Barry Town	11	(4)
2011–2012	Pontypridd United	?	(?)
Total		180	(24)

International career
1999–2001	Wales U21	14	(0)

Managerial career
- 201?–2020: Cardiff Draconians
- * Club domestic league appearances and goals

Layton Jonathan Maxwell (born 3 October 1979) is a Welsh former professional footballer and manager.

He played as a midfielder, notably for Liverpool where despite not featuring in the Premier League he would play and score in a single Football League Cup game in 1999. He also played in the Football League for Stockport County, Cardiff City, Swansea City and Mansfield Town. He also played in the League of Wales for Barry Town, Carmarthen Town, Rhyl, Bangor City, Caernarfon Town and Aberaman Athletic. He was capped 14 times at Wales U21 and later had a spell as manager of Cardiff Draconians.

In 2022, he was jailed for eight years for his part in a drug operation that saw police find drugs worth £6 million and £2.5 million in cash at his Cardiff home.

== Playing career ==
=== Liverpool ===
Born in St Asaph and brought up in nearby Dyserth, Maxwell began his career as a trainee with Liverpool. He became a regular in the reserve team, keeping Steven Gerrard out of the squad on occasion, and signed a professional contract with the club by the time he was 19. He made his debut for the Liverpool first team in a League Cup match against Hull City on 21 September 1999, scoring Liverpool's second goal at the Kop End in a 4–2 win.

However, that proved to be Maxwell's only appearance for the Reds, and he was loaned out to Stockport County for the final year of his contract, scoring two goals in 23 appearances. When his contract expired at the end of the 2000–01 season, Maxwell was given a free transfer and signed for Cardiff City.

=== Cardiff City ===
Maxwell made a promising start to his Cardiff career, making 21 appearances in his first season at Ninian Park. His second season with the Bluebirds went in a similar fashion, making a further 22 appearances in the first six months of the 2002–03 season. However, he was loaned to Barry Town for the remainder of the season.

Maxwell returned to Cardiff for the start of the 2003–04 season, but only made two more appearances before being granted a free transfer to Swansea City in March 2004. His only goal for Cardiff came in a league match away to Northampton Town. Before the end of the 2003–04 season, Maxwell managed to play three games for the Swans, but was again given a free transfer in June 2004.

=== League of Wales ===
In the summer of 2004, Maxwell signed for Carmarthen Town and made eight appearances before transferring to Mansfield Town. He went on trial with Newport County later in the season before finally moving back to North Wales to sign for Rhyl. Again, his tenure with Rhyl was short-lived and he signed for Bangor City for the 2005–06 season.

It was at Bangor that Maxwell finally managed to hold down a first team place, making 31 appearances and scoring 4 goals, but he was yet again sold on at the end of the season and moved to Caernarfon Town in July 2006. After an inconsistent spell at Caernarfon (his final season yielded only 13 starts and 1 goal), Maxwell went on trial with Port Talbot Town in the summer of 2008, but failed to earn a contract. Shortly before the start of the 2008–09 season, Maxwell signed for Welsh League side Aberaman Athletic, followed by spells at Maesteg Park and Pontypridd United, either side of a return to Barry.

== Management career ==
He managed Cardiff Draconians but stepped down in December 2020 citing increased work commitments.

== Criminal activity ==
In 2020, Maxwell was arrested in the National Crime Agency's Operation Venetic after they broke the encrypted Encrochat messaging service. In May 2021, he appeared at Cardiff Crown Court, where he pleaded guilty to conspiracy to supply a Class-A drug, namely cocaine. On 18 October 2022, Maxwell was jailed for eight years for his part in the operation. It was reported police had found drugs worth £6 million and £2.5 million in cash at his Cardiff home and had allowed a gang to use his premises as a safe house. Maxwell was paid £500 a month to be courier for the gang who were moving cocaine between Cardiff and Liverpool.

== Honours ==
Cardiff City

- Football League Second Division play-off: 2002–03
- FAW Premier Cup: 2001–02
