= Christian Doidge =

Welsh footballer (born 1992)

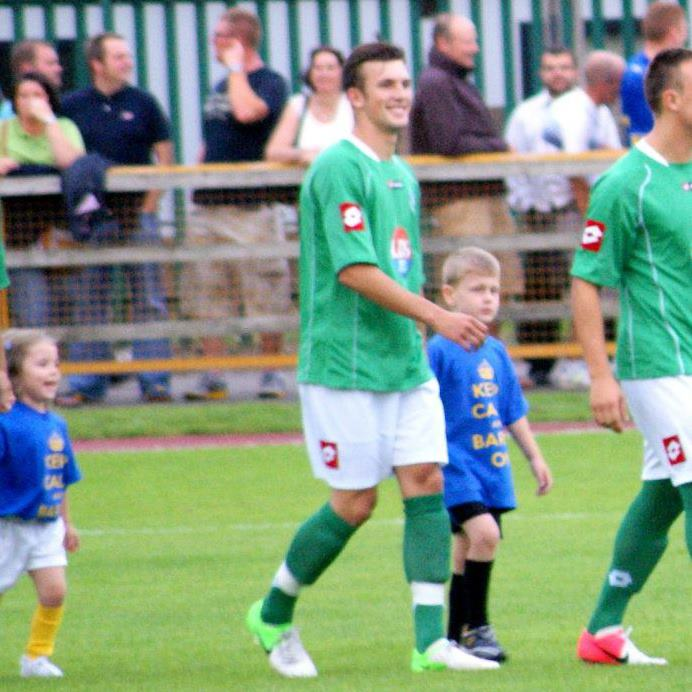

Personal information
- Full name: Christian Rhys Doidge
- Date of birth: 25 August 1992 (age 34)
- Place of birth: Newport, Wales
- Height: 1.85 m (6 ft 1 in)
- Position: Striker

Team information
- Current team: Newport County
- Number: 27

Youth career
- 2003–2006: Southampton
- 2006–2008: Bristol Rovers

Senior career*
Years	Team	Apps	(Gls)
2009–2010	Cwmbran Celtic		
2010–2011	Croesyceiliog		
2011–2013	Barry Town	30	(26)
2013–2014	Carmarthen Town	43	(19)
2014–2016	Dagenham & Redbridge	46	(10)
2015	→ Dartford (loan)	7	(0)
2016–2019	Forest Green Rovers	108	(59)
2018–2019	→ Bolton Wanderers (loan)	17	(1)
2019–2024	Hibernian	104	(24)
2022–2023	→ Kilmarnock (loan)	27	(3)
2024–2026	Forest Green Rovers	42	(11)
2026–	Newport County	8	(2)
- * Club domestic league appearances and goals as of 18:49, 10 October 2026 (UTC)

Christian Rhys Doidge (born 25 August 1992) is a Welsh professional footballer who plays as a striker for EFL League Two club Newport County.

Doidge played in the youth systems of Southampton and Bristol Rovers, but temporarily gave up football and played basketball for the Wales U18 national team. He resumed his football career in the Welsh leagues with Cwmbran Celtic, Croesyceiliog, Barry Town and Carmarthen Town. He then moved into English league football with Dagenham & Redbridge, and then played for Forest Green Rovers and Bolton Wanderers. He joined Scottish club Hibernian in 2019, and played on loan for Kilmarnock during the 2022–23 season before returning to Forest Green in January 2024.

== Career ==
=== Youth career ===
Doidge started his career in the youth system at Southampton where he spent three years before he was released after the club thought he would not be tall enough as a centre forward. He then joined Bristol Rovers for two years, but failed to earn a youth scholarship and was released in 2008 at the age of fifteen.

He then gave up football to play basketball with his friends and played county level for Gwent ABC. Shortly after he represented Wales in the European Championship in Malta.

=== Welsh league football ===
Doidge signed with Welsh Football League Division Two side Cwmbran Celtic for the 2009–10 season, and then moved to divisional rivals Croesyceiliog in 2010. In November 2011 he joined Welsh Football League First Division side Barry Town, going on to score sixteen goals in sixteen games in his maiden season for the club. In his second season for the club he netted ten times in fourteen appearances, including a hat-trick against Goytre United which propelled Barry to the top of the table. In November 2012, he hit the winner over Penrhyncoch which helped Town to their first Welsh Cup semi-final appearance in a decade.

In January 2013, he signed for Welsh Premier League side Carmarthen Town. In just his second game for the club he came on as a substitute to help Carmarthen win the Welsh League Cup, the side's first trophy in five years. During his time with Carmarthen, he scored nineteen goals in forty-three appearances. In April 2014, he joined Football League Two side Newport County on a week trial, however no move materialised.

=== Dagenham & Redbridge ===
In July 2014, he joined League Two side Dagenham & Redbridge on trial, scoring in pre-season friendlies against Tottenham Hotspur and Billericay Town. Dagenham then pulled out of a deal to sign Doidge after discovering they would have to pay a fee to Carmarthen, having believed the striker would be available on a free transfer. A deal was eventually agreed in August for a £20,000 fee, with Doidge signing a two-year contract, having also turned down an offer to sign for Conference Premier side and former club Bristol Rovers. Shortly after signing for the Daggers, he suffered an ankle injury during the warm-up against Hartlepool United, which kept him out of action for a month. In September 2014, he made his professional debut in a 1–1 draw with Cheltenham Town, replacing Jamie Cureton as a late substitute. His first professional goal came in a 3–1 defeat to Luton Town, scoring a consolation after coming on as a substitute. He struggled to retain a place in the first team and in January 2015 he was sent on loan to Conference Premier side Dartford on a one-month loan, to regain his fitness. He made his debut in the 6–1 away defeat to Dover Athletic. In his second season at Dagenham & Redbridge he managed to play a lot more games and ended the season as top scorer. He also won the club's player of the year and their supporters' player of the year awards.

=== Forest Green Rovers ===
In June 2016, Doidge signed a two-year contract with National League side Forest Green Rovers. His first goal for Forest Green came in a 4–1 away win over Maidstone United on 27 August 2016.

On 14 May 2017, he scored in a 3–1 win over Tranmere Rovers at Wembley Stadium in the 2016–17 National League play-off final to help Forest Green claim a place in the Football League for the first time in their history.

==== Bolton Wanderers (loan) ====
On 31 August 2018, Doidge signed for Championship side Bolton Wanderers on loan, with the deal due to be made permanent in January 2019. He made his debut for Bolton in a 2–1 home defeat against Queens Park Rangers on 15 September 2018. Doidge scored his first goal for Bolton in a 1–1 draw against Rotherham United in October 2018.

On 6 January 2019, Forest Green Rovers chairman Dale Vince announced that Doidge's permanent transfer to Bolton would not be proceeding as planned, and that he would be returning to Forest Green. This was due to Bolton being under transfer embargo. Vince later accused Bolton of "contractual breaches" and claimed that Rovers had been paying the player's wages during the loan spell, commenting that he believed Bolton had "entered into a contract to loan and then buy Christian last August without the means to honour it, and perhaps the intention to do so as well." In May 2019, following Bolton's administration, he said he was "glad" that the transfer had fallen through. On 17 December 2019, Bolton and Forest Green came to an agreement over the transfer.

=== Hibernian ===
On 25 June 2019, Doidge signed for Scottish Premiership club Hibernian on a three-year contract. On 9 November 2019, he scored a hat-trick in a 4–1 win away to St Johnstone, his first league goals for the club and his first professional hat-trick. Doidge scored his second hat-trick for Hibs in a 4–2 victory against Dundee United, in the Scottish Cup 4th round, on 28 January, taking his tally for the season to 14.

Doidge missed much of pre-season during July 2021 due to suffering from the effects of COVID-19. He scored two goals in five games during the early part of the 2021–22 season, but then suffered an achilles tendon injury in August. While recovering from that injury he signed a new contract with Hibs, that is due to keep him at the club to the end of the 2023–24 season.

Doidge scored a hat-trick in the first match of the 2022–23 season, a 5–0 win against Clyde in the League Cup. On 31 August 2022, Doidge joined Kilmarnock on loan for the 2022–23 season.

=== Forest Green Rovers (second spell) ===
Doidge rejoined Forest Green Rovers on 31 January 2024. Local newspaper the Stroud Times celebrated his return with the headline "Quorn Again Christian". On 8 May 2026, the club announced it was releasing the player.

=== Newport County ===
On 24 June 2026 Doidge joined his home town club Newport County in EFL League Two. He made his debut for Newport against Wimbledon on 8 August 2026 in the EFL Cup first round which Newport lost 5-4 on penalties after drawing 1-1 in normal time.

== Other activities ==
Whilst playing semi-professional football for Carmarthen Town he worked for South Wales Police.

Doidge has also represented the Wales U18 national basketball team and played in the 2009 U18 European Championship.

== Career statistics ==
As of 10 October 2026

Appearances and goals by club, season and competition
Club	Season	League			National cup (Note: Includes Welsh Cup, FA Cup and Scottish Cup)		League cup (Note: Includes Welsh League Cup, EFL Cup and Scottish League Cup)		Other		Total	
Club	Season	Division	Apps	Goals	Apps	Goals	Apps	Goals	Apps	Goals	Apps	Goals
Barry Town	2011–12	Welsh League Division One										
Barry Town	2012–13	Welsh League Division One	11	7	3	3	1	0	0	0	15	10
Barry Town	Total		11	7	3	3	1	0	0	0	15	10
Carmarthen Town	2012–13	Welsh Premier League	12	2	0	0	1	0	1 (Note: Appearance in the Welsh Premier League UEFA Europa League play-offs)	0	14	2
Carmarthen Town	2013–14	Welsh Premier League	31	17	2	0	2	1	1	0	36	18
Carmarthen Town	Total		43	19	2	0	3	1	2	0	50	20
Dagenham & Redbridge	2014–15	League Two	11	2	1	0	0	0	1 (Note: Appearance(s) in the Football League Trophy)	0	13	2
Dagenham & Redbridge	2015–16	League Two	35	8	3	0	1	1	3	0	42	9
Dagenham & Redbridge	Total		46	10	4	0	1	1	4	0	55	11
Dartford (loan)	2014–15	Conference Premier	7	0	—		—		2 (Note: Appearances in FA Trophy)	0	9	0
Forest Green Rovers	2016–17	National League	41	25	1	0	—		7 (Note: Three appearances and two goals in the National League play-offs, four appearances in FA Trophy)	2	49	27
Forest Green Rovers	2017–18	League Two	42	20	3	4	1	0	3 (Note: Appearances in EFL Trophy)	1	49	25
Forest Green Rovers	2018–19	League Two	25	14	0	0	2	0	2 (Note: Appearances in League Two play-offs)	0	29	14
Forest Green Rovers	Total		108	59	4	4	3	0	12	3	127	66
Bolton Wanderers (loan)	2018–19	Championship	17	1	—		—		—		17	1
Hibernian	2019–20	Scottish Premiership	28	12	5 (Note: One appearance and goal in the 2019–20 Scottish Cup was in a match delayed until October 2020 due to the COVID-19 pandemic)	5	6	2	—		39	19
Hibernian	2020–21	Scottish Premiership	36	7	5	5	6	1	—		47	13
Hibernian	2021–22	Scottish Premiership	17	2	3	0	2	0	3 (Note: Appearances in the UEFA Europa Conference League)	0	25	2
Hibernian	2022–23	Scottish Premiership	5	0	0	0	4	3	—		9	3
Hibernian	2023–24	Scottish Premiership	18	3	1	1	3	0	6	1	28	5
Hibernian	Total		104	24	14	11	21	6	9	1	148	42
Kilmarnock (loan)	2022–23	Scottish Premiership	27	3	3	0	2	0	—		32	3
Forest Green Rovers	2023–24	League Two	18	3	—		—		—		18	3
Forest Green Rovers	2024–25	National League	24	8	2	2	—		4 (Note: One appearance in FA Trophy, three appearances and one goal in National League Cup)	1	30	11
Forest Green Rovers	2025–26	National League	19	1	0	0	1	0	0	0	20	1
Forest Green Rovers	Total		61	12	2	2	1	0	4	1	68	15
Newport County	2026–27	League Two	8	2	0	0	1	0	1	0	10	2
Career total			432	137	32	20	33	8	34	5	532	170

== Honours ==
Carmarthen Town

- Welsh League Cup: 2012–13, 2013–14

Individual

- Welsh Premier League Team of the Year: 2013–14
- Scottish Premiership player of the month: November 2019
- EFL League Two Player of the Month: November 2017
