= 2006–07 in Welsh football =

== National team ==
Wales failed to reach the 2006 FIFA World Cup.

== FAW Premier Cup ==
Losing semi-final teams each received £25,000. The losing finalists received £50,000 with the winners receiving £100,000. The New Saints won the FAW Premier Cup beating Newport County.

== Welsh Cup ==
The final was played on 6 May 2007 between Afan Lido and Carmarthen Town. Carmarthen Town won 3–2.

== Welsh League Cup ==
Caersws won the Welsh League cup by beating Rhyl in the final. The score at full-time was 1-1 but Caersws won 3–1 on penalties.

== Welsh Premier League ==
Llanelli won their first league title. Cwmbran Town were relegated to the Welsh Football League Division One

== Welsh Football League Division One ==
- Champions: Goytre United - did not apply for promotion to Welsh Premier League, Neath Athletic promoted to Welsh Premier League.

== Cymru Alliance League ==
- Champions: Prestatyn Town - did not apply for promotion to Welsh Premier League, Llangefni Town promoted to Welsh Premier League.
