= 2004–05 Welsh League Cup =

Football cup won by Carmarthen Town

Loosemores League Cup

Tournament details
- Country: Wales
- Teams: 20

Final positions
- Champions: Carmarthen Town
- Runners-up: Rhyl FC

Tournament statistics
- Matches played: 33
- Goals scored: 102 (3.09 per match)
- All statistics correct as of 17:00, 31 August 2009 (UTC).

The 2004–05 Welsh League Cup season was won by Carmarthen Town, beating Rhyl FC in the final. It was the first victory for Carmarthen Town in the competition, and the third appearance by Rhyl FC in the final. The final took place at Latham Park, in Newtown, Wales. The match was refereed by N L Morgan.

== Round and draw dates ==
Date	Event
17–25 August 2004	Preliminary Round
31 August - 1 September 2004	First round, first leg
7–15 September 2004	First round, second leg
19–20 October 2004	Second round, first leg
2–3 November 2004	Second round, second leg
15 February 2005	Semi-finals, first leg
1 March 2005	Semi-finals, second leg
2 May 2005	Final in Latham Park, Newtown

== Knockout stage ==
=== Preliminary round ===
Team 1	Agg.	Team 2	1st leg	2nd leg
Airbus UK	1–7	Welshpool Town	1-5	0-2
Carmarthen Town	11–4	Llanelli AFC	1-1	10-3

=== First round ===
Team 1	Agg.	Team 2	1st leg	2nd leg
Bangor City	5–7	Caernarfon Town	2-3	3-4
Connah's Quay Nomads	1–0	Total Network Solutions	1-0	0-0
Cwmbran Town	4–2	Caersws FC	2-1	2-1
Haverfordwest County	5–2	Aberystwyth Town	1-2	4-0
NEWI Cefn Druids	2–6	Rhyl FC	1-2	1-4
Newtown AFC	4–4(a)	Port Talbot Town	4-2	0-2
Carmarthen Town	1–0	Afan Lido	0-0	1-0
Porthmadog FC	2–1	Welshpool Town	1-0	1-1

=== Second round ===
Team 1	Agg.	Team 2	1st leg	2nd leg
Connah's Quay Nomads	3–5	Porthmadog FC	1-2	2-3
Port Talbot Town	4–3	Haverfordwest County	2-1	2-2
Caernarfon Town	1–1(a)	Rhyl FC	1-1	0-0
Carmarthen Town	4–3	Cwmbran Town	3-2	1-1

=== Semi-finals ===
Team 1	Agg.	Team 2	1st leg	2nd leg
Carmarthen Town	3–2	Porthmadog FC	1-0	2-2
Port Talbot Town	0–2	Rhyl FC	0-2	0-0

=== Final ===
2 May 2005
14:30 (UTC+0)

Carmarthen Town	2–0 (a.e.t.)	Rhyl FC
Richard Kennedy 101', Omar Abdillahi 104'	Report

Latham Park, Newtown
Attendance: 750
Referee: N L Morgan (Wales)

Welsh League Cup
2004–05 Winners

Carmarthen Town
First Title

== See also ==
- Welsh League Cup
- Welsh Premier League
- Welsh Cup
