= 2002–03 Welsh Premier League =

Welsh Premier League
- Season: 2002–03
- Champions: Barry Town
- Relegated: Llanelli
- Champions League: Barry Town
- UEFA Cup: Total Network Solutions; Cwmbran Town
- Intertoto Cup: Bangor City
- Matches played: 306
- Goals scored: 885 (2.89 per match)
- Top goalscorer: Graham Evans (24)

The 2002–03 Welsh Premier League was the 11th season of the Welsh Premier League since its establishment as the League of Wales in 1992. It began on 16 August 2002 and ended on 2 May 2003. The league was won for the third consecutive season by Barry Town, their seventh title.

== League table ==
Pos	Team	Pld	W	D	L	GF	GA	GD	Pts	Qualification or relegation
1	Barry Town (C)	34	26	5	3	84	26	+58	83	Qualification for Champions League first qualifying round
2	Total Network Solutions	34	24	8	2	68	21	+47	80	Qualification for UEFA Cup qualifying round
3	Bangor City	34	22	5	7	75	34	+41	71	Qualification for Intertoto Cup first round
4	Aberystwyth Town	34	17	9	8	54	38	+16	60	
5	Connah's Quay Nomads	34	18	5	11	55	46	+9	59	
6	Rhyl	34	17	7	10	52	33	+19	58	
7	Afan Lido	34	14	10	10	44	34	+10	52	
8	Caersws	34	15	6	13	57	52	+5	51	
9	Cwmbran Town	34	14	8	12	51	40	+11	50	Qualification for UEFA Cup qualifying round (Note: As 2002–03 Welsh Cup runners-up)
10	Newtown	34	12	6	16	48	54	−6	42	
11	Port Talbot Town	34	11	6	17	36	51	−15	39	
12	Flexsys Cefn Druids	34	11	5	18	37	51	−14	38	
13	Haverfordwest County	34	10	5	19	40	68	−28	35	
14	Caernarfon Town	34	8	10	16	43	53	−10	34	
15	Carmarthen Town	34	9	5	20	33	66	−33	32	
16	Oswestry Town (R)	34	6	10	18	36	67	−31	28	Merged with Total Network Solutions
17	Welshpool Town	34	7	7	20	30	62	−32	28	
18	Llanelli (R)	34	4	5	25	42	89	−47	17	Relegation to Welsh Division One

(C) Champions; (R) Relegated

== Results ==
Home \ Away	ABE	AFA	BAN	BAR	CAE	CWS	CMR	CDR	CQN	CWM	HAV	LLA	NTW	OSW	PTT	RHY	TNS	WEL
Aberystwyth Town		0–0	0–1	3–1	1–1	1–3	2–0	3–0	3–1	1–1	2–1	2–0	3–1	5–1	1–0	1–1	2–2	0–0
Afan Lido	1–1		1–2	0–1	0–1	1–0	2–0	0–3	3–0	1–2	0–0	2–2	1–2	0–0	2–0	1–1	0–6	2–0
Bangor City	0–1	2–1		1–1	3–1	5–0	3–2	2–0	2–1	2–1	2–1	8–0	0–1	2–2	3–0	1–0	0–2	3–1
Barry Town	5–1	1–0	3–0		3–2	3–2	3–0	6–0	3–1	2–1	3–0	1–0	2–2	4–0	0–1	4–1	0–0	2–1
Caernarfon Town	0–3	1–1	2–2	1–4		1–2	2–1	3–3	2–0	3–1	0–1	1–1	1–2	1–1	2–1	0–2	1–1	0–0
Caersws	2–2	1–2	1–1	0–1	2–1		4–1	2–1	1–0	1–1	1–1	4–0	1–0	2–3	3–1	2–2	0–4	3–1
Carmarthen Town	0–2	0–2	0–6	2–2	0–3	3–1		0–1	1–1	0–4	0–2	2–1	1–4	2–1	0–2	0–3	1–1	5–1
Flexsys Cefn Druids	3–0	0–1	0–2	0–3	2–1	0–1	0–1		0–0	1–0	0–1	4–0	3–0	0–0	3–2	0–2	0–1	0–2
Connah's Quay Nomads	2–1	2–1	2–1	0–2	1–1	1–3	1–0	4–1		1–1	3–1	3–0	1–0	2–4	2–2	2–1	0–1	4–0
Cwmbran Town	2–1	0–2	0–0	2–3	1–0	3–2	4–0	0–0	0–2		3–1	3–2	2–1	0–0	1–1	2–0	0–0	4–0
Haverfordwest County	0–3	1–4	0–4	2–4	3–1	3–2	0–2	2–4	1–3	4–0		2–3	2–2	0–2	2–1	1–5	0–3	0–0
Llanelli	2–3	1–3	2–5	2–3	3–3	3–2	1–2	3–1	3–5	0–3	1–3		2–3	3–1	0–2	0–3	2–3	0–1
Newtown	3–1	1–2	2–1	0–0	0–3	0–2	2–2	1–2	1–2	4–1	4–0	2–1		1–3	2–4	0–2	2–4	0–2
Oswestry Town	0–1	0–3	1–2	0–4	3–0	0–2	1–2	0–1	2–3	0–5	1–1	3–1	0–0		0–0	2–3	0–3	1–1
Port Talbot Town	0–1	0–2	0–2	0–5	3–2	0–0	0–2	2–1	0–1	1–0	3–0	1–1	0–2	4–1		0–3	1–1	1–0
Rhyl	0–0	2–2	0–1	0–1	1–0	4–0	1–0	1–0	1–2	2–1	1–0	1–1	1–2	1–1	3–0		0–1	2–0
Total Network Solutions	3–0	1–1	4–2	1–0	0–2	2–1	2–0	2–0	2–0	1–0	1–2	3–1	1–1	2–1	1–0	5–0		2–0
Welshpool Town	1–3	0–0	1–4	0–4	1–0	0–4	1–1	3–3	1–2	1–2	0–2	1–0	1–0	6–1	2–3	0–2	1–2	

Legend: Blue = home team win; Yellow = draw; Red = away team win.
