= 2005–06 FAW Premier Cup =

Tournament details
- Country: England; Wales
- Teams: 16

Final positions
- Champions: Swansea City
- Runner-up: Wrexham

Tournament statistics
- Matches played: 15

The 2005-06 FAW Premier Cup was the ninth season of the tournament since its founding in 1997.

== First round ==
Home	Score	Away
Caersws	5 - 1	Aberystwyth Town
Cwmbran Town	1 - 0	Merthyr Tydfil
Porthmadog	1 - 2	Carmarthen Town
Welshpool Town	0 - 2	Newtown

== Second round ==
Home	Score	Away
Bangor City	1 - 2	Carmarthen Town
Newport County	1 - 0	Caersws
Newtown	2 - 1	Haverfordwest County
Rhyl	1 - 0	Cwmbran Town

== Quarter finals ==
Home	Score	Away
Carmarthen Town	2 - 1	Cardiff City
Newport County	0 - 2	Wrexham
Newtown	2 - 5	Total Network Solutions
Rhyl	0 - 1	Swansea City

== Semi finals ==
Home	Score	Away
Carmarthen Town	2 - 3	Swansea City
Wrexham	3 - 3	Total Network Solutions

== Final ==
Home	Score	Away
Wrexham	1 - 2	Swansea City
