= 2018–19 Welsh League Cup =

Nathaniel MG Cup

Tournament details
- Country: Wales; England
- Dates: 28 August 2018 – 19 January 2019
- Teams: 28

Final positions
- Champions: Cardiff MU (1st title)
- Runner-up: Cambrian & Clydach Vale

Tournament statistics
- Matches played: 27
- Goals scored: 109 (4.04 per match)
- All statistics correct as of 19 January 2019.

The 2018–19 Welsh League Cup (known for sponsorship purposes as The Nathaniel MG Cup) was the 27th season of the Welsh League cup competition, which was established in 1992.

Played under a regionalised, knock-out format, the 2018–19 competition was the fifth to be held since the tournament was expanded to include clubs from outside the Welsh Premier League. As well as the 12 Welsh Premier League clubs from the previous season, the top five qualifying clubs from the northern and southern feeder leagues would enter the tournament, along with a number of wildcard entrants.

The trophy was won by Premier League side Cardiff Met. who defeated second tier Cambrian & Clydach Vale B. & G.C. 2–0 in Barry. It was the first time Met had won the cup and the first final appearance for Cambrian, who upset four-time defending champions The New Saints in the semi-finals.

== First round ==
Ties were played on 28 August 2018.

The semi-finalists from the previous season, The New Saints, Cardiff Met, Connah's Quay and Newtown received a bye to the second round.

Team 1	Score	Team 2
Bala Town	3–0	Guilsfield
Bangor City	0–1	Llandudno
Cambrian & Clydach Vale B. & G.C.	0–0 (a.e.t.) (3–1 p)	Barry Town United
Carmarthen Town	5–0	Goytre
Cefn Druids	3–4 (a.e.t.)	Airbus UK Broughton
Denbigh Town	2–3	Prestatyn Town
Flint Town United	3–2 (a.e.t.)	Holywell Town
Goytre United	3–1	Afan Lido
Haverfordwest County	3–0	Llanelli Town
Pen-y-Bont	3–1	Ton Pentre
Rhyl	4–2	Caernarfon Town
Welshpool Town	1–3	Aberystwyth Town

== Second round ==
The draw for this round was made on 31 August. Ties were played between 25 September and 3 October.

Team 1	Score	Team 2
Prestatyn Town	0–5	The New Saints
Connah's Quay Nomads	5–1	Airbus UK Broughton
Flint Town United	1–6	Bala Town
Rhyl	3–5	Llandudno
Cambrian & Clydach Vale B. & G.C.	3–1	Aberystwyth Town
Cardiff Met.	3–1	Carmarthen Town
Haverfordwest County	6–2	Goytre United
Newtown	1–0	Pen-y-Bont

== Quarter-finals ==
The draw for this round was made on 3 October, just prior to the last Second Round match between Prestatyn and The New Saints. Ties were played on 30 October.

Team 1	Score	Team 2
Bala Town	0–1	Connah's Quay Nomads
Llandudno	0–5	The New Saints
Cambrian & Clydach Vale B. & G.C.	1–0	Newtown
Cardiff Met.	6–0	Haverfordwest County

== Semi-finals ==
The draw for this round was made on 31 October. Ties were played on 23 and 24 November.

Team 1	Score	Team 2
Cambrian & Clydach Vale B. & G.C.	2–1	The New Saints
Connah's Quay Nomads	0–1	Cardiff Met.

== Final ==
The match was played on Saturday 19 January 2019 at Jenner Park, Barry and was shown live on S4C. This was the first time that the final was held at that ground.

19 January 2019
19:30

Cardiff Metropolitan University	2–0	Cambrian & Clydach Vale B. & G.C.
Adam Roscrow 40', 90+4'	Report

Jenner Park, Barry
Attendance: 1,509
Referee: Rob Jenkins
