= 2000–01 League of Wales =

League of Wales
- Season: 2000–01
- Champions: Barry Town
- Relegated: Inter Cardiff
- Champions League: Barry Town
- UEFA Cup: Cwmbran Town; Total Network Solutions
- Intertoto Cup: Carmarthen Town
- Matches: 306
- Goals: 1,030 (3.37 per match)
- Top goalscorer: Graham Evans (25)

The 2000–01 League of Wales was the ninth season of the League of Wales since its establishment in 1992. It began on 18 August 2000 and ended on 5 May 2001. The league was won by Barry Town, their fifth title.

== League table ==
Pos	Team	Pld	W	D	L	GF	GA	GD	Pts	Qualification or relegation
1	Barry Town (C)	34	24	5	5	84	30	+54	77	Qualification for Champions League first qualifying round
2	Cwmbran Town	34	24	2	8	71	34	+37	74	Qualification for UEFA Cup qualifying round
3	Carmarthen Town	34	17	7	10	68	39	+29	58	Qualification for Intertoto Cup first round
4	Newtown	34	18	4	12	48	37	+11	58	
5	Caersws	34	16	9	9	72	39	+33	57	
6	Aberystwyth Town	34	15	10	9	64	42	+22	55	
7	Rhyl	34	16	6	12	74	52	+22	54	
8	Total Network Solutions	34	15	9	10	64	47	+17	54	Qualification for UEFA Cup qualifying round (Note: As 2000–01 Welsh Cup runners-up)
9	Connah's Quay Nomads	34	14	8	12	45	47	−2	50	
10	Haverfordwest County	34	14	7	13	56	55	+1	49	
11	Afan Lido	34	13	8	13	42	37	+5	47	
12	Rhayader Town	34	10	10	14	54	65	−11	40	
13	Flexsys Cefn Druids	34	11	5	18	60	70	−10	38	
14	Bangor City	34	10	7	17	56	84	−28	37	
15	Oswestry Town	34	10	6	18	40	74	−34	36	
16	Port Talbot Athletic	34	10	5	19	49	77	−28	35	
17	Llanelli	34	9	2	23	57	97	−40	29	
18	UWIC Inter Cardiff (R)	34	3	4	27	26	104	−78	13	Relegation to Welsh Division One

Rules for classification: 1) points; 2) goal difference; 3) number of goals scored.
(C) Champions; (R) Relegated

== Results ==
Home \ Away	ABE	AFA	BAN	BAR	CWS	CMR	CDR	CQN	CWM	HAV	INC	LLA	NTW	OSW	PTT	RHA	RHY	TNS
Aberystwyth Town		1–1	0–2	3–2	2–2	2–2	3–0	1–1	2–0	0–2	5–0	6–0	3–0	6–0	1–0	2–2	2–2	2–0
Afan Lido	4–3		3–1	1–0	3–1	0–0	1–1	2–2	0–1	3–1	1–0	1–0	1–2	3–1	0–1	3–0	0–0	2–2
Bangor City	1–1	3–1		2–3	2–2	1–3	3–1	0–1	1–3	3–2	3–0	3–2	0–2	0–1	3–5	3–3	0–3	0–4
Barry Town	4–0	1–0	6–1		3–3	2–0	2–0	4–0	3–1	3–2	8–0	7–1	0–2	6–0	2–0	2–1	0–0	1–0
Caersws	1–1	0–1	5–0	2–2		2–2	1–2	0–0	1–4	0–1	6–1	4–0	1–0	1–0	7–1	2–2	2–1	0–1
Carmarthen Town	1–1	2–0	4–0	1–4	0–0		2–0	3–0	1–0	0–4	9–1	5–1	1–2	0–1	1–1	2–0	3–0	4–3
Flexsys Cefn Druids	4–1	2–3	2–0	1–2	1–4	3–4		1–2	0–3	3–3	3–0	5–1	0–1	3–7	3–2	3–2	2–1	2–1
Connah's Quay Nomads	1–2	1–0	1–1	0–1	0–3	2–1	2–0		1–0	0–0	2–0	2–1	0–0	0–2	1–3	5–0	1–2	1–2
Cwmbran Town	1–0	3–0	5–2	3–0	1–2	0–2	1–0	2–1		0–0	3–1	3–2	2–0	3–0	2–0	4–2	3–2	2–2
Haverfordwest County	1–3	0–0	0–1	2–2	2–1	3–1	2–0	2–0	0–2		3–1	3–3	0–3	2–1	2–3	0–4	2–4	0–2
Inter Cardiff	2–1	0–5	1–2	2–1	0–6	0–4	2–6	3–3	0–3	1–4		1–2	1–1	1–2	1–3	1–1	2–2	0–3
Llanelli	2–4	1–0	2–4	1–6	2–1	1–0	1–3	1–2	2–0	3–2	1–0		1–2	11–0	1–2	2–3	3–1	3–3
Newtown	1–2	1–0	3–2	0–2	0–2	2–1	2–1	2–3	2–3	0–1	3–0	4–1		2–0	2–1	1–2	2–0	3–1
Oswestry Town	1–2	1–0	3–3	0–1	0–1	0–0	0–0	1–3	0–1	2–5	1–0	5–2	1–0		2–2	2–2	0–3	0–3
Port Talbot Town	0–2	2–0	2–2	0–0	1–3	0–2	2–1	1–2	2–5	2–2	2–1	1–0	2–3	0–2		1–3	1–6	0–6
Rhayader Town	0–0	2–0	2–4	0–1	0–2	0–1	1–1	1–1	0–2	1–2	2–0	4–2	2–0	3–2	3–2		0–2	2–2
Rhyl	1–0	0–2	6–1	1–2	2–1	2–1	5–3	3–4	2–5	3–0	1–2	7–0	0–0	1–1	4–3	5–1		2–0
Total Network Solutions	1–0	1–1	2–2	0–1	1–3	1–5	3–3	2–0	1–0	0–1	2–1	3–1	0–0	4–1	2–1	3–3	3–0	

Legend: Blue = home team win; Yellow = draw; Red = away team win.
