= Deryn Brace =

Welsh footballer and manager

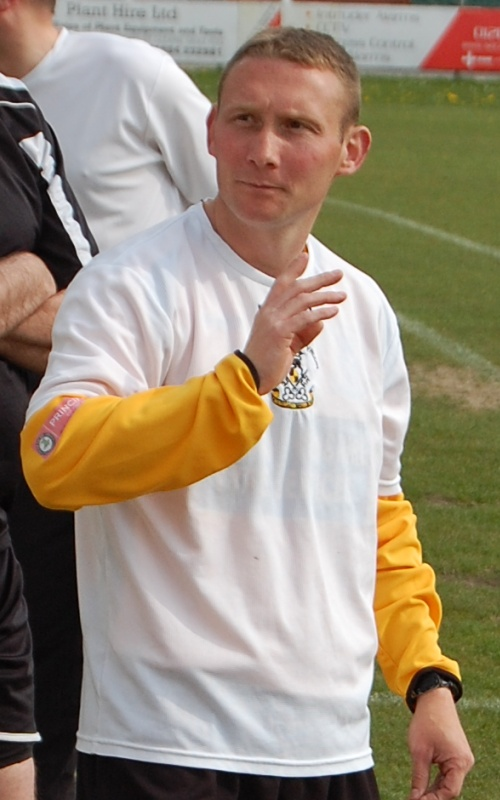

Personal information
- Full name: Deryn Paul John Brace
- Date of birth: 15 March 1975 (age 51)
- Place of birth: Haverfordwest, Wales
- Height: 5 ft 7 in (1.70 m)
- Position: Defender

Youth career
- 19??–1993: Norwich City

Senior career*
Years	Team	Apps	(Gls)
1993–1994	Norwich City	0	(0)
1994–2000	Wrexham	89	(2)
2000	Llanelli	2	(0)
2000–2001	Carmarthen Town	13	(1)
2001–2006	Haverfordwest County	130	(0)
2006–2011	Carmarthen Town	44	(0)
2011–2012	Tenby	2	(0)
2012–2013	Haverfordwest County	4	(0)

International career
1992	Wales U18	1	(0)
1994–1997	Wales U21	8	(0)

Managerial career
- 2002–2006: Haverfordwest County
- 2007–2010: Carmarthen Town
- * Club domestic league appearances and goals as of 2 May 2010

Deryn Brace (born 15 March 1975) is a Welsh footballer.

== Career ==
Born in Haverfordwest, Brace began his career as a trainee with Norwich City, turning professional in July 1993. He left in April 1994 to join Wrexham having failed to make the first team at Carrow Road. He spent six years with Wrexham, playing in over 100 league games, and also playing in the European Cup Winners Cup and in an FA Cup quarter final. He won ten Under 21 caps for Wales and only missed a full cap through illness, having contracted pneumonia.

He was released by Wrexham in May 2000 and early in the following season joined Llanelli. Later that season he moved to Carmarthen Town and during the 2001–02 season left to join Haverfordwest County. In June 2002 he was appointed player-manager of Haverfordwest, at the age of just 27 years, guiding them to a UEFA Cup spot in his second season in charge. He also works full-time as postman and stepped down from his manager's post due to his work commitments in October 2006. He initially remained as player, but was released later that month by new manager Derek Brazil and rejoined Carmarthen Town.

He was appointed as player-manager of Carmarthen in May 2007, where he remained for three years before stepping down in June 2010.

== Managerial statistics ==
As of 8 June 2010

Team	Country	From	To	Record				
Team	Country	From	To	G	W	D	L	Win %
Haverfordwest County	(Wales)	June 2002	4 October 2006	168	66	50	52	39.29
Carmarthen Town	(Wales)	23 May 2007	8 June 2010	126	46	32	48	36.51
Total				294	112	82	100	38.1
