= 2006–07 FAW Premier Cup =

Tournament details
- Country: England; Wales
- Teams: 16

Final positions
- Champions: The New Saints
- Runners-up: Newport County

Tournament statistics
- Matches played: 15
- Goals scored: 46 (3.07 per match)

The 2006–07 FAW Premier Cup was the tenth season of the tournament since its founding in 1997. The New Saints were the eventual winners, beating Newport County 1–0 in the final to win the competition for the first time in the club's history. Losing semi-final teams each receive £25,000. The losing finalists receive £50,000 with the winners receiving £100,000.

== First round ==
Home	Score	Away
Bangor City	3–1	Caersws
NEWI Cefn Druids	3–2	Welshpool Town
Porthmadog	1–0	Aberystwyth Town
Haverfordwest County	1–2	Port Talbot Town

== Second round ==
Home	Score	Away
Carmarthen Town	3–1	Bangor City
NEWI Cefn Druids	1–2	Newport County
Porthmadog	2–1	Llanelli
Port Talbot Town	2–1	Rhyl

== Later rounds ==
Quarter finals
Carmarthen Town	2
Cardiff City	3
Porthmadog	1
The New Saints	3
Newport County	2
Wrexham	1
Port Talbot Town	2
Swansea City	1

Semi finals
Cardiff City	0
The New Saints	1
Newport County	2
Port Talbot Town	1

Final
Newport County	0
The New Saints	1

== Final ==
21 March 2007
19:00

Newport County	0–1	The New Saints
	Report	Beck 6'

Newport Stadium, Newport
Attendance: 1,809
