= 2003–04 Welsh Premier League =

Welsh Premier League
- Season: 2003–04
- Champions: Rhyl
- Relegated: Barry Town
- Champions League: Rhyl
- UEFA Cup: Total Network Solutions; Haverfordwest County
- Intertoto Cup: Aberystwyth Town
- Matches played: 272
- Goals scored: 854 (3.14 per match)
- Top goalscorer: Graham Evans (24)

The 2003–04 Welsh Premier League was the 12th season of the Welsh Premier League since its establishment as the League of Wales in 1992. It began on 15 August 2003 and ended on 1 May 2004. The league was won by Rhyl. Defending champions Barry Town F.C. were relegated after seven league championships and ten seasons in the Premiership.

== League table ==
Pos	Team	Pld	W	D	L	GF	GA	GD	Pts	Qualification or relegation
1	Rhyl (C)	32	23	8	1	76	26	+50	77	Qualification for Champions League first qualifying round
2	Total Network Solutions	32	24	4	4	77	28	+49	76	Qualification for UEFA Cup first qualifying round
3	Haverfordwest County	32	17	11	4	40	23	+17	62	Qualification for UEFA Cup first qualifying round
4	Aberystwyth Town	32	18	5	9	59	39	+20	59	Qualification for Intertoto Cup first round
5	Caersws	32	15	10	7	63	41	+22	55	
6	Bangor City	32	16	6	10	72	47	+25	54	
7	Cwmbran Town	32	15	3	14	51	44	+7	48	
8	Connah's Quay Nomads	32	11	9	12	58	55	+3	42	
9	Caernarfon Town	32	11	9	12	65	65	0	42	
10	Newtown	32	12	5	15	43	50	−7	41	
11	Port Talbot Town	32	11	6	15	41	51	−10	39	
12	Porthmadog	32	11	3	18	41	55	−14	36	
13	NEWI Cefn Druids	32	11	2	19	44	59	−15	35	
14	Afan Lido	32	8	8	16	31	54	−23	32	
15	Welshpool Town	32	6	7	19	35	71	−36	25	
16	Carmarthen Town	32	3	11	18	28	69	−41	20	
17	Barry Town (R)	32	3	7	22	30	77	−47	16	Relegation to Welsh Division One

Rules for classification: 1) points; 2) goal difference; 3) number of goals scored.
(C) Champions; (R) Relegated

== Results ==
Home \ Away	ABE	AFA	BAN	BAR	CAE	CWS	CMR	CDR	CQN	CWM	HAV	NTW	PTT	POR	RHY	TNS	WEL
Aberystwyth Town		1–2	1–2	3–1	2–1	2–0	5–1	1–0	2–1	1–0	1–1	2–1	1–1	1–0	2–2	0–3	5–0
Afan Lido	0–1		0–0	1–1	0–1	0–0	3–3	3–1	2–0	0–4	0–0	0–1	1–2	1–0	1–2	2–3	1–0
Bangor City	2–3	3–0		2–1	1–1	1–1	2–2	0–3	2–1	7–2	3–3	2–1	1–2	4–1	2–3	0–1	5–0
Barry Town	1–2	0–1	0–3		0–5	1–3	0–0	0–1	0–2	0–2	0–2	3–2	3–1	2–3	0–3	2–3	5–4
Caernarfon Town	3–2	2–2	4–5	8–0		2–4	1–1	3–2	5–5	1–0	0–1	0–3	2–0	0–2	1–1	2–2	4–1
Caersws	0–0	2–2	1–4	1–0	2–2		3–0	3–1	0–1	4–1	0–0	4–0	1–0	3–2	3–3	0–2	3–0
Carmarthen Town	1–2	2–1	1–4	0–0	1–4	1–7		2–0	2–2	0–2	0–1	0–1	1–2	1–0	0–0	1–4	0–2
NEWI Cefn Druids	1–3	5–3	1–5	2–1	1–3	2–2	2–2		1–2	0–2	1–0	2–1	0–1	3–0	0–2	0–2	4–2
Connah's Quay Nomads	0–4	4–0	3–2	4–1	3–0	3–5	1–1	0–1		3–2	0–1	2–3	3–1	1–3	0–2	1–1	1–1
Cwmbran Town	2–1	4–1	1–2	2–1	0–1	2–2	3–1	0–2	3–3		0–1	1–2	3–0	1–0	1–1	0–1	2–1
Haverfordwest County	3–1	0–0	1–0	2–2	1–1	3–0	1–0	1–0	1–2	2–1		1–0	1–1	1–0	2–1	1–0	1–1
Newtown	1–1	2–0	2–5	3–0	2–0	0–0	1–1	2–3	2–1	1–3	1–1		1–0	1–0	0–2	2–5	1–0
Port Talbot Town	1–3	0–2	0–0	2–2	4–1	0–2	3–1	3–2	1–1	2–3	2–0	2–0		3–2	1–2	1–4	0–1
Porthmadog	2–1	2–0	0–1	2–2	3–2	2–3	3–1	3–1	1–1	0–2	0–2	3–2	1–2		0–2	1–1	3–0
Rhyl	5–3	3–0	2–0	4–0	7–1	2–1	4–0	2–0	1–1	1–0	1–1	1–1	2–1	6–1		1–0	3–0
Total Network Solutions	1–0	5–0	2–1	3–0	4–1	1–3	4–0	2–1	3–2	2–1	2–0	2–1	2–0	4–0	2–3		1–1
Welshpool Town	0–2	0–2	3–1	1–1	3–3	1–0	1–1	3–1	1–4	0–1	2–4	3–2	2–2	0–1	1–2	0–5	

Legend: Blue = home team win; Yellow = draw; Red = away team win.
