= 2000–01 FAW Premier Cup =

Tournament details
- Country: England; Wales
- Teams: 12

Final positions
- Champions: Wrexham
- Runner-up: Swansea City

The 2000–01 FAW Premier Cup was the fourth season of the tournament since its founding in 1997. It was won by Wrexham, their third win in four seasons.

== Group stage ==
=== Group A ===
Team	Pld	W	D	L	GF	GA	GD	Pts	WRE	CAR	ABE	BAN
Wrexham	6	5	1	0	19	1	+18	16	—	3–0	4–0	4–0
Carmarthen Town	6	3	1	2	9	9	0	10	0–1	—	0–1	1–0
Aberystwyth Town	6	2	1	3	4	7	−3	7	1–1	1–2	—	3–1
Bangor City	6	0	1	5	3	18	−15	1	0–6	1–1	1–3	—

=== Group B ===
Team	Pld	W	D	L	GF	GA	GD	Pts	CFC	MER	LLA	CMT
Cardiff City	6	6	0	0	12	4	+8	18	—	2–1	2–1	1–0
Merthyr Tydfil	6	3	0	3	10	11	−1	9	0–2	—	2–1	3–1
Llanelli	6	2	0	4	13	14	−1	6	2–3	4–2	—	1–5
Cwmbrân Town	6	1	0	5	7	13	−6	3	0–2	1–2	0–4	—

=== Group C ===
Team	Pld	W	D	L	GF	GA	GD	Pts	BAR	SWA	TNS	CQN
Barry Town	6	5	1	0	13	5	+8	16	—	3–2	4–2	2–0
Swansea City	6	3	2	1	12	8	+4	11	1–1	—	1–1	1–0
Total Network Solutions	6	2	1	3	9	8	+1	7	0–1	1–2	—	4–0
Connah's Quay Nomads	6	0	0	6	2	15	−13	0	0–2	2–5	0–1	—

== Quarter finals ==
Home	Result	Away
Swansea City	1 - 0	Carmarthen Town
Wrexham	3 - 0	Aberystwyth Town
Cardiff City	0 - 1	Merthyr Tydfil
Barry Town	3 - 2	Total Network Solutions

== Semi-finals ==
Home	Result	Away
Barry Town	1 - 3	Wrexham
Merthyr Tydfil	0 - 2	Swansea City
Swansea City	2 - 0	Merthyr Tydfil
Wrexham	4 - 2	Barry Town

== Final ==
Home	Result	Away
Swansea City	0 - 2	Wrexham
