= 2005–06 in Welsh football =

This article lists major events during the 2005-06 season in Welsh football.

== National team ==
Wales failed to qualify for the World Cup held in Germany. John Toshack's side had finished 2nd bottom of a group that contained England, Poland, Austria, Northern Ireland, Azerbaijan and themselves. The side only managed to beat Azerbaijan and draw with Northern Ireland.

== Welsh Cup ==
Rhyl beat Bangor City 2–0 in the final of the Welsh Cup.

== Welsh League Cup ==
Total Network Solutions beat Port Talbot Town 4–0 in the final of the Welsh League Cup.

== Welsh Premier League ==
Total Network Solutions won the Welsh Premier League and the full-time professional club met Liverpool in the UEFA Champions League qualifiers in the summer of 2005. TNS lost both legs 3–0. In May 2006 the club changed their name to The New Saints F.C.

Llanelli revealed plans to become only the 2nd full-time side in the League of Wales. Llanelli then finished in their highest ever position in the league of Wales.

- Relegated to Welsh Football League Division One: Cardiff Grange Quins

== Welsh Football League Division One ==
- Champions: Goytre United - did not apply for promotion to Welsh Premier League

== Cymru Alliance League ==
- Champions: Glantraeth - did not apply for promotion to Welsh Premier League

== FA Cup ==
Due to the Wembley Stadium undergoing extensive rebuilding work, the FA Cup was held at the Millennium Stadium in Cardiff. Liverpool won the 2006 cup. From 2007 on the FA Cup was played at the new Wembley stadium.
