= 2012–13 Welsh League Cup =

Loosemores League Cup

Tournament details
- Country: Wales; England
- Teams: 20

Final positions
- Champions: Carmarthen Town (2nd title)
- Runners-up: The New Saints

The 2012–13 Welsh League Cup was the 21st season of the Welsh League Cup, which was established in 1992. A new format was introduced with eight feeder league clubs involved for the first time. The winners progressed into the second round, alongside the twelve Welsh Premier League clubs. Carmarthen Town won the competition, after beating The New Saints in a penalty shoot-out after a 3–3 draw in the final.

== First round ==
4 September	Buckley Town	1–2	Penrhyncoch	Globe Way, Buckley
19:45		Report

4 September	Cambrian & Clydach Vale	0–4	Haverfordwest County	King George V, Clydach Vale
19:45		Report

4 September	Rhyl	2–0	Porthmadog	Belle Vue, Rhyl
19:45		Report

4 September	Taff's Well	2–2 (2–3 p)	Bryntirion Athletic	Rhiw Dda'r, Taff's Well
19:45		Report

Source: welsh-premier.com

== Second round ==
9 October	Bala Town	6–1	Bangor City	Maes Tegid, Bala
19:30	Hunt 12'; Jones 41'; Brown 42'; Jones 57'; Hoy 84' (o.g.); Hunt 90'	Report	Owen 50'	Attendance: 175; Referee: Nick Pratt

9 October	Bryntirion Athletic	1–2	Carmarthen Town	Bryntirion Park, Bridgend
19:30	Jones 90'	Report	Thomas 23', 36'

2 October	Haverfordwest County	3–5	Llanelli	Bridge Meadow Stadium, Haverfordwest
19:30	Williams 53'; Walters 89'; O'Sullivan 90' (pen.)	Report	Grist 18'; Moses 21'; Rose 26'; Venables 54'; Bowen 75'	Attendance: 58; Referee: Bryn Markham-Jones

2 October	Newtown	4–5 (a.e.t.)	Afan Lido	Latham Park, Newtown
19:30	Jones 9', 77', 109'; Blenkinsop 109'	Report	Jones 14', 84', 91', 99'; Howard 90'	Attendance: 124; Referee: Mark Whitby

9 October	Penrhyncoch	0–1	Airbus UK	Cae Barker, Penrhyncoch
19:30		Report	Budrys 45'

25 September	Port Talbot Town	2–2 (5–4 p)	Aberystwyth Town	Victoria Road, Port Talbot
19:30	Blain 43'; Wood 86' (o.g.)	Report	Thomas 65'; Hughes 80'	Attendance: 140; Referee: Kris Hames

2 October	Prestatyn Town	0–2	The New Saints	Bastion Road, Prestatyn
19:30		Report	Fraughan 3', 30'	Attendance: 134; Referee: Kevin Parry

25 September	Rhyl	1–3	Connah's Quay	Belle Vue, Rhyl
19:30	Lewis 69'	Report	Healy 29', 67'; Beck 63'	Attendance: 204; Referee: Lee Evans

Source: welsh-premier.com

== Third round ==
9 October	Llanelli	6–3	Afan Lido	Stebonheath Park, Llanelli
19:30	Davies 35'; Moses 41'; Kellaway 66'; Corbisiero 68'; Grist 83'; Venables 90'	Report	Hartshorn 54'; K. Howard 57'; Jefferies 76'	Attendance: 87; Referee: Bryn Markham-Jones

30 October	Bala Town	2–3	The New Saints	Maes Tegid, Bala
19:30	Sheridan 70'; M. Jones 74'	Report	Draper 6'; Baker 25', 76'	Attendance: 188

30 October	Carmarthen Town	3–2	Port Talbot Town	Richmond Park, Carmarthen
19:30	Thomas 55', 61'; McCreesh 69'	Report	Blain 4'; Parry 9'	Attendance: 147

30 October	Connah's Quay	1–3 (a.e.t.)	Airbus UK	Deeside Stadium, Connah's Quay
19:45	C. Jones 55'	Report	Kearney 41'; Abbot 110'; Hayes 113'	Attendance: 138

Source: welsh-premier.com

== Semifinals ==
8 November	Carmarthen Town	2–1	Llanelli	Richmond Park, Carmarthen
19:30	Thomas 28'; Alsop 69'	Report	Corbisiero 17'	Attendance: 197; Referee: Dean John

8 November	The New Saints	5–2	Airbus UK	Park Hall, Oswestry
19:45	Fraughan 30'; Marriott 40'; Seargeant 63' (pen.); Darlington 90+1'; Lampkin 90+2'	Report	Holmes 13'; Hayes 48'	Attendance: 311; Referee: Lee Evans

Source: welsh-premier.com

== Final ==
12 January 2013
15:00

Carmarthen Town	3–3 (a.e.t.)	The New Saints
Hughes 42'; C. Thomas 60', 67'	Report	Evans 7'; Finley 58'; Wilde 84'
Penalties
Hicks (penalty missed); C. Thomas (penalty scored); L. Thomas (penalty scored); Hanford (penalty scored)	3–1	(penalty missed) Fraughan; (penalty scored) Darlington; (penalty missed) Seargeant; (penalty missed) Harrison

Latham Park, Newtown
Attendance: 455
Referee: Nick Pratt (Connah's Quay)
