= Richmond Park, Carmarthen =

Sporting stadium in Carmarthen, Wales

Richmond Park
- Parc Waun Dew (Welsh)
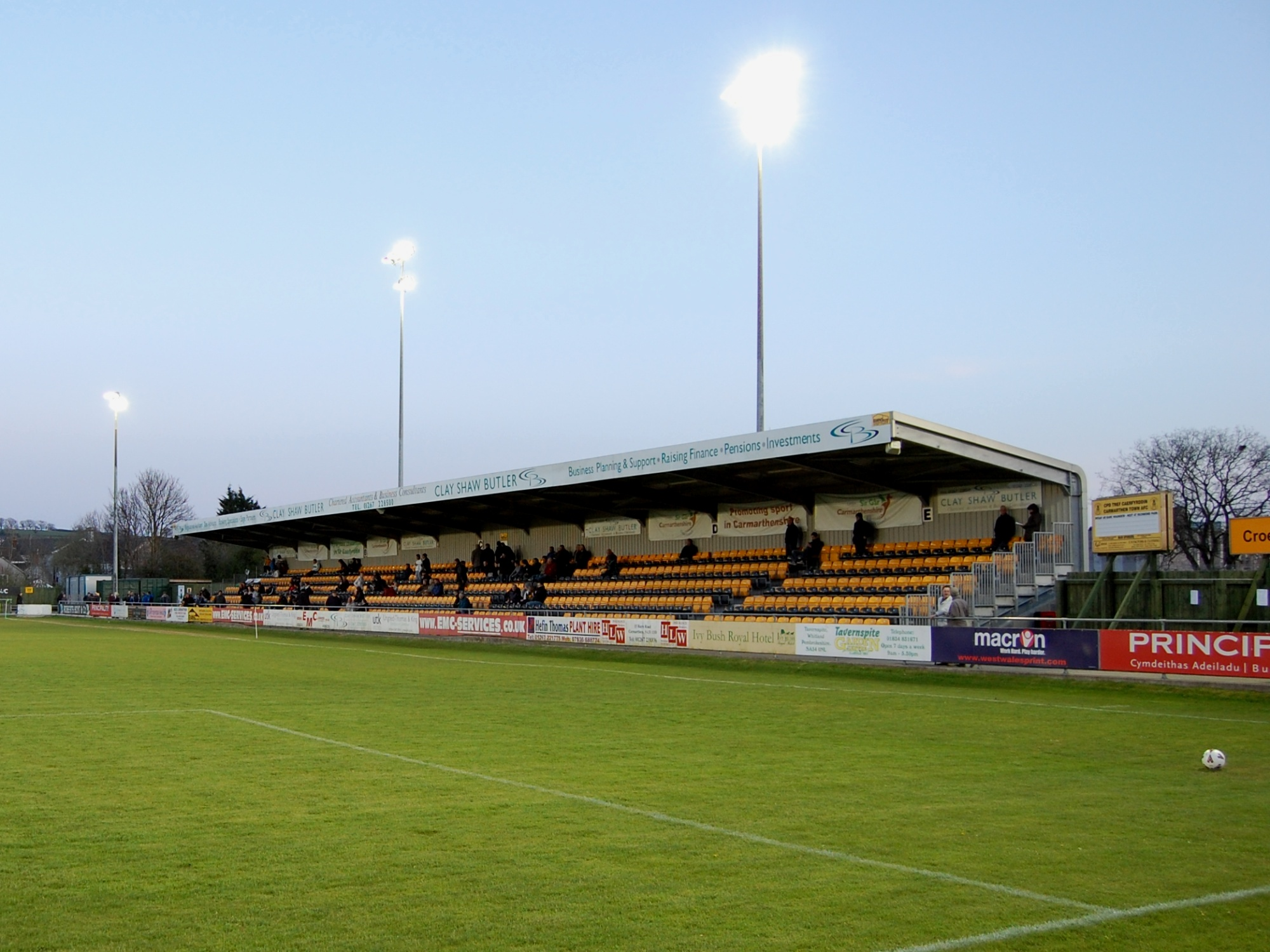
- UEFA Category 1 Stadium
- Interactive map of Richmond Park
- Location: Richmond Park; Priory Street; Carmarthen; SA31 1HZ
- Coordinates: 51.85994°N 4.30225°W
- Capacity: 3000 (1000 Seated)
- Surface: 3G
- Field size: 103 by 65 metres (113 by 71 yd)

Construction
- Built: 1952
- Renovated: 2003, 2012

Tenant
- Carmarthen Town A.F.C. (1952-present)

Richmond Park is a football stadium in Carmarthen, Wales. Situated on Priory Street, it is currently used for football matches and is the home ground of Carmarthen Town AFC. Since 2023, it has also been known as Stadiwm LHP or LHP Stadium for sponsorship reasons.

The stadium holds 3,000 people with 1,000 seats in the Clay Shaw Butler stand. The stand is arranged with 1,000 yellow and black seats in rows, matching the colour of the home team's kit.

== History ==
The club announced they would be installing a 3G all-weather pitch for the 2017/18 season. Carmarthen Town began the season with a number of games away from their Richmond Park home due these pitch renovations. With the new pitch the 'Old Gold' joined a growing list of Welsh Premier League clubs to install a 3G/4G pitch.

Richmond Park has been used for a number of International football matches. The majority of these have featured Wales national football team sides. The first match was against Scotland on 20 May 2003 which ended in a 2–1 victory for Wales.

20 May 2003 Four Nations Tournament (Semi-Pro)	Wales	2 – 1	Scotland	Carmarthen
	Lloyd 2', 88'	Report	McKenzie 22'	Stadium: Richmond Park; Referee: Lee Probert (England)

20 February 2007 Under-17 International Friendly	Wales	2 – 1	Denmark	Carmarthen
18:00		Report		Stadium: Richmond Park; Referee: S L Evans (Wales); Assistant referees: K Morgan (Wales), P Thomas (Wales)

12 November 2008 Women International Friendly	Wales	1 – 2	Finland	Carmarthen
19:30		Report		Stadium: Richmond Park; Referee: Dean John (Wales); Assistant referees: Gareth Ayres (Wales), Hywel James (Wales)

8 September 2009 Semi-Pro Under-23 Friendly	Wales	1 – 2	Poland	Carmarthen
19:30		Report		Stadium: Richmond Park; Referee: Dean John (Wales); Assistant referees: Richard Harrington (Wales), Ian Hollyoak (Wales)

28 September 2009 2010 UEFA European Under-17; Championship Qualifying Round	Wales	3 – 2	Iceland	Carmarthen
19:00 CET	Newall 50'; Amadi-Holloway 51'; Peniket 68'	Report; Report	59' Fridjonsson; 66' Emilsson	Stadium: Richmond Park; Referee: Matej Jug (Slovenia)

3 October 2009 2010 UEFA European Under-17; Championship Qualifying Round	Bosnia and Herzegovina	1 – 1	Iceland	Carmarthen
16:00 CET	Bevab 40'	Report	69' Gunnarsson	Stadium: Richmond Park; Referee: Christopher Lautier (Malta)

20 October 2010 2011 UEFA European Under-19; Championship qualification	Wales	3 – 3	Turkey	Carmarthen
18:00	Holloway 57'; Bradshaw 90+1'; Matthews 90+4' (pen.)	Report; Report	7' Bekdemir; 59' Özbek; 61' Demir	Stadium: Richmond Park; Referee: Radek Matějek (Czech Republic)

25 October 2010 2011 UEFA European Under-19; Championship qualification	Iceland	1 – 2	Turkey	Carmarthen
18:00	Emilsson 48'	Report	57' Demir; 90+4' Sarı	Stadium: Richmond Park; Referee: Radek Matějek (Czech Republic)

2 April 2011 2011 UEFA Women's Under-19; Championship Second qualifying round	Germany	2 – 0	Turkey	Carmarthen
15:00	Beckmann 36'; Simon 51'	Report		Stadium: Richmond Park; Referee: Anastasia Pustovoitova (Russia); Assistant referees: Sabina Valieva (Russia), Richard Harrington (Wales); Fourth official: Brian James (WAL) (Wales)

5 April 2011 2011 UEFA Women's Under-19; Championship Second qualifying round	Turkey	0 – 2	Wales	Carmarthen
19:00		Report; Report	62' Green	Stadium: Richmond Park; Referee: Katalin Kulcsar (Hungary); Assistant referees: Katalin Emese Torok (Hungary), Ekaterina Marinova (Bulgaria); Fourth official: Donka Jeleva-Terzieva (Bulgaria)

9 August 2012 Women Under-17 International Friendly	Wales	0 – 2	Poland	Carmarthen
18:00		Report	19'; 44'	Stadium: Richmond Park; Referee: Eddie King (Wales); Assistant referees: Tom Bevan (Wales), Ryan Kenny (Wales); Fourth official: Daniel Beckett (Wales)

19 September 2012 Under-17 International Friendly	Wales	4 – 0	Liechtenstein	Carmarthen
18:00	Atyeo 2'; Charles 12'; Copp 20'; O.Jones 68'	Report		Stadium: Richmond Park; Referee: Bryn Markham-Jones (Wales); Assistant referees: Ian Bird (Wales), David Morgan (Wales); Fourth official: Aled R.Jones (Wales)

22 August 2013 2013 UEFA Women's; Under-19 Championship	Wales	0 – 3	England	Carmarthen
14:00		Report	63' Lawley; 83' Parris; 89' Mead	Stadium: Richmond Park; Referee: Dilan Deniz Gökçek (Turkey)

22 August 2013 2013 UEFA Women's; Under-19 Championship	Finland	1 – 0	Norway	Carmarthen
19:00	Engman 78'	Report		Stadium: Richmond Park; Referee: Petra Chudá (Slovakia)

25 August 2013 2013 UEFA Women's; Under-19 Championship	Finland	1 – 1	Germany	Carmarthen
15:00	Kemppi 48'	Report	20' Tietge	Stadium: Richmond Park; Referee: Eleni Lampadariou (Greece)

28 August 2013 2013 UEFA Women's; Under-19 Championship	England	4 – 0	Finland	Carmarthen
19:00	Mead 15', 40'; Williams 34' (pen.); Sigsworth 66'	Report		Stadium: Richmond Park; Referee: Eleni Lampadariou (Greece)

== Records ==
The highest attendance recorded at Richmond Park is 911, for Carmarthen's League of Wales match against Barry Town, on 10 September 1997.

The stadium hosted its first European football match in July 2007 when Carmarthen Town entertained Norwegian side SK Brann in a UEFA Cup qualification match.

== Transport ==
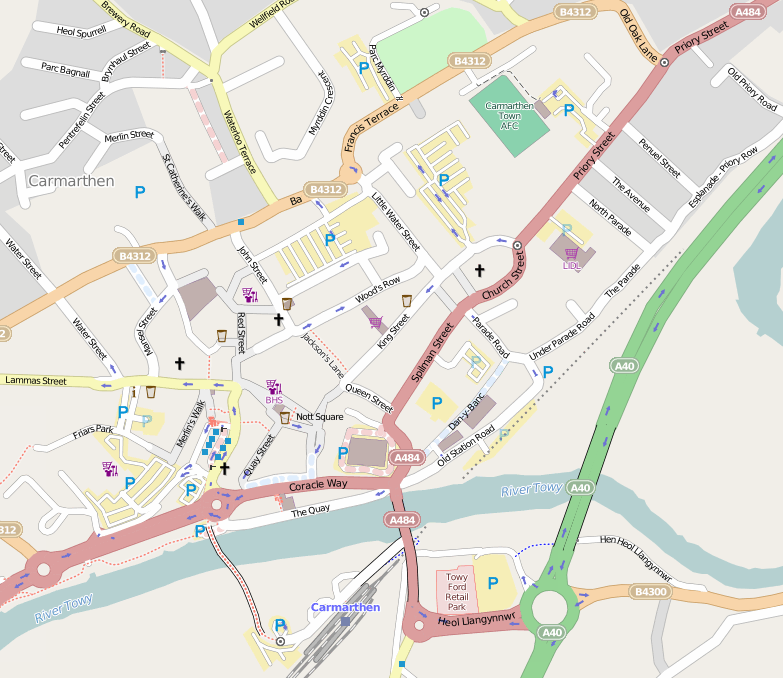
A map of Carmarthen Town and surrounding connections to Richmond Park.

Richmond Park is located to the north east of Carmarthen town centre and is easily accessible on foot, by road or by rail. Directly adjacent to the ground, on either side, are two public car parks; St Peter's car park has 435 parking spaces and Priory Street car park (situated next to the club house) has 53 spaces.

Carmarthen railway station is approximately 0.6 miles (1 km) from Richmond Park and serves trains from Manchester, Swansea, Fishguard, Pembroke Dock and Milford Haven. Carmarthen bus station is also approximately 0.6 miles (1 km) from the ground and serves many bus routes that operate throughout South Wales and beyond.

== Gallery ==
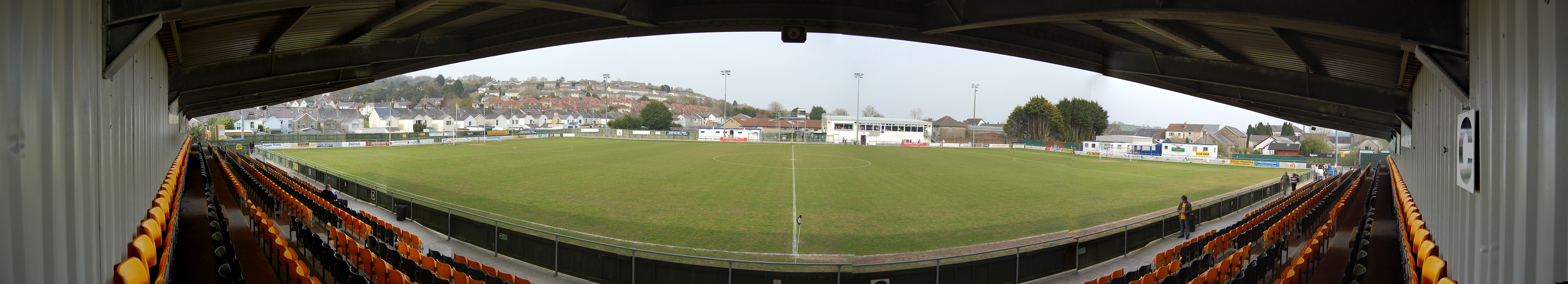
A panoramic view from the Clay Shaw Butler Stand.

== See also ==
- List of stadia in Wales by capacity
