= 2013–14 Welsh League Cup =

Loosemores League Cup

Tournament details
- Country: Wales; England
- Teams: 20

Final positions
- Champions: Carmarthen Town
- Runners-up: Bala Town

Tournament statistics
- Matches played: 19
- Goals scored: 67 (3.53 per match)

The 2013–14 Welsh League Cup was the 22nd season of the Welsh League Cup, which was established in 1992. The format remained the same as last year with the twelve teams from the Welsh Premier League and eight feeder league clubs.

== First round ==
The matches were played on 3 and 4 September 2013.

Team 1	Score	Team 2
Bala Town	3−1	Bangor City
Rhyl	2−0	Cefn Druids
Buckley Town	1−2	Conwy Borough
Gap Connah's Quay	2−1 (a.e.t.)	Prestatyn Town
Haverfordwest County	0−3	Aberdare Town
Aberystwyth Town	2−3	Cambrian & Clydach Vale
Newtown	1−2	Port Talbot Town
Afan Lido	4−3	Taff's Well

== Second round ==
The matches were played on 24 and 25 September 2013.

Team 1	Score	Team 2
Aberdare Town	0−2	Port Talbot Town
Afan Lido	1−2	Cambrian & Clydach Vale
Conwy Borough	2−4	Bala Town
Rhyl	2−0	Gap Connah's Quay

Byes: Airbus UK Broughton, Caersws, Carmarthen Town and The New Saints

== Third round ==
The matches were played on 23 and 30 October 2013.

Team 1	Score	Team 2
Rhyl	2−3	Bala Town
Cambrian & Clydach Vale	2−1	Port Talbot Town
Airbus UK Broughton	2−1	The New Saints
Caersws	0−5	Carmarthen Town

== Semi-finals ==
The matches were played on 12 November 2013.

Team 1	Score	Team 2
Carmarthen Town	3−2	Cambrian & Clydach Vale
Bala Town	2−1	Airbus UK Broughton

== Final ==
The match was played on 11 January 2014 at Park Avenue, the ground of Aberystwyth Town,
and was televised live by S4C Sgorio with a 3.00pm kick-off.

Team 1	Score	Team 2
Bala Town	0−0 (a.e.t.) (1−3 p)	Carmarthen Town
