= FAW Premier Cup =

- Founded: 1997
- Abolished: 2008
- Teams: 16
- Last champions: Newport County
- Most championships: Wrexham (5 titles)

The FAW Premier Cup (until 1998 the FAW Invitation Cup) was a Welsh football cup competition, organised annually by the Football Association of Wales from 1997 to 2008. Since the FAW excluded clubs playing in English leagues (including six Welsh clubs) from playing in the Welsh Cup from 1996 onwards, the FAW needed another competition where the best Welsh teams could compete.

The original format incorporated the three Welsh clubs then playing in the Football League (Cardiff City, Swansea City and Wrexham) along with Merthyr Tydfil and four League of Wales clubs (now the Cymru Premier). Until the 2001–02 season, Merthyr Tydfil had a guaranteed place, as Newport County and Colwyn Bay were not invited to take part. From then onwards, the highest placed of the three were invited. Colwyn Bay never subsequently qualified.

From the 2004–05 season, the competition was expanded to 16 clubs – the top 10 placed clubs from the Welsh Premier League, joined by the two best-placed of the three teams: Newport County, Merthyr Tydfil and Colwyn Bay, the Welsh Cup winners plus Cardiff City, Swansea City and Wrexham.

The competition offered a healthy prize fund. A share of the TV coverage money for live matches was also split between both clubs. The losing semi-final teams each received £25,000. The losing finalists received £50,000, with the winners receiving £100,000.

The competition's most senior clubs were accused of taking the competition lightly. Cardiff City in particular, following the arrival of ambitious owner Sam Hammam enjoyed relative success in the Football League but Cardiff City won the FAW Premier Cup just once, beating arch-rivals Swansea City in the 2002 final.

Wrexham appeared in all but three finals. The only Welsh Premier League clubs to have played in the final are Barry Town, Rhyl, The New Saints and Llanelli. The 2007 final was the first final not to include one of the English Football League clubs. In the last final, on 11 March 2008, Newport County beat Llanelli at Newport Stadium.

The FAW Premier Cup was broadcast on BBC Wales. However, after BBC Wales withdrew their sponsorship of the competition in 2008, the competition was cancelled.

In the 2011–12 season the FAW announced that the six exiled clubs would again be invited to play in the Welsh Cup. Merthyr Town, Newport County and Wrexham all accepted but Cardiff City, Colwyn Bay and Swansea City rejected the invitation. However, because UEFA refused to give any of these clubs entry into the Europa League by this route, these clubs did not enter the Welsh Cup in the following season.

== Results of finals ==
Year	Winners	Result	Runners-up	Venue	Attendance
1997–98	Wrexham	2–1	Cardiff City	Racecourse Ground	
1998–99	Barry Town	2–1	Wrexham	Racecourse Ground	
1999–2000	Wrexham	2–0	Cardiff City	Racecourse Ground	
2000–01	Wrexham	2–0	Swansea City	Vetch Field	
2001–02	Cardiff City	1–0	Swansea City	Ninian Park	6,629
2002–03	Wrexham	6–1	Newport County	Racecourse Ground	4,014
2003–04	Wrexham	4–1	Rhyl	Belle Vue	2,800
2004–05	Swansea City	2–1	Wrexham	Vetch Field	9,000
2005–06	Swansea City	2–1	Wrexham	Racecourse Ground	3,032
2006–07	The New Saints	1–0	Newport County	Newport Stadium	1,809
2007–08	Newport County	1–0	Llanelli	Newport Stadium	1,889

== Club-by-club record ==
Rank	Club	Appearances	Winners	Runners-up	Winning year(s)
1	Wrexham	11	5	3	1997–98, 1999–2000, 2000–01, 2002–03, 2003–04
2	Swansea City	11	2	2	2004–05, 2005–06
3	Cardiff City	11	1	2	2001–02
3	Newport County	7	1	2	2007–08
5	Barry Town	7	1	–	1998–99
5	The New Saints	9	1	–	2006–07
7	Rhyl	8	–	1	
7	Llanelli	3	–	1	

== See also ==
- Football in Wales
- Welsh football league system
- Welsh Cup
- Welsh League Cup
- List of football clubs in Wales
- List of stadiums in Wales by capacity
