= Haverfordwest County A.F.C. =

Association football club in Wales

Haverfordwest County
- Full name: Haverfordwest County Association Football Club
- Nickname: The Bluebirds
- Founded: 1899; 127 years ago (as Haverfordwest F.C.)
- Ground: Bridge Meadow Stadium; Haverfordwest
- Capacity: 2,100
- Chairman: Rob Edwards
- Manager: Antonio Corbisiero (interim)
- League: Cymru Premier
- 2025–26: Cymru Premier, 7th of 12
- Website: http://www.haverfordwestcountyafc.com/
Home colours	Away colours

Haverfordwest County Association Football Club (Welsh: Clwb Pêl-droed Hwlffordd) is a Welsh professional football team based in Haverfordwest, Wales. They currently play in the Cymru Premier.

The club was founded in 1899 and was variously known as Haverfordwest FC, Haverfordwest Town, and Haverfordwest Athletic before adopting the current name, and plays at the Ogi Bridge Meadow Stadium, Haverfordwest, which accommodates 2,100 spectators.

== History ==
Haverfordwest Football Club was formed in 1899 and was quickly renamed Haverfordwest Town in 1901. In 1936, the name of Haverfordwest Athletic was adopted and the first team switched to the Welsh Football League, leaving a reserve side in the Pembrokeshire League. In 1956 they gained promotion to the Welsh League Premier Division, having won the First Division title. The present name of Haverfordwest County was adopted and the club embarked on a long stay in the top flight. Disaster struck in 1975–76 when the club won only four league matches and was relegated to the First Division. Promotion eluded them until 1980 and they went on to take the championship in their first season back, losing only five games.

In 1983, the Welsh League was reorganised to create a form of "premiership" for the leading clubs and Haverfordwest's facilities, administration and playing record secured their admittance. In the nine years of existence of this National Division, Haverfordwest were out of the top six only once, but their way to the title was blocked by the powerful Barry Town side. Their opportunity to take the championship came in 1990, once Barry had decided to move to English non-league football.

Haverfordwest County were founder members of the League of Wales in 1992–93 but their stay was brief. Having accepted an offer which involved the redevelopment of their Bridge Meadow ground, and unable to find a suitable alternative ground of League of Wales standard, they resigned from the League in 1994. The decision to take a long-term view was fully vindicated by their return to the League of Wales three years later. The league has since changed its name to the Cymru Premier.

In 2004, Haverfordwest County qualified for Europe via league position in the League of Wales and played in the UEFA cup losing over two legs 4–1 to Fimleikafélag Hafnarfjarðar of Iceland.

In the 2010–11 season, Haverfordwest County were involuntarily relegated from the Welsh Premier League for the first time. On 5 May 2015, they were promoted back to the Welsh Premier League following an unlikely 5–0 victory against Aberdare Town. They were immediately relegated the following season.

The COVID-19 pandemic saw all domestic football in Wales ended before the end of the 2019–20 season. Haverfordwest County had finished in second place, a point behind Swansea University F.C. in the Cymru South, but achieved promotion to the Cymru Premier for the 2020–21 season due to Swansea University failing to obtain a Tier One license. On the 27th of May 2020, Rob Edwards became chairman of the club, and declared his ambition to see the club gain qualification for European Competition within three years. The 2020–21 season saw mixed fortunes for the club, recording a famous 2–1 home win over TNS, but narrowly missing out on a top 6 finish. There was also excitement when in March 2021, the club announced the signing of former Swansea City and Cardiff City player, and Wales international, Jazz Richards.

The 2021–22 season began with a poor run of form that saw manager Wayne Jones step down in December after a 4–1 away defeat to Flint Town United, with Jazz Richards and former club captain Sean Pemberton taking charge temporarily until a new manager was found. On 31 December, the club announced Belgian Nicky Hayen as their new manager and technical director, the first Belgian to manage in the Cymru Premier. Under Hayen, form improved significantly in the latter half of the season, recording three of the biggest victories in the clubs history, with two 6-1 wins over Cefn Druids and a 6–0 victory over Aberystwyth Town. The success under Hayen was short lived, however, with the Belgian leaving in June 2022 after an approach from Club Brugge to manage their U23's side, Club NXT.

In July 2022, former Swansea City and Hull City coach Tony Pennock was announced as Hayen's replacement. After a promising start to the 2022–23 season, a poor run of form due to a number of injuries to key players saw the team near the bottom of the Cymru Premier table, however a memorable 2–1 home win over high flying Connah's Quay in the final game of Phase One gave the team reason for optimism ahead of Phase Two. During Phase Two, an upturn in form saw an end of season seven game unbeaten run lead the team to finishing in a Europa Conference League play off spot. Haverfordwest met Cardiff Met at Cyncoed Campus in the play off semi final, a tight and cagey affair saw Haverfordwest as the eventual winners on penalties, with goalkeeper Zac Jones the hero, saving a penalty during regular time, and two in the shootout. The play off final against Newtown A.F.C saw the league's highest attendance for the season, with 1,826 fans there to witness another penalty shootout. Corey Shephard scored the winner for the second successive 4-3 penalty win for Haverfordwest, sending them into the first round of qualification for the Europa Conference League. It was the first time since 2004 the club had qualified for Europe, and only the second time in their history.

In June 2023 the club pulled off another impressive transfer coup, announcing the signing of former Chelsea and Fulham academy player, and England youth international Martell Taylor-Crossdale. July 2023 saw another major coup, when the club managed to secure the signing of Maltese international Luke Tabone for an undisclosed fee from Gżira United.

On April 17, 2026, Haverfordwest County announced an "exciting" hybrid first-team model, where some players would be selected to have full-time contracts whilst the rest would remain semi-pro.

== Rivalries ==
Haverfordwest County's main rivals are Carmarthen Town A.F.C. with the rivalry described as among the most hostile in Welsh League football. Known as 'The A40 Derby', which is the principal dual carriageway between the 2 towns, it is a match that always sticks out of the fixture list for the bluebirds. Haverfordwest County supporters often like to remind their neighbours about their 4–0 win away at Carmarthen on 8 December 2000, being Carmarthen's biggest home loss against any club since they were founded in 1950.

== Current squad ==
As of 4 September 2026

Note: Flags indicate national team as defined under FIFA eligibility rules; some limited exceptions apply. Players may hold more than one non-FIFA nationality.

No.	Pos.	Nation	Player
1	GK	WAL	Ifan Knott
2	DF	WAL	Dylan Rees (captain)
3	DF	WAL	Rhys Abbruzzese
4	MF	WAL	Kyle Kenniford
5	DF	WAL	Alaric Jones
6	DF	ENG	Jacob Bacon
7	MF	WAL	Ricky Watts
8	MF	WAL	Corey Shephard
9	FW	WAL	Lewis Rees
10	FW	WAL	Dan Hawkins
11	MF	ZIM	Panashe Makwiramiti
14	DF	WAL	Ben Phillips
15	MF	WAL	Jacob Owen (on loan from The New Saints)
16	MF	WAL	Cody Twose (on loan from Cardiff City)
17	DF	WAL	Kyle McCarthy

No.	Pos.	Nation	Player
18	MF	WAL	Greg Walters
19	DF	ENG	Jordan Hackett
20	FW	WAL	Owain Jones
22	FW	WAL	Jack Wilson
23	FW	WAL	Will Hughes
24	DF	WAL	Iori Humphreys
25	DF	SCO	Jack Walker
27	FW	WAL	Hari Thomas
28	FW	WAL	Ben Ah-Mun
29	MF	WAL	Clayton Green
30	GK	ENG	Lucas Myers
31	GK	WAL	Luc Rees
33	FW	WAL	Jayden Crawford
36	MF	WAL	Cai Lewis

=== Out on loan ===
Note: Flags indicate national team as defined under FIFA eligibility rules; some limited exceptions apply. Players may hold more than one non-FIFA nationality.

No.	Pos.	Nation	Player
21	MF	WAL	Ashley Watkins (on loan at Llanelli Town until 31 May 2027)

== Staff ==
Position	Name
Manager	(Wales) Tony Pennock
Assistant Manager	(Wales) Gary Richards
Goalkeeper Coach	(Wales) James Devonald
Sports Therapist	(England) Henry Fensome
Kitman	(Wales) Mickey Ellis
Club Doctor	(Wales) Richard Thompson
Chief Operating Officer	(Wales) Beccy Nuttall
Media Officer	(Wales) Tom Pritchard

== European Competitions ==
Season	Competition	Round	Club	1st Leg	2nd Leg	Agg.
2004–05	UEFA Cup	1QR	(Iceland) Fimleikafélag Hafnarfjarðar	0–1 (H) (Note: Match played at Ninian Park, Cardiff)	1–3 (A)	1–4
2023–24	UEFA Europa Conference League	1QR	(North Macedonia) Shkëndija	0–1 (A)	1–0 (a.e.t.) (H) (Note: Match played at Cardiff City Stadium, Cardiff)	1–1 (3–2 p)
2023–24	UEFA Europa Conference League	2QR	(Faroe Islands) B36 Tórshavn	1–2 (A)	1–1 (a.e.t.) (H)	2–3
2025–26	UEFA Conference League	1QR	(Malta) Floriana	1–2 (A)	2–3 (H)	3–5

== Managers ==
- 2026 – Present (England) Antonio Corbisiero (interim)
- 2022 – 2026 (Wales) Tony Pennock
- 2021 – 2022 (Belgium) Nicky Hayen
- 2021 (Wales) Sean Pemberton (Caretaker)
- 2018 – 2021 (Wales) Wayne Jones
- 2017 – 2018 (Wales) Sean Cresser
- 2013 – 2016 (Wales) Wayne Jones
- 2011 – 2013 (Wales) Mickey Ellis
- 2011 (Republic of Ireland) Derek Brazil
- 2010 – 2011 (Wales) Gavin Chesterfield
- 2006 – 2010 (Republic of Ireland) Derek Brazil
- 2002 – 2006 (Wales) Deryn Brace
- 2000 – 2002 (Wales) Jason Jones
- 1999 – 2000 (Wales) Mike Ellery
- 1994 – 1999 (Wales) Mark Hopkins
- 1992 – 1994 (Wales) Ray Davies

== Honours ==
- Cymru Premier / Welsh Premier League
  - Best ever finish 3rd in 2003–04, 2024–2025
- Welsh Cup
  - Best performance Semi-finalists in 2004–05
- FAW Premier Cup
  - Best performance Quarter-finalists in 2004–05
- Welsh League Division 1 / Premier Division / National Division (Step 1)
  - Winners 1956–57, 1980–81, 1989–90
  - Runners-up 1969–70, 1970–71, 2014–15, 2017–18
- Welsh League Division 1 (Step 2)
  - Winners 1979–80, 1996–97
  - Runners-up 1974–75, 1994–95, 1995–96
- Welsh League Division 2 West (Step 2)
  - Winners 1955–56
  - Runners-up 1954–55
- Welsh League Cup
  - Winners 1960–61, 1988–89
  - Runners-up 1974–75, 1984–85, 1996–97
- Welsh League (Youth Division) Cup
  - Winners 2005–06
  - Runners-up 2010–11
- West Wales Senior Cup
  - Winners 1981–82, 1988–89, 1991–92, 1992–93, 1997–98, 1998–99, 2005–06
  - Runners-up 1937–38, 1949–50, 1956–57, 1958–59, 1960–61, 1980–81

== Biggest victories ==
- Biggest Cymru Premier Home Win: 6–1 v Cefn Druids in 2022
- Biggest Cymru Premier Away Win: 0–6 v Aberystwyth Town FC in 2022
