= Carmarthen Town A.F.C. =

Association football club in Wales

Carmarthen Town
- Full name: Carmarthen Town Association Football Club
- Nicknames: Hen Aur; Old Gold
- Founded: 1950; 76 years ago
- Ground: Richmond Park, Carmarthen
- Capacity: 3,000 (1,000 seated)
- Coordinates: 51°51′35.8″N 4°18′08.1″W
- President: Einsley Harries
- Chairman: Anthony Parnell
- Manager: Rhodri Thomas
- League: Cymru South
- 2025–26: Cymru South, 5th of 16
- Website: carmarthentownafc.co.uk
Home colours	Away colours

Carmarthen Town Association Football Club (Welsh: Clwb Pêl-droed Tref Caerfyrddin) is a Welsh semi-professional football club based in Carmarthen. The team play their home games at Richmond Park. The club colours, reflected in their crest and kit, are gold and black.

Carmarthen Town was established in 1950, entering its first team into the Carmarthenshire League and a second team into the Carmarthen & District League. The club was elected into the Welsh Football League in 1953. Their first league honour came in 1959–60, with promotion from Division 2 West to the First Division of the Welsh League. Carmarthen Town's first trophy was the Welsh Football League Cup, which they won in the 1995–96 season. Since then the club have gone on to win the Welsh Cup once and the Welsh League Cup three times. They have also qualified for UEFA competitions on four occasions.

Carmarthen Town currently play in Cymru South and have never won a top-flight league title, despite having been in the top tier of Welsh football for 24 years until their relegation in the 2019–2020 season. The club had their highest finish in 2000–2001, with third place, which qualified them for European competition for the first time.

== Stadium ==
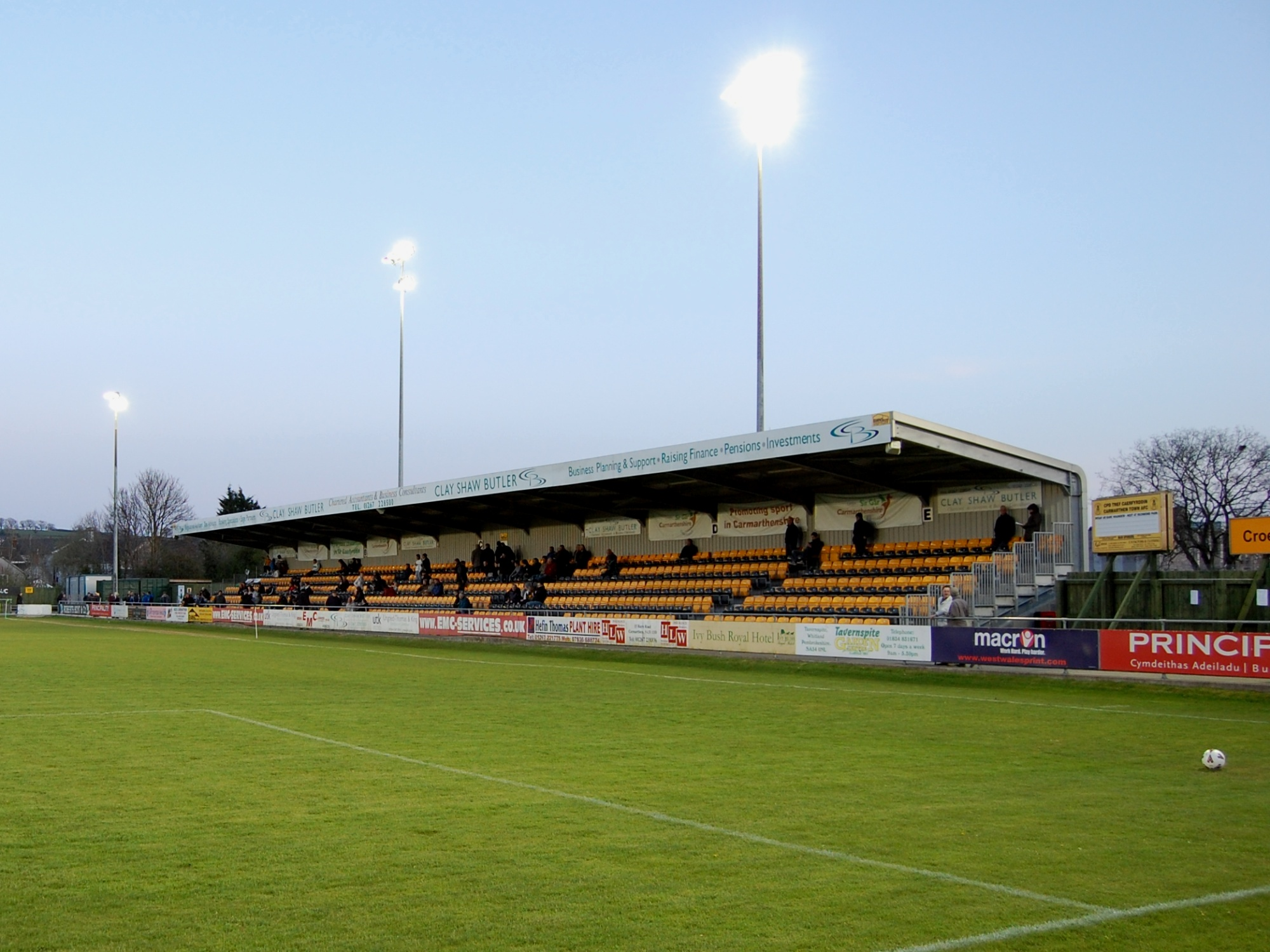
Clay Shaw Butler Stand, Richmond Park (Carmarthen),

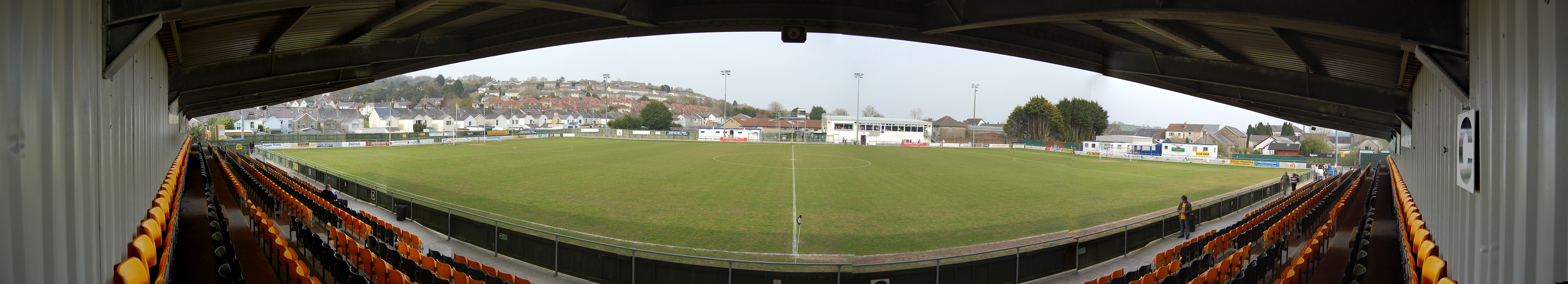
A panoramic view from the Clay Shaw Butler Stand.

From 1952 Carmarthen Town have played at Richmond Park in Carmarthen. The ground has been redeveloped over recent years into a small, modern and compact football stadium with a capacity of 3,000. The club's new Clay Shaw Butler Stand has a 1000-seat capacity which enabled Carmarthen Town to host the club's first home European fixture at the ground in July 2007 when they entertained Norwegian side SK Brann.

== Supporters ==
In the 2025–26 season Carmarthen's average attendance was 237, placing them sixth out of sixteen teams in the Cymru South. The highest league gate of the season came against Ammanford with 447 spectators and the lowest, 148, against Cwmbran Celtic.

== Current squad ==
As of 1 September 2026

Note: Flags indicate national team as defined under FIFA eligibility rules; some limited exceptions apply. Players may hold more than one non-FIFA nationality.

No.	Pos.	Nation	Player
1	GK	WAL	Lee Idzi
2	DF	WAL	Luke Cummings
3	DF	WAL	Sam Parsons
4	DF	WAL	Trystan Jones
5	MF	WAL	Tyler Aylward (captain)
6	DF	WAL	Rhys Jenkins
7	MF	WAL	Mason Thomas-Jones
8		WAL	Ryan Bond-Morgan
9	FW	WAL	Liam Thomas
10	FW	WAL	Lewis Reed

No.	Pos.	Nation	Player
11	MF	WAL	Ryan Bevan
14	MF	WAL	Kurtis Rees
16	MF	WAL	Jamie Rickard
17	MF	WAL	Osian James
19	FW	WAL	Dion Phillips
20	FW	WAL	Josh Joda
22		WAL	Llifon Evans
26	MF	WAL	Shane McKibbin
27	FW	WAL	Iestyn Thomas

== Management and staff ==
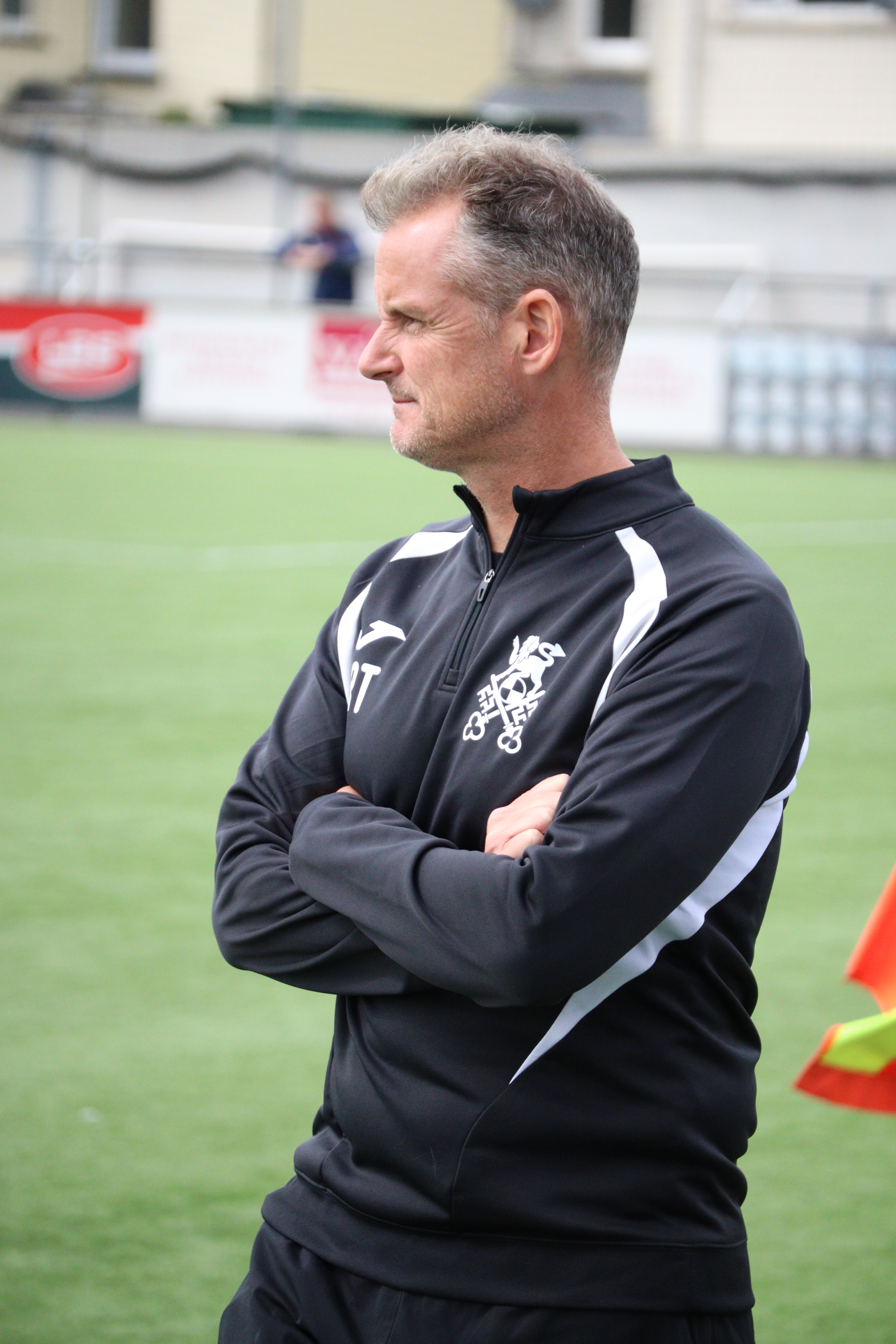
Having previously served as assistant manager, Rhodri Thomas was appointed Carmarthen Town manager ahead of the 2026–27 season.

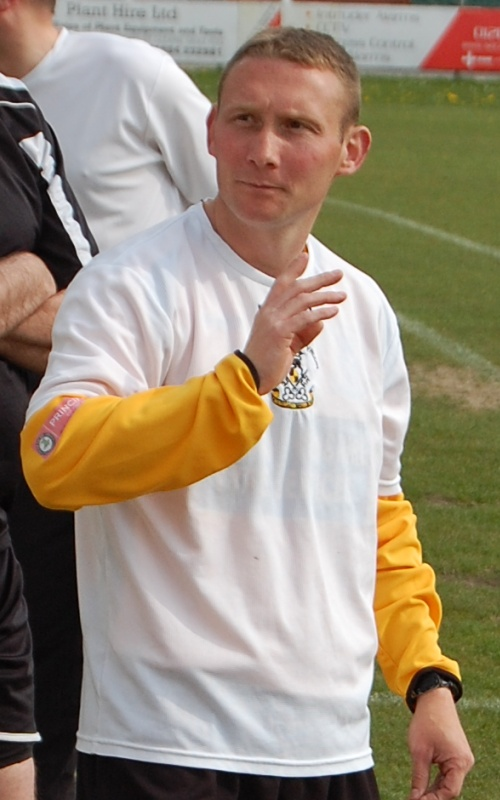
Deryn Brace, Player-Manager of Carmarthen Town between 2007 and 2010

=== Current staff ===
Management and coaching staff as of 22 August 2026
Position	Name
Manager	Rhodri Thomas
Coaches	Chris Thomas
Coaches	Stuart Lloyd
Kit manager	Mark Hannington
Sports therapist	Marek Bollin
Academy manager	Joel Beynon
Women's team manager	Carwyn Phillips
Club doctor	Dr Llinos Roberts

=== Directors and senior officials ===
Directors and senior club officials as of 22 August 2026
Position	Name
President	Einsley Harries
Patron	Elis James
Chair	Vacant
Director	Paul Evans
Director	Jonathan Lewis
Director	Anthony Parnell
Director	Paul Ashley-Jones
General manager and FAW contact	Paul Evans
Fixture secretary	Jake Ashley-Jones
Clubhouse manager	Roger Hunt
Finance manager	Anthony Parnell
Football operations manager	Keiran Davies
Communications manager	Steffan Roberts
Stadium manager	Jonathan Lewis

=== Managerial history ===
The following managers have each been in charge of Carmarthen Town since the club gained promotion to the highest tier in Welsh football, the Cymru Premier, in 1996.

As of 4 July 2026.

Name	Nationality	Period		Honours
Name	Nationality	From	To	Honours
Wyndham Evans	Wales	January 1996	October 1996	Welsh Football League Cup Winner
John Mahoney	Wales	October 1996	November 1998	
Tomi Morgan	Wales	November 1998	September 2003	Welsh Cup Runner-up, Highest League position: 3rd place 2000–01
Andrew York	Wales	September 2003	May 2004	Welsh League Cup Runner-up
Mark Jones	Wales	May 2004	May 2007	Welsh Cup Winner, Welsh Cup Runner-up, Welsh League Cup Winner
Deryn Brace	Wales	May 2007	June 2010	
Tomi Morgan	Wales	June 2010	December 2011	
Neil Smothers	Wales	December 2011	January 2012	
Mark Aizlewood	Wales	January 2012	February 2018	Welsh League Cup Winner (2): 2012–13, 2013–14
Neil Smothers (Interim Manager)	Wales	February 2018	May 2018	
Neil Smothers	Wales	May 2018	October 2019	
Danny Thomas (Caretaker Manager)	Wales	October 2019	November 2019	
Kristian O'Leary	Wales	November 2019	July 2021	
Sean Cresser	Wales	July 2021	April 2022	
Mark Aizlewood	Wales	April 2022	June 2026	
Rhodri Thomas	Wales	June 2026		

== Honours ==
As of 10 January 2014.

The Welsh Football League

- Welsh second tier (currently Welsh Football League Division One)
  - Winners (1): 1995–96
- Welsh third tier (currently Welsh Football League Division Two)
  - Winners (1): 1959–60

Domestic Cup Competition

- Welsh Cup:
  - Winners (1): 2006–07
  - Runners-up (2): 1998–99, 2004–05
- Cymru Premier Cup:
  - Winners (3): 2004–05, 2012–13, 2013–14
  - Runners-up (1): 2003–04
- Welsh Football League Cup
  - Winners (1): 1995–96
- West Wales Senior Cup:
  - Winners (1): 2004
  - Runners-up (2): 2003, 2006

European Competition

- UEFA Cup
  - Qualification:2005–06, 2007–08
- UEFA Intertoto Cup
  - Qualification: 2001–02, 2006–07

== Records and Statistics ==
=== Club records ===
Carmarthen Town's scores are given first in all scorelines.

==== Record wins ====
- Record league win: 9–1 against UWIC Inter Cardiff, 21 October 2000
- Record competitive win: 11–0 against Cardiff Corinthians, (Welsh Cup, Second Round), 1 October 2005
- Record league home win:

9–1 against UWIC Inter Cardiff, 21 October 2000
8–0 against Cardiff Grange Quins, 10 December 2005
8–0 against Connah's Quay Nomads, 8 December 2007

- Record league away win: 7–0 against Baglan Dragons, 28 March 2026

==== Record defeats ====
- Record league defeat: 0–8 against The New Saints, 29 March 2009
- Record league home defeat: 1–7 against Caersws, 10 October 2003
- Record league away defeat: 0–8 at The New Saints, 29 March 2009

==== Other scoring records ====
- Highest-scoring match: 10–3 against Llanelli Town, (League Cup, Preliminary Round - 2nd leg), 25 August 2004
- Highest-scoring draw:

5–5 against Briton Ferry Llansawel, (League Cup, First Round), 8 September 2015
5–5 against Penrhiwceiber Rangers, 12 April 2025

=== European record ===
- Record European win: 5–1 against Longford Town, 28 July 2005
- Record European defeat: 0–8 against SK Brann, 19 July 2007

Season	Competition	Round	Opponent	Home	Away	Aggregate	Refs
2001–02	UEFA Intertoto Cup	First round	(Sweden) AIK	0–0	0–3	0–3	
2005–06	UEFA Cup	First qualifying round	(Republic of Ireland) Longford Town	5–1	0–2	5–3	
2005–06	UEFA Cup	Second qualifying round	(Denmark) FC Copenhagen	0–2	0–2	0–4	
2006	UEFA Intertoto Cup	First round	(Finland) Tampere United	1–3	0–5	1–8	
2007–08	UEFA Cup	First qualifying round	(Norway) SK Brann	0–8	3–6	3–14	

=== Player records ===
As of 31 August 2026.

==== Most goals in season ====
28 by Noah Daley in 2024–25 (24 Cymru South, 4 Welsh Cup)
26 by Liam Thomas in 2018–19 (24 Welsh Premier, 2 Welsh Cup):

==== Most goals in match ====
5 by Mattie Davies against Llanelli Town, 25 August 2004 (League Cup)
5 by Tim Hicks against Connah's Quay Nomads, 8 December 2007 (Welsh Premier League)
5 by Luke Prosser against Briton Ferry Llansawel, 8 September 2015 (League Cup, First Round)
5 by Liam Thomas against Taffs Well, 21 February 2025 (Cymru South)

==== Club top scorer ====
208 by Liam Thomas

==== Most club appearances ====
400 by Liam Thomas

== See also ==
List of Carmarthen Town A.F.C. seasons
