= 2022–23 Cymru Premier =

Next season of the highest league in Welsh football

Cymru Premier Uwch Gynghrair Cymru
- Season: 2022–23
- Dates: 12 August 2022 – 22 April 2023
- Champions: The New Saints
- Relegated: Airbus UK Broughton; Flint Town United
- UEFA Champions League: The New Saints
- Europa Conference League: Connah's Quay Nomads; Penybont (via Welsh Cup); Haverfordwest County (via Play-offs)
- Matches: 192
- Goals: 590 (3.07 per match)
- Biggest home win: The New Saints 11–0 Aberystwyth Town; 2 December 2022)
- Biggest away win: Airbus UK Broughton 0–8 The New Saints; 31 December 2022)
- Highest scoring: The New Saints 11–0 Aberystwyth Town; 2 December 2022)
- Longest winning run: The New Saints (12 games)
- Longest unbeaten run: The New Saints (22 games)
- Longest winless run: Airbus UK Broughton (32 games)
- Longest losing run: Airbus UK Broughton (22 games)
- Highest attendance: 1,826 Newtown vs. Haverfordwest County (13th May 2023)
- Lowest attendance: 103 Cardiff Metropolitan University vs. Flint Town United (3 September 2022)
- Average attendance: 305 (data missing for six matches - excludes playoff matches)

The 2022–23 Cymru Premier (Welsh: Uwch Gynghrair Cymru 2022–23) (known as the JD Cymru Premier for sponsorship reasons) was the 31st season of the Cymru Premier (formerly known as the Welsh Premier League), the highest football league within Wales since its establishment in 1992.

The winners (The New Saints, their second consecutive league title win and fifteenth overall) qualified for the 2023–24 UEFA Champions League first qualifying round. The runners-up (Connah's Quay Nomads), third-placed team (Penybont), and Europa Conference League play-off winners (Haverfordwest County) qualified for the 2023–24 UEFA Europa Conference League first qualifying round. The bottom two teams (Airbus UK Broughton and Flint Town United) were relegated to the 2023–24 Cymru North.

== Teams ==
Twelve teams contested the league – the top ten teams from the previous season, and one team each promoted from the second tier leagues, the Cymru North and Cymru South. The New Saints entered the season as defending champions.

Airbus UK Broughton, winners of the 2021–22 Cymru North were promoted to the league. Due to 2021–22 Cymru South champions Llantwit Major's failure to achieve a tier one licence, runners-up Pontypridd Town were promoted in their place. In June 2022, Pontypridd Town changed their name to Pontypridd United.

The two bottom placed teams from the 2021–22 season, Cefn Druids and Barry Town United, were relegated to the Cymru North and the Cymru South respectively for the 2022–23 season.

=== To Cymru Premier ===
Promoted from the Cymru North

- Airbus UK Broughton

Promoted from the Cymru South

- Pontypridd Town

=== From Cymru Premier ===
Relegated to the Cymru North

- Cefn Druids

Relegated to the Cymru South

- Barry Town United

== Stadia and locations ==
Locations of the 2022–23 Cymru Premier teams

| Team | Location | Stadium | Capacity |
|---|---|---|---|
| Aberystwyth Town | Aberystwyth | Park Avenue | 5,000 |
| Airbus UK Broughton | Broughton | The Airfield | 1,600 |
| Bala Town | Bala | Maes Tegid | 3,000 |
| Caernarfon Town | Caernarfon | The Oval | 3,000 |
| Cardiff Metropolitan University | Cyncoed | Cyncoed Campus | 1,620 |
| Connah's Quay Nomads | Connah's Quay | Deeside Stadium | 1,500 |
| Flint Town United | Flint | Cae-y-Castell | 1,000 |
| Haverfordwest County | Haverfordwest | Bridge Meadow Stadium | 2,100 |
| Newtown | Newtown | Latham Park | 5,000 |
| Penybont | Bridgend | Bryntirion Park | 3,000 |
| Pontypridd United | Treforest | USW Sports Park | 1,000 |
| The New Saints | (England) Oswestry | Park Hall | 2,034 |

== Personnel and kits ==
| Team | Head coach | Captain | Kit manufacturer | Front shirt sponsor |
|---|---|---|---|---|
| Aberystwyth Town | (Wales) Anthony Williams | (England) Jack Thorn | Acerbis | Aberystwyth University |
| Airbus UK Broughton | (Wales) Jamie Reed | (England) Steve Tomassen | Umbro | Gardner Aerospace |
| Bala Town | (England) Colin Caton | (Wales) Chris Venables | Macron | Aykroyd's |
| Caernarfon Town | (Wales) Richard Davies | (Wales) Dion Donohue | Errea | Gofal Bro Cyf |
| Cardiff Metropolitan University | (Wales) Christian Edwards | (Wales) Chris Baker | Errea | Cardiff Metropolitan University |
| Connah's Quay Nomads | (Wales) Neil Gibson | (England) George Horan | Nike | Educate Group |
| Flint Town United | (Wales) Lee Fowler | (Wales) James Owen | Macron | Essity |
| Haverfordwest County | (Wales) Tony Pennock | (Wales) Dylan Rees | Joma | West Wales Properties |
| Newtown | (Wales) Chris Hughes | (Wales) Craig Williams | Errea | Control Techniques |
| Penybont | (Wales) Rhys Griffiths | (Wales) Kane Owen | Macron | Nathaniel Car Sales |
| Pontypridd United | (Wales) Andrew Stokes | (Wales) Clayton Green | Joma | UPVCDIRECT.CO.UK |
| The New Saints | (England) Craig Harrison | (England) Chris Marriott | Legea | SiFi Networks |

== Managerial changes ==
| Team | Outgoing manager | Manner of departure | Date of vacancy | Position in table | Incoming manager | Date of appointment |
|---|---|---|---|---|---|---|
| Pontypridd United | (Wales) Jonathan Jones | Resigned | 9 May 2022 | Pre-season | (Wales) Andrew Stokes | 16 May 2022 |
| Aberystwyth Town | (England) Antonio Corbisiero | Resigned | 12 May 2022 | Pre-season | (Wales) Anthony Williams | 28 May 2022 |
| Haverfordwest County | (Belgium) Nicky Hayen | Signed by (Belgium) Club NXT | 15 June 2022 | Pre-season | (Wales) Tony Pennock | 1 July 2022 |
| Flint Town United | (Wales) Neil Gibson | Resigned | 16 June 2022 | Pre-season | (Wales) Lee Fowler | 17 June 2022 |
| Cardiff Metropolitan University | (Wales) Christian Edwards | Resigned | 30 June 2022 | Pre-season | (Wales) Ryan Jenkins | 29 June 2022 |
| The New Saints | (Australia) Anthony Limbrick | Sacked | 28 July 2022 | Pre-season | (England) Craig Harrison | 4 August 2022 |
| Connah's Quay Nomads | (England) Craig Harrison | Signed by The New Saints | 4 August 2022 | Pre-season | (Wales) Neil Gibson | 4 August 2022 |
| Airbus UK Broughton | (Wales) Steve O'Shaughnessy | Sacked | 24 September 2022 | 12th | (Wales) Jamie Reed | 19 October 2022 |
| Cardiff Metropolitan University | (Wales) Ryan Jenkins | Resigned | 30 January 2023 | 4th | (Wales) Christian Edwards | 30 January 2023 |
| Caernarfon Town | (Wales) Huw Griffiths | Sacked | 18 March 2023 | 8th | (Wales) Richard Davies | 24 April 2023 |
| Airbus UK Broughton | (Wales) Jamie Reed | Sacked | 13 April 2023 | 12th | (England) Mark Allen | 21 April 2023 |

== League table ==
| Pos | Team | Pld | W | D | L | GF | GA | GD | Pts | Qualification or relegation (Note: Teams play each other twice (22 matches), before the league is split into two groups (the top six and the bottom six).) |
|---|---|---|---|---|---|---|---|---|---|---|
| 1 | The New Saints (C) | 32 | 26 | 5 | 1 | 112 | 17 | +95 | 83 | Qualification for the Champions League first qualifying round |
| 2 | Connah's Quay Nomads | 32 | 17 | 10 | 5 | 45 | 23 | +22 | 61 | Qualification for the Europa Conference League first qualifying round (Note: The 2022–23 Welsh Cup also qualified for the Europa Conference League first qualifying round. Since the cup winners, The New Saints, qualified based on league position, the Europa Conference League spot was passed to the third-placed team.) |
| 3 | Penybont | 32 | 16 | 10 | 6 | 51 | 32 | +19 | 52 (Note: Penybont were deducted six points for fielding ineligible players against Airbus UK Broughton on 3 January 2023 and Cardiff Metropolitan University on 17 February 2023.) | Qualification for the Europa Conference League first qualifying round |
| 4 | Cardiff Metropolitan University | 32 | 16 | 4 | 12 | 41 | 49 | −8 | 52 | Qualification for the Europa Conference League play-offs |
| 5 | Bala Town | 32 | 12 | 8 | 12 | 51 | 37 | +14 | 44 | Qualification for the Europa Conference League play-offs |
| 6 | Newtown | 32 | 12 | 5 | 15 | 49 | 56 | −7 | 41 | Qualification for the Europa Conference League play-offs |
| 7 | Haverfordwest County (O) | 32 | 14 | 5 | 13 | 49 | 44 | +5 | 47 | Qualification for the Europa Conference League play-offs |
| 8 | Pontypridd United | 32 | 12 | 5 | 15 | 41 | 52 | −11 | 41 | |
| 9 | Caernarfon Town | 32 | 12 | 3 | 17 | 51 | 54 | −3 | 39 | |
| 10 | Aberystwyth Town | 32 | 11 | 5 | 16 | 41 | 73 | −32 | 38 | |
| 11 | Flint Town United (R) | 32 | 9 | 8 | 15 | 41 | 53 | −12 | 35 | Relegation to Cymru North or Cymru South |
| 12 | Airbus UK Broughton (R) | 32 | 0 | 2 | 30 | 18 | 100 | −82 | −4 (Note: Airbus UK Broughton were deducted six points for fielding ineligible players against Caernarfon Town on 2 September 2022 and Pontypridd United on 11 February 2023.) | Relegation to Cymru North or Cymru South |

Source: Cymru Premier
Rules for classification: 1) Points; 2) Goal difference; 3) Head-to-head points; 4) Goals scored; 5) Matches won.
(C) Champions; (O) Play-off winners; (R) Relegated

== Results ==
=== Matches 1–22 ===
| Home \ Away | ABE | AIR | BAL | CAE | CMU | CQN | FTU | HAV | NTW | PYB | PON | TNS |
|---|---|---|---|---|---|---|---|---|---|---|---|---|
| Aberystwyth Town | — | 2–1 | 1–4 | 2–1 | 0–4 | 2–1 | 2–1 | 2–1 | 1–2 | 0–3 | 2–1 | 0–2 |
| Airbus UK Broughton | 1–2 | — | 0–6 | 0–3 | 0–2 | 1–2 | 1–3 | 1–2 | 4–4 | 0–3 | 0–4 | 0–8 |
| Bala Town | 3–0 | 2–1 | — | 3–0 | 2–0 | 0–0 | 1–0 | 1–1 | 3–0 | 1–1 | 3–0 | 0–5 |
| Caernarfon Town | 2–1 | 3–1 | 1–5 | — | 5–1 | 0–2 | 2–0 | 2–1 | 2–3 | 0–2 | 2–0 | 0–1 |
| Cardiff Metropolitan University | 2–1 | 3–1 | 1–0 | 0–3 | — | 2–0 | 1–0 | 2–0 | 2–1 | 0–0 | 3–0 | 0–7 |
| Connah's Quay Nomads | 3–0 | 1–0 | 1–0 | 3–3 | 2–0 | — | 2–0 | 1–0 | 3–1 | 2–0 | 1–0 | 1–1 |
| Flint Town United | 1–1 | 1–0 | 1–1 | 2–1 | 1–1 | 0–0 | — | 0–1 | 1–4 | 1–1 | 4–1 | 1–8 |
| Haverfordwest County | 3–1 | 3–0 | 1–4 | 1–0 | 1–0 | 2–1 | 1–1 | — | 2–3 | 2–1 | 1–1 | 1–3 |
| Newtown | 6–1 | 2–1 | 0–2 | 2–1 | 0–1 | 0–0 | 0–2 | 2–0 | — | 2–3 | 4–2 | 0–0 |
| Penybont | 3–1 | 2–0 | 2–0 | 5–1 | 1–3 | 0–1 | 2–1 | 3–2 | 3–0 | — | 1–1 | 0–0 |
| Pontypridd United | 2–1 | 1–0 | 2–1 | 3–1 | 0–1 | 0–5 | 0–1 | 3–2 | 1–4 | 0–1 | — | 0–2 |
| The New Saints | 11–0 | 7–0 | 3–0 | 3–0 | 4–0 | 2–1 | 6–2 | 3–1 | 4–1 | 1–0 | 2–0 | — |

Source: Cymru Premier
Legend: Blue = home team win; Yellow = draw; Red = away team win.

=== Matches 23–32 ===
==== Top six ====
| Home \ Away | BAL | CMU | CQN | NTW | PYB | TNS |
|---|---|---|---|---|---|---|
| Bala Town | — | 0–0 | 1–2 | 1–2 | 0–0 | 0–2 |
| Cardiff Metropolitan University | 2–1 | — | 0–2 | 0–0 | 2–3 | 3–2 |
| Connah's Quay Nomads | 1–1 | 2–1 | — | 2–0 | 0–0 | 0–0 |
| Newtown | 3–2 | 1–2 | 1–1 | — | 0–1 | 0–5 |
| Penybont | 2–2 | 2–1 | 1–1 | 2–1 | — | 2–5 |
| The New Saints | 2–1 | 7–1 | 4–1 | 1–0 | 1–1 | — |

Source: Cymru Premier
Legend: Blue = home team win; Yellow = draw; Red = away team win.

==== Bottom six ====
| Home \ Away | ABE | AIR | CAE | FTU | HAV | PON |
|---|---|---|---|---|---|---|
| Aberystwyth Town | — | 1–1 | 3–2 | 1–0 | 0–1 | 3–3 |
| Airbus UK Broughton | 1–7 | — | 0–2 | 1–3 | 1–4 | 0–3 |
| Caernarfon Town | 0–1 | 4–0 | — | 2–2 | 2–0 | 1–2 |
| Flint Town United | 5–0 | 2–1 | 2–3 | — | 0–2 | 0–0 |
| Haverfordwest County | 1–1 | 4–0 | 2–2 | 3–1 | — | 2–0 |
| Pontypridd United | 1–1 | 4–0 | 1–0 | 3–2 | 2–1 | — |

Source: Cymru Premier
Legend: Blue = home team win; Yellow = draw; Red = away team win.

== Europa Conference League play-offs ==
Teams placed 3rd-7th enter one-off play-off matches for the third spot in the Europa Conference League first qualifying round. One of the spots is vacated if the Welsh Cup winners finish 7th or higher, with the 3rd-placed team qualifying automatically if the Welsh Cup winners finish in the top two. The higher-placed team gains home advantage.

Bala Town, Cardiff Metropolitan University, Haverfordwest County, Newtown, and Penybont qualified for the play-offs. Since the 2022–23 Welsh Cup winners, The New Saints, qualified for the Champions League first qualifying round based on league position, Penybont's play-off spot was vacated and they directly qualified for the Europa Conference League as the 3rd-placed team.

=== Semi-finals ===
| 5 May 2023 | Bala Town | 2–4 | Newtown | Maes Tegid |
| 19:45 BST (UTC+01) | Newell 37', 73' | Report | Williams 17', 53'; Ismail 42', 82' | Referee: Mark Petch |

| 6 May 2023 | Cardiff Metropolitan University | 0–0 (a.e.t.) (3–4 p) | Haverfordwest County | Cyncoed Campus Stadium |
| 17:15 BST (UTC+01) | | Report | | Attendance: 561; Referee: Thomas Owen |
| | Penalties |
| | McCarthy (penalty missed); Rees (penalty missed); Craven (penalty scored); Jones (penalty scored); Veale (penalty scored) | | (penalty scored) Rees; (penalty scored) Leahy; (penalty scored) Davies; (penalty missed) Jones; (penalty scored) Dugan |

=== Final ===
| 13 May 2023 | Newtown | 1–1 (a.e.t.) (3–4 p) | Haverfordwest County | Latham Park |
| 17:15 BST (UTC+01) | A. Williams 38' | | Davies 24' | Attendance: 1,826; Referee: Bryn Markham-Jones |
| | Penalties |
| | A. Williams (penalty missed); C. Williams (penalty scored); Roberts (penalty scored); Cowans (penalty missed); Aris (penalty scored) | | (penalty scored) Rees; (penalty scored) Leahy; (penalty scored) Davies; (penalty missed) Fawcett; (penalty scored) Shephard |

== Season statistics ==
As of 13 April 2023

=== Top scorers ===
| Rank | Player | Club | Goals |
|---|---|---|---|
| 1 | (Scotland) Declan McManus | The New Saints | 26 |
| 2 | (England) Aaron Williams | Newtown | 14 |
| 2 | (Northern Ireland) Ryan Brobbel | The New Saints | 14 |
| 4 | (England) Ben Clark | The New Saints | 13 |
| 5 | (Wales) Ben Ahmun | Pontypridd United | 12 |
| 5 | (Wales) Jordan Davies | Haverfordwest County | 12 |

==== Hat-tricks ====
| Player | For | Against | Result | Date |
|---|---|---|---|---|
| (Wales) Sam Jones | Cardiff Metropolitan University | Aberystwyth Town | 0–4 (A) | 20 August 2022 |
| (Poland) Adrian Cieślewicz | The New Saints | Cardiff Metropolitan University | 0–7 (A) | 17 September 2022 |
| (England) George Newell | Bala Town | Airbus UK Broughton | 0–6 (A) | 30 September 2022 |
| (Wales) Ben Ahmun | Pontypridd United | Airbus UK Broughton | 0–4 (A) | 29 October 2022 |
| (England) Louis Robles | Newtown | Pontypridd United | 4–2 (H) | 16 December 2022 |
| (England) Ben Clark | The New Saints | Airbus UK Broughton | 7–0 (H) | 26 December 2022 |
| (Northern Ireland) Ryan Brobbel | The New Saints | Airbus UK Broughton | 0–8 (A) | 31 December 2022 |
| (Scotland) Declan McManus | The New Saints | Flint Town United | 1–8 (A) | 10 January 2023 |
| (England) Zack Clarke | Flint Town United | Pontypridd United | 4–1 (H) | 21 January 2023 |
| (Wales) Ben Ahmun | Pontypridd United | Airbus UK Broughton | 4–0 (H) | 11 February 2023 |
| (Wales) Lloyd Marsh-Hughes | Caernarfon Town | Airbus UK Broughton | 4–0 (A) | 31 March 2023 |
| (Scotland) Declan McManus | The New Saints | Newtown | 5–0 (A) | 1 April 2023 |

Notes

(H) – Home team
(A) – Away team

=== Attendances ===
| Team | Highest | Lowest | Average |
|---|---|---|---|
| Aberystwyth Town | 1120 | 187 | 378 |
| Airbus UK Broughton | 374 | 147 | 232 |
| Bala Town | 505 | 179 | 236* |
| Caernarfon Town | 674 | 232 | 485 |
| Cardiff Metropolitan University | 401 | 103 | 192 |
| Connah's Quay Nomads | 436 | 166 | 262 |
| Flint Town United | 1050 | 172 | 339 |
| Haverfordwest County | 560 | 277 | 364* |
| Newtown | 514 | 171 | 297 |
| Penybont | 506 | 206 | 296* |
| Pontypridd United | 437 | 153 | 288 |
| The New Saints | 425 | 201 | 289* |

Figures taken from FAW Cymru Football app and other club channels. Correct as of 24 April 2023. Excludes Europa Conference League playoff fixtures. *Denotes incomplete record, as missing attendance figures. Figures for Bala v TNS (14/4), Haverfordwest v Airbus (18/3), TNS v CQN (22/4) and Penybont v Cardiff Met (17/2), CQN (18/3) and Newtown (22/4) have not been publicly recorded.

=== Monthly awards ===
| Month | Manager of the Month | | Player of the Month | |
| Month | Manager | Club | Player | Club |
|---|---|---|---|---|
| August | Ryan Jenkins | Cardiff Metropolitan University | Sam Jones | Cardiff Metropolitan University |
| September | Colin Caton | Bala Town | David Edwards | Bala Town |
| October | Neil Gibson | Connah's Quay Nomads | Andy Firth | Connah's Quay Nomads |
| November | Tony Pennock | Haverfordwest County | Zeli Ismail | Newtown |
| December | Chris Hughes | Newtown | Ryan Sears | Newtown |
| January | Rhys Griffiths | Penybont | Kostya Georgievsky | Penybont |
| February | Andrew Stokes | Pontypridd United | Mark Cadwallader | Aberystwyth Town |
| March | Andrew Stokes | Pontypridd United | George Ratcliffe | Pontypridd United |
| April | Tony Pennock | Haverfordwest County | Niall Flint | Aberystwyth Town |
