= 2011 Welsh Cup final =

2011 Football Association of Wales Challenge Cup final
- Event: 2010–11 Welsh Cup
Bangor City	Llanelli
1	4
- Date: 8 May 2011
- Venue: Parc y Scarlets, Llanelli
- Man of the Match: Rhys Griffiths
- Referee: Mark Petch (Deganwy)
- Attendance: 1,719

The 2011 Welsh Cup final was the final of the 125th season of the main domestic football cup competition in Wales, the Welsh Cup. The final was played at Parc y Scarlets in Llanelli on 8 May 2011 and marked the third time the final has been staged at the stadium. The match was contested by Bangor City, who beat Gap Connah's Quay 1–0 in their semi-final, and Llanelli who beat The New Saints 1–0 in their semi-final.

Welsh Premier League side Llanelli were looking for their first Welsh Cup win having contested in two previous finals, appearing previously in 2008 losing 1–0 to this year's opponents. While it is Bangor City's 15th appearance in the final, who were looking to make history as the first North Wales club to win four consecutive Welsh Cups.

== Pre-match ==
=== Officials ===
Deganwy-based referee Mark Petch was named as the referee for the 2011 Welsh Cup Final on 12 April 2011. Petch had previously officiated in two Under-19 Internationals and to Welsh Cup semi finals.

His assistants for the 2011 final were Gareth Ayres of Port Talbot, Phil Thomas of Porth, with Bryn Markham-Jones of Wrexham as the fourth official.

=== Kits ===
Both teams wore their home kits.

== Match ==
=== Details ===
8 May 2011
15:00 BST (UTC+01)
2011 Welsh Cup Final

Bangor City	1 – 4	Llanelli
Alan Bull 51'	Report	Rhys Griffiths 15', 60'; Craig Moses 20'; Chris Venables 64'

Parc y Scarlets, Llanelli
Attendance: 1,719
Referee: Mark Petch (Deganwy)

Bangor City	Llanelli

BANGOR CITY:
GK	1	(Wales) Paul Smith
DF	2	(England) Peter Hoy	(yellow card) 70'
DF	3	(Wales) Chris Roberts	(yellow card) 66'
DF	4	(England) Dave Morley	(yellow card) 71'
DF	5	(Wales) Darren Moss (c)
MF	6	(Wales) Clive Williams		(substituted off) 62'
FW	7	(Wales) Nicky Ward
MF	11	(Wales) Chris Jones		(substituted off) 75'
FW	16	(Wales) Les Davies
S	17	(England) Alan Bull		(substituted off) 75'
DF	8	(Wales) Michael Johnston
Substitutes:
MF	12	(England) Mark Smyth	(yellow card) 77'	(substituted on) 62'
MF	15	(England) Eddie Jebb		(substituted on) 75'
MF	9	(Wales) Sion Edwards		(substituted on) 75'
FW		(England) Michael Jukes
GK		(Republic of Ireland) Chris Oldfield
Manager:
(Wales) Neville Powell

LLANELLI:
GK	1	(Wales) Ashley Morris
DF	2	(Wales) Kris Thomas
DF	3	(Wales) Chris Venables
DF	4	(Wales) Stuart Jones
DF	5	(Wales) Wyn Thomas
MF	6	(Wales) Jason Bowen	(substituted off) 74'
MF	7	(England) Antonio Corbisiero
FW	9	(Wales) Rhys Griffiths
MF	16	(Wales) Chris Holloway
S	17	(Wales) Craig Moses
DF	8	(Wales) Ashley Evans
Substitutes:
MF	12	(Wales) Jordan Follows	(substituted on) 74'
MF	15	(Wales) Andy Legg
GK	13	(Wales) Craig Richards
FW		(Wales) Adam Orme
DF		(Wales) Martyn Giles
Manager:
(Wales) Andy Legg

MATCH OFFICIALS

- Assistant referees:
  - Gareth Ayres (Port Talbot)
  - Phil Thomas (Porth)
- Fourth official: Bryn Markham-Jones (Wrexham)

MATCH RULES

- 90 minutes.
- 30 minutes of extra-time if necessary.
- Penalty shoot-out if scores still level.
- Five named substitutes.
- Maximum of three substitutions.

== See also ==
- 2010–11 Welsh Cup
- 2011 Welsh League Cup Final
