= Gary Richards =

Gary Richards may refer to:

- Gary Richards (footballer) (born 1963), former Welsh footballer
- Gary Richards (music executive) (born 1970), American music executive, concert promoter and DJ

== See also ==
- Gary Richard (born 1965), American football player
- Garry Richards (born 1986), English footballer
