= 2021–22 Cymru Premier =

Cymru Premier Uwch Gynghrair Cymru
- Season: 2021–22
- Dates: 13 August 2021 - 14 May 2022
- Champions: The New Saints
- Relegated: Cefn Druids; Barry Town United
- Champions League: The New Saints
- Europa Conference League: Bala Town; Newtown
- Matches: 192
- Goals: 562 (2.93 per match)
- Top goalscorer: Declan McManus (21 goals)
- Biggest home win: Bala Town 11-0 Penybont; 24 April 2022)
- Biggest away win: Aberystwyth Town 0–6 Haverfordwest County (15 March 2022)
- Highest scoring: Bala Town 11-0 Penybont; 24 April 2022)
- Longest winning run: The New Saints (8 games)
- Longest unbeaten run: The New Saints (14 games)
- Longest winless run: Cefn Druids (25 games)
- Longest losing run: Cefn Druids (7 games)
- Highest attendance: 1,248 - Barry Town vs Connah's Quay Nomads (11 September 2021)
- Lowest attendance: 65 - Cardiff Met vs Cefn Druids (2 October 2021)
- Average attendance: 335
- All statistics correct as of 15 May.

The 2021–22 Cymru Premier (Welsh: Uwch Gynghrair Cymru 2021–22) (known as the JD Cymru Premier for sponsorship reasons) was the 30th season of the Cymru Premier (formerly known as the Welsh Premier League), the highest football league within Wales since its establishment in 1992. Connah's Quay Nomads were the defending champions. Teams played each other twice on a home and away basis, before the league split into two groups after phase 1 matches were completed. Due to Wales losing a European place, the format of the play-offs changed, with the prize now being a place in the Scottish Challenge Cup.

== Teams ==
Twelve teams competed in the league – the same twelve teams as the previous season. Due to the COVID-19 pandemic, the Cymru North and Cymru South leagues were unable to be played the previous season, therefore no teams were able to be promoted. As every team already in the premier league had been granted a Tier 1 license, there was no need for any team to be relegated.

=== Stadia and locations ===
Locations of the 2021–22 Cymru Premier teams

Team	Location	Stadium	Capacity
Aberystwyth Town	Aberystwyth	Park Avenue	5,000
Bala Town	Bala	Maes Tegid	3,000
Barry Town United	Barry	Jenner Park Stadium	3,500
Caernarfon Town	Caernarfon	The Oval	3,000
Cardiff Metropolitan University	Cyncoed	Cyncoed Campus	1,620
Cefn Druids	Rhosymedre	The Rock	3,000
Connah's Quay Nomads	Connah's Quay	Deeside Stadium	1,500
Flint Town United	Flint	Cae-y-Castell	1,000
Haverfordwest County	Haverfordwest	Bridge Meadow Stadium	2,100
Newtown	Newtown	Latham Park	5,000
Penybont	Bridgend	Bryntirion Park	3,000
The New Saints	(England) Oswestry	Park Hall	2,034

=== Personnel and kits ===
Team	Head coach	Captain	Kit manufacturer	Front shirt sponsor
Aberystwyth Town	(England) Antonio Corbisiero	(England) Jack Thorn	Acerbis	Aberystwyth University
Bala Town	(England) Colin Caton	(Wales) Chris Venables	Macron	Aykroyd's
Barry Town United	(Wales) Gavin Chesterfield	(Wales) Kayne McLaggon	Macron	RIM Motors
Caernarfon Town	(Wales) Huw Griffiths	(Wales) Dion Donohue	Errea	Gofal Bro Cyf
Cardiff Metropolitan University	(Wales) Christian Edwards	(Wales) Chris Baker	Errea	Cardiff Metropolitan University
Cefn Druids	(Republic of Ireland) Andy Turner	(England) Michael Jones	Errea	Wrexham Lager
Connah's Quay Nomads	(England) Craig Harrison	(England) George Horan	Nike	Educate Group
Flint Town United	(Wales) Neil Gibson	(Wales) Alex Jones	Macron	Essity
Haverfordwest County	(Belgium) Nicky Hayen	(Wales) Dylan Rees	Joma	West Wales Properties
Newtown	(Wales) Chris Hughes	(Wales) Craig T. Williams	Errea	Control Techniques
Penybont	(Wales) Rhys Griffiths	(Wales) Kane Owen	Macron	Nathaniel House of Cars
The New Saints	(Australia) Anthony Limbrick	(England) Chris Marriott	Legea	SiFi Networks

=== Managerial changes ===
Team	Outgoing manager	Manner of departure	Date of vacancy	Position in table	Incoming manager	Date of appointment
Cefn Druids	(Wales) Jayson Starkey	End of caretaker spell	27 May 2021	Pre-season	(Wales) Niall McGuinness	27 May 2021
Aberystwyth Town	(Wales) Gavin Allen	Resigned	2 June 2021	Pre-season	(England) Antonio Corbisiero	2 June 2021
Cefn Druids	(Wales) Niall McGuinness	Resigned	24 September 2021	12th	(Republic of Ireland) Andy Turner (caretaker)	24 September 2021
Connah's Quay Nomads	(Scotland) Andy Morrison	Resigned	28 September 2021	6th	(England) Craig Harrison	29 September 2021
Haverfordwest County	(Wales) Wayne Jones	Resigned	5 December 2021	10th	(Belgium) Nicky Hayen	31 December 2021

== League table ==
Pos	Team	Pld	W	D	L	GF	GA	GD	Pts	Qualification (Note: Teams play each other twice (22 matches), before the league is split into two groups (the top six and the bottom six).)
1	The New Saints (C)	32	25	5	2	86	26	+60	80	Qualification for the Champions League first qualifying round
2	Bala Town	32	16	11	5	67	37	+30	59	Qualification for the Europa Conference League first qualifying round
3	Newtown	32	15	6	11	50	35	+15	51	Qualification for the Europa Conference League first qualifying round
4	Caernarfon Town (O)	32	13	4	15	46	53	−7	43	Qualification to Scottish Challenge Cup play-offs
5	Flint Town United	32	12	6	14	51	53	−2	42	Qualification to Scottish Challenge Cup play-offs
6	Penybont	32	10	10	12	49	57	−8	40	Qualification to Scottish Challenge Cup play-offs
7	Cardiff Metropolitan University	32	10	12	10	35	38	−3	42	Qualification to Scottish Challenge Cup play-offs
8	Aberystwyth Town	32	11	7	14	38	45	−7	40	
9	Connah's Quay Nomads	32	15	11	6	44	18	+26	38 (Note: Connah's Quay Nomads were deducted 18 points for fielding an ineligible player in six matches.)	
10	Haverfordwest County	32	10	8	14	45	46	−1	38	
11	Barry Town United (R)	32	8	7	17	31	47	−16	31	Relegation to Cymru North or Cymru South
12	Cefn Druids (R)	32	2	3	27	22	109	−87	9	Relegation to Cymru North or Cymru South

Source: Cymru Premier table
Rules for classification: 1) Points; 2) Goal difference; 3) Head-to-head points; 4) Goals scored; 5) Matches won.
(C) Champions; (O) Play-off winners; (R) Relegated

== Results ==
13 August 2021 – 26 February 2022

=== Matches 1–22 ===
Home \ Away	ABE	BAL	BAR	CAE	CMU	CDR	CQN	FTU	HAV	NTW	PYB	TNS
Aberystwyth Town	—	0–1	2–1	0–1	0–1	5–0	0–1	1–2	2–0	2–4	0–3	1–0
Bala Town	2–2	—	3–3	3–0	0–0	1–1	0–4	3–1	6–2	1–0	2–2	1–4
Barry Town United	1–1	0–0	—	1–2	0–1	1–0	1–0	0–1	3–2	0–3	0–0	1–2
Caernarfon Town	3–3	3–3	1–2	—	2–0	3–0	0–1	2–3	2–0	0–2	1–2	0–4
Cardiff Metropolitan University	0–1	0–0	2–0	0–1	—	4–2	1–1	1–5	0–2	1–1	3–2	1–1
Cefn Druids	0–1	3–5	1–4	1–3	1–3	—	0–2	1–1	0–2	0–5	0–3	1–4
Connah's Quay Nomads	1–0	0–1	2–3	1–1	0–0	4–0	—	2–0	1–0	0–2	0–0	0–1
Flint Town United	1–0	1–2	3–2	3–4	2–2	4–0	1–1	—	4–1	4–1	3–1	1–1
Haverfordwest County	0–0	0–0	1–1	1–2	0–0	2–1	1–1	2–0	—	1–0	2–2	0–1
Newtown	1–2	3–3	2–1	1–0	0–0	5–0	0–2	2–0	1–1	—	3–1	1–4
Penybont	4–0	1–0	4–0	1–1	2–1	7–1	1–1	1–1	2–1	1–1	—	1–1
The New Saints	3–0	2–1	3–1	5–3	5–0	5–1	3–1	1–0	6–0	2–0	3–2	—

Source: Cymru Premier
Legend: Blue = home team win; Yellow = draw; Red = away team win.

=== Matches 23–32 ===
==== Top six ====
Home \ Away	BAL	CAE	FTU	NTW	PYB	TNS
Bala Town	—	2–0	3–2	1–0	11–0	1–1
Caernarfon Town	0–2	—	2–1	0–4	1–0	0–3
Flint Town United	0–1	0–4	—	1–1	1–0	1–2
Newtown	0–2	1–0	2–1	—	1–2	0–2
Penybont	0–5	0–3	0–3	0–2	—	1–2
The New Saints	2–1	3–1	7–0	0–1	3–3	—

Source: Cymru Premier
Legend: Blue = home team win; Yellow = draw; Red = away team win.

==== Bottom six ====
Home \ Away	ABE	BAR	CMU	CDR	CQN	HAV
Aberystwyth Town	—	2–1	0–2	6–0	1–1	0–6
Barry Town United	0–1	—	1–0	1–0	1–1	0–1
Cardiff Metropolitan University	1–1	1–1	—	5–0	0–0	3–2
Cefn Druids	3–3	1–0	2–0	—	0–3	1–6
Connah's Quay Nomads	1–0	2–0	2–0	5–0	—	3–0
Haverfordwest County	0–1	2–0	1–2	6–1	0–0	—

Source: Cymru Premier
Legend: Blue = home team win; Yellow = draw; Red = away team win.

== Scottish Challenge Cup play-offs ==
=== Semi-finals ===
7 May 2022	Flint Town United	1–1 (3–1 p)	Penybont	The Essity Stadium
14:30 BST (UTC+01)

7 May 2022	Caernarfon Town	1–0	Cardiff Metropolitan University	The Oval, Caernarfon
17:15 BST (UTC+01)

=== Final ===
14 May 2022	Caernarfon Town	2–1 (a.e.t.)	Flint Town United	The Oval, Caernarfon
14:00 BST (UTC+01)

== Season statistics ==
=== Top scorers ===
Rank	Player	Club	Goals
1	(Scotland) Declan McManus	The New Saints	24
2	(England) Aaron Williams	Newtown	17
3	(England) Jordan Williams	The New Saints	15
4	(England) Michael Wilde	Flint Town United	14
4	(Wales) Kayne McLaggon	Barry Town United	14

==== Hat-tricks ====
Player	For	Against	Result	Date
(England) Michael Wilde	Flint Town United	Cefn Druids	4–0 (H)	21 August 2021
(England) Aaron Williams	Newtown	Barry Town United	0–3 (A)	2 October 2021
(Scotland) Declan McManus	The New Saints	Haverfordwest	6–0 (H)	6 November 2021
(Wales) Nicky Rushton	Newtown	Aberystwyth	2–4 (A)	10 December 2021
(Wales) Ben Ahmun	Penybont	Aberystwyth	4–0 (H)	21 January 2022
(Brazil) Mello	Connah's Quay	Cefn Druids	5–0 (H)	15 March 2022
(Spain) Alhagi Touray Sisay	Haverfordwest	Aberystwyth	0–6 (A)	15 March 2022
(Wales) Will Evans	Bala	Penybont	0–5 (A)	2 April 2022
(Wales) Jazz Richards	Haverfordwest	Cefn Druids	1–6 (A)	9 April 2022
(England) Jordan Williams	The New Saints	Flint Town	7–0 (H)	15 April 2022

Notes

(H) – Home team
(A) – Away team

=== Monthly awards ===
Month	Manager of the Month		Player of the Month	
Month	Manager	Club	Player	Club
August	Anthony Limbrick	The New Saints	Clayton Green	Barry Town
September	Colin Caton	Bala Town	David Edwards	Bala Town
October	Chris Hughes	Newtown	Kayne McLaggon	Barry Town
November	Antonio Corbisiero	Aberystwyth Town	John Owen	Aberystwyth Town
December	Chris Hughes	Newtown	Jordan Williams	The New Saints
January	Anthony Limbrick	The New Saints	Harry Franklin	Aberystwyth Town
February	Craig Harrison	Connah's Quay	Mike Hayes	Caernarfon Town
March	Nicky Hayen	Haverfordwest County	Chris Venables	Bala Town

=== Annual awards ===
Award	Winner	Club
Manager of the Season	(Australia) Anthony Limbrick	The New Saints
Player of the Season	(Scotland) Declan McManus	The New Saints
Young Player of the Season	(Wales) Mael Davies	Penybont
Goal of the Season	(Wales) Kyle McCarthy	Cardiff Met University

Team of the Season
Goalkeeper	(England) Oliver Byrne (Connah's Quay Nomads)				
Defenders	(Wales) Mael Davies (Penybont)	(Wales) Danny Davies (The New Saints)	(Wales) Nathan Peate (Bala Town)	(Wales) Dion Donohue (Caernarfon)	(Wales) Kane Owen (Penybont)
Midfielders	(England) Daniel Redmond (The New Saints)			(England) Ryan Brobbel (The New Saints)	
Forwards	(England) Lifumpa Mwandwe (Newtown)		(Scotland) Declan McManus (The New Saints)		(Wales) Will Evans (Bala Town)

=== Fair Play award ===
The winner for each respective division's FAW Fair Play Table was to be given £1,000 prize money and the FAW Fair Play Trophy.

The winners of the Nationwide Building Society Fair Play Award for the 2021-2022 Cymru Premier season are Connah's Quay Nomads
