= Corbisiero =

Corbisiero is an Italian surname. Notable people with the surname include:

- Alex Corbisiero (born 1988), American-born English rugby union player
- Antonio Corbisiero (born 1984), English footballer and manager
