= Jack Garner (footballer) =

Welsh footballer (1871–1948)

Personal information
- Full name: John Garner
- Date of birth: 11 January 1871
- Place of birth: Aberystwyth, Wales
- Date of death: 23 September 1948 (aged 77)
- Place of death: Ludlow, England
- Position: Forward

Senior career*
Years	Team	Apps	(Gls)
1893–1898	Aberystwyth Town		

International career
1896	Wales	1	(0)
- * Club domestic league appearances and goals

John Garner (11 January 1871 – 23 September 1948) was a Welsh footballer who played as a forward.

== Football career ==
Garner began playing football while at the Ardwyn Grammar School in Aberystwyth. He was later a founder-member of Aberystwyth Town, and began playing for the club by 1893, where he was also the club's captain. He remained captain of the club until 1896, when he was succeeded by William Roberts Jones, and continued playing until at least 1898.

In March 1896, Garner was called up to the Wales national team for their 1895–96 British Home Championship match against Scotland, which Scotland won 4–0.

In September 1896, Garner was appointed as an official referee by the Football Association of Wales. Following his retirement, he joined the Aberystwyth Town Football Committee, which he remained part of as late as 1908.

== Outside of football ==
In 1900, Garner ran as a Conservative in the 1900 Aberystwyth municipal election. He was appointed a magistrate in 1917, before later becoming a senior magistrate. He later worked as the Presiding Justice of the Aberystwyth Juvenile Court until his retirement in 1947.

== Death ==
While visiting his daughter in Ludlow, England, Garner died after suffering a seizure on 23 September 1948, at the age of 77.

== See also ==
- List of Wales international footballers (alphabetical)
