= Conall Murtagh =

Northern Irish footballer (born 1985)

Personal information
- Full name: Conall Francis Murtagh
- Date of birth: 29 June 1985 (age 41)
- Place of birth: Belfast, Northern Ireland
- Position: Midfielder

Team information
- Current team: Liverpool (head of physical performance coach)

Youth career
- 2001–2003: Ballymena United

Senior career*
Years	Team	Apps	(Gls)
2003	Crusaders	12	(0)
2003–2005	Heart of Midlothian	0	(0)
2005	→ Raith Rovers (loan)	11	(1)
2005–2006	Connah's Quay Nomads	27	(3)
2006–2007	Rhyl	25	(1)
2007	Southport	0	(0)
2007–2009	Wrexham	4	(0)
2008	→ Droylsden (loan)	6	(0)
2009–2010	The New Saints	20	(2)
2010	→ Aberystwyth Town (loan)	13	(3)
2010–2011	Aberystwyth Town	20	(1)
2011–2018	Bala Town	152	(8)
Total		290	(19)

International career
2005	Northern Ireland U21	1	(0)
- * Club domestic league appearances and goals as of 13:06, 1 February 2018 (UTC)

Conall Francis Murtagh (born 29 June 1985) is a Northern Irish sports scientist and professional football coach who is head of physical performance coach for Premier League club Liverpool. A former footballer, he made over seventy appearances in the Scottish League, Football League and Football Conference, as well as making 226 appearances in the Welsh Premier League, primarily for Bala Town. He played in European competitions for five seasons, representing Bala Town in Europe in three seasons 2012–13, 2014–15 and 2015–16, Rhyl in 2010 and the Champions League with TNS.

He also represented Northern Ireland at all age groups to under-21 level and captained the side.

== Playing career ==
Murtagh started his senior career in the Irish League with Ballymena United and Crusaders before joining Scottish League club Hearts on a two-year contract in 2003. He made no appearances for Hearts and joined Raith Rovers on loan in January 2005, where he made eleven first-team appearances in the remainder of the 2004–05 season in the Scottish First Division.

Murtagh was released by Hearts at the end of the 2004–05 season, commenced a degree at University of Manchester and joined League of Wales club Connah's Quay Nomads, where he made 27 league appearances, scoring three goals, in the 2005–06 season. He joined Rhyl in 2006, making 25 Welsh Premier league appearances, scoring once, in the 2006–07 season and collected a Welsh League Cup runners-up medal after a penalty defeat to Caersws in March 2007.

Murtagh joined Conference North club Southport in May 2007 but quickly left to join League Two side Wrexham in June 2007. He made six league and cup appearances for Wrexham in the 2007–08 season while completing his final year at University of Manchester, and a further six appearances for Football Conference side Droylsden, who he joined on a two-month loan in January 2008.

In January 2009, Murtagh signed for Welsh Premier League side The New Saints and in January 2010, he joined Aberystwyth Town on loan for the remainder of the 2009–10 season, scoring three times in thirteen appearances before being recalled in April. At the end of the season, Murtagh's contract ended at The New Saints and he joined Aberystwyth Town on a permanent basis.

In July 2011, he moved to Bala Town and helped the side achieve 5th place in the 2011–12 season playing a record number of games and making a clean sweep of end of season awards. In 2012–13, Bala were play-off champions and qualified for the first time in the club's history for a European position in the 2013–14 campaign. Bala qualified again for the Europa League in the ensuing seasons, 2014–15, 2015–16, 2016–17. Murtagh was Club Captain of Bala Town from 2014 to 2018.

He has represented his country, Northern Ireland, 38 times at international level at all underage groups under-15, under-16, under-17, under-19 and is also an under-21 International. He captained the Northern Ireland youth teams a number of times.

== Coaching career ==
Murtagh is a UEFA A and B Licence qualified coach and is completing the UEFA Pro Licence in 2023/24.

He holds a degree in physiology from the University of Manchester and has a master of science in sports science with physiology from the University of Chester. He completed his PhD in sports science at Liverpool John Moores University in March 2017.

Murtagh publishes widely on medical sports science issues and has been a keynote speaker to many soccer events, including the High Performance Football Coaching Course at Faculdade de Motricidade Humana, Lisboa, Portugal, in 2022 and 2023. He was a keynote speaker representing Liverpool and Liverpool John Moores University at the São Paulo Sports Science Congress hosted by Brazil's Palmeiras club, and was also a speaker at the 20th Annual Congress of the European College of Sport Science in Malmo, Sweden. Murtagh is also an honorary visiting research fellow at the School of Sport and Exercise Sciences in Liverpool John Moores University (appointed April, 2018).

He is head of the First Team Physical Performance department at Liverpool F.C. Conall was formerly first team sports science fitness coach at Liverpool and was previously fitness coach of the Liverpool Academy under-18 squad. Murtagh became an accredited member of the United Kingdom Strength and Conditioning Association in 2013 (UKSCA 2013).

== Honours ==
- Welsh Premier League Team of the Year: 2006–07

Award University of Manchester for services to professional football at Wrexham FC while qualifying in physiology (List of University of Manchester People)
