= FAW Welsh Youth Cup =

Association football competition in Wales

The FAW Welsh Youth Cup is a competition contested by teams affiliated to the Football Association of Wales at under-18 level. The competition is recorded as early as the late 1940s.

== Previous finals ==
Year	Winners	Score	Runners up	Notes	Venue
1947				Cardiff Nomads vs Wrexham Victoria, result unknown
1948	Connah's Quay Juniors	1–0	Cardiff Nomads
1949	Barry Island YPA		Queensferry Wanderers		Llanidloes
1959	Wrexham	4–2	Llanidloes Town		Welshpool
1960	Wrexham	2–1	Newtown	replay, first game 2–2 at Welshpool
1962	Wrexham	1–0	Cardiff City		Aberystwyth
1963	Wrexham	1–0	Swansea Town		Builth Wells
1964	Swansea Town	2–1	Wrexham		Aberystwyth
1965	Flint Town United	3–2
1971	Cardiff City	3–2	Wrexham	AET	Knighton
1975	Wrexham	3–0	Swansea City		Newtown
1976	Newport County	3–1	Wrexham		Llanidloes
1978	Wrexham	2–1	Afan Lido		Aberystwyth
1980	Cardiff City	2–1	Wrexham		Rhayader
1981	Wrexham	6–1	Afan Lido		Llanidloes
1985	Wrexham	3–1	Cogan St. Patricks	replay, first game 2–2 AET at Rhayader	Rhayader
1986	Cardiff City
1987	Cardiff City	3–0	Wrexham		Rhayader
1988	Cardiff City
1989	Cardiff City	2–1	Wrexham		Rhayader
1990	Cardiff City	5–0	Swansea City		Merthyr Tydfil
1991	Wrexham	1–0	Swansea City		Newport
1992	Wrexham	2–1	Cardiff City		Rhayader
1993	Hereford United	4–2	Wrexham		Knighton
1994	Wrexham	4–1	Swansea City		Llanidloes
1995	Cardiff City	1–0	Wrexham		Aberystwyth
1996	Wrexham	3–2	Swansea City	AET	Cardiff
1997	Pontardawe Athletic	1–0	Wrexham		Brecon
1998	Cardiff City	5–0	Llanelli		Afan Lido (Port Talbot)
1999	Swansea City	3–0	Caernarfon Youth Club		Newtown
2000	Cardiff City	2–0	Llanelli		Cardiff
2001	Cardiff City	3–1	Taff's Well	AET	Cardiff
2002	Cardiff City	3–2	Llanelli		Cardiff
2003	Swansea City	4–1	Llanelli		Llanelli
2004	Cardiff City	4–1	Swansea City		Cardiff
2005	Newport County	2–2	Cardiff City	Newport win 3–2 on pens	Cardiff
2006	Cardiff City	5–2	Aberystwyth Town		Port Talbot
2007	Merthyr Tydfil	2–1	Cardiff College Celts		Port Talbot
2008	Swansea City	1–0	Cardiff City		Cardiff
2009	Llanelli	2–1	Swansea City		Llanelli
2010	Swansea City	2–1	Wrexham		Swansea
2011	Swansea City	5–0	West End		Llanelli
2012	Swansea City	2–1	The New Saints		Swansea
2013	Swansea City	7–4	West End		Swansea
2014	Swansea City	6–1	The New Saints		Swansea
2015	Swansea City	3–1	Cardiff City		Cardiff
2016	Swansea City	5–0	Connah's Quay Nomads		Newtown
2017	Swansea City	2–0	Cambrian & Clydach	AET	Cardiff
2018	Swansea City	2–1	Cardiff City	Swansea win 3–2 on pens	Swansea
2019	Swansea City	2–1	The New Saints		Aberystwyth
2022	The New Saints	1–0	Flint Town United		Airbus UK Broughton
2023	The New Saints	5–2	Penybont		Aberystwyth
2024	Briton Ferry Llansawel	6–2	Barry Town United		Newtown
2025	Haverfordwest County	2–1	Caernarfon Town		Aberystwyth
2026	Caernarfon Town	3–2	The New Saints		Maesdu Park

== Winners table ==
- Including finalists since 1990

Rank	Team	Winners	Runners-up
1st	Swansea City	1999, 2003, 2008, 2010, 2011, 2012, 2013, 2014, 2015, 2016, 2017, 2018, 2019	1990, 1991, 1994, 1996, 2004, 2009
2nd	Cardiff City	1990, 1995, 1998, 2000, 2001, 2002, 2004, 2006	1992, 2005, 2008, 2015, 2018
3rd	Wrexham	1991, 1992, 1994, 1996	1993, 1995, 1997, 2010
4th	The New Saints	2022, 2023	2012, 2014, 2019, 2026
5th	Llanelli	2009	1998, 2000, 2002, 2003
6th	Briton Ferry Llansawel	2024	
=	Caernarfon Town/Caernarfon Youth Club	2026	1999, 2025
=	Haverfordwest County	2025	
=	Hereford United	1993	
=	Newport County	2005	
=	Merthyr Tydfil	2007	
=	Pontardawe Athletic	1997	
7th	West End		2011, 2013
8th	Aberystwyth Town		2006
=	Barry Town United		2024
=	Cambrian & Clydach		2017
=	Cardiff College Celts		2007
=	Connah's Quay Nomads		2016
=	Flint Town United		2022
=	Taff's Well		2001
