= Bari Morgan =

Welsh footballer and manager

Personal information
- Full name: David Bari Rees Morgan
- Date of birth: 13 August 1980 (age 46)
- Place of birth: Carmarthen, Wales
- Position: Midfielder

Youth career
- 1997–1999: Swansea City

Senior career*
Years	Team	Apps	(Gls)
1999–2001	Swansea City	5	(0)
2001–2014	Aberystwyth Town	309	(15)
2014–2015	Caersws	6	(0)

Managerial career
- 2017–2020: Aberystwyth Town (U19s Manager)
- 2021–2022: Aberystwyth Town (assistant)
- 2024–2025: Aberystwyth Town (assistant)
- * Club domestic league appearances and goals as of 02:12, 15 December 2014 (UTC)

David Bari Rees Morgan (born 13 August 1980) is a Welsh football coach and former footballer.

His uncle, Alan, is a former professional footballer and was formally his manager at Aberystwyth Town.

== Early life ==
As a child, Morgan attended Ysgol Gyfun Aberaeron.

== Career ==
Morgan began his career with Swansea City as a trainee. He signed his first professional contract with the club prior to the 1999–2000 season in July 1999 and made his first team debut on 11 January 2000 during a 2–0 defeat to Exeter City in the second round of the Football League Trophy. The following season, Morgan made five appearances for Swansea in all competitions but left the club at the end of the year, having initially been offered an extended contract. He instead joined Welsh Premier League side Aberystwyth Town where, over a nine-year period, he has gone on to make over 250 appearances in all competitions, including being named the club's player of the year for the 2003–04 season and captaining the team during their defeat to Latvian side Dinaburg FC in the 2004 UEFA Intertoto Cup.

== Personal life ==
Morgan, a fluent Welsh speaker, lives in Plwmp and also works as an assistant accountant for a computer company based in the nearby village of Llanon.
