= William Roberts Jones =

Welsh footballer

Personal information
- Date of birth: 1870
- Place of birth: Wales
- Date of death: 1938 (aged 67–68)

Senior career*
Years	Team	Apps	(Gls)
- Aberystwyth

International career
1897	Wales	1	(0)
- * Club domestic league appearances and goals

William Roberts Jones (1870 – 1938) was a Welsh international footballer. He was part of the Wales national football team, playing 1 match on 20 March 1897 against Scotland. At the club level, he played for Aberystwyth.

== See also ==
- List of Wales international footballers (alphabetical)
