= Swansea City A.F.C. Under-23s =

Coordinates: 51.648695°N 3.931675°W

Swansea City Under-23s
- Full name: Swansea City Association Football Club Under-21s
- Nickname: The Swans
- Founded: 1912; 114 years ago (as Swansea Town Reserves)
- Ground: Joma High Performance Centre, Swansea, Wales
- Capacity: 500
- Coach: Anthony Wright
- League: Professional Development League
- 2025-26: Professional Development League 4th of 20

Swansea City Association Football Club Under-23s is the most senior team of Swansea City's youth teams. It is the successor to the reserve team, which was formed in 1912 as Swansea Town Reserves. The Under-23s now compete in the Professional Development League. They play the majority of their home fixtures at the club's youth Academy in Landore, otherwise known as the Joma High Performance Centre, with fixtures occasionally taking place at the Swansea.com Stadium.

The Under-23 team is effectively Swansea City's second-string side, but is limited to three outfield players and one goalkeeper over the age of 23 per game following the introduction of new regulations from the 2016–17 season.

Head of coaching for the academy is Liam McGarry.

Anthony Wright is in charge of the Under-23s, with Mason McClelland responsible for the Under-18s.

== Under-23s ==
=== Current squad ===
As of 27 October 2026. Players listed in bold have made an appearance for the first team in a competitive fixture.

Note: Flags indicate national team as defined under FIFA eligibility rules; some limited exceptions apply. Players may hold more than one non-FIFA nationality.

No.	Pos.	Nation	Player
39	GK	WAL	Evan Watts
44	MF	WAL	**Thomas Woodward**
—	GK	IRL	Joe Collins
—	DF	ENG	**Arthur Parker**
—	DF	WAL	Seb Dabrowski
—	DF	ENG	Staitham Bowen
—	DF	ENG	Gregory Asemokhai
—	DF	ENG	Jack Fanning
—	DF	WAL	Caio Ifans
—	MF	WAL	**Ben Lloyd**

No.	Pos.	Nation	Player
—	MF	WAL	Callum Jones
—	MF	WAL	Milo Robinson
—	MF	WAL	Billy Clarke
—	MF	WAL	Yori Griffith
—	MF	WAL	Ramon Rees-Siso
—	MF	WAL	Thomas Searle
—	MF	WAL	Jacob Cook
—	FW	WAL	Harlan Perry
—	FW	TTO	Josiah Kallicharan
—	FW	WAL	Joe Davies

==== Out on loan ====
Note: Flags indicate national team as defined under FIFA eligibility rules; some limited exceptions apply. Players may hold more than one non-FIFA nationality.

No.	Pos.	Nation	Player
—	FW	ENG	Josh Pescatore (at Buxton until 30 June 2027)
—	DF	SCO	Blair McKenzie (at Waterford until 31 December 2026)
—	MF	WAL	Daniel Watts (at Exeter City until 30 June 2027)

No.	Pos.	Nation	Player
—	FW	WAL	Morgan Bates (at Inverness CT until 30 June 2027)
—	MF	WAL	Jacob Cook (at Hemel Hempstead until January 2027)
—	DF	WAL	Iestyn Jones (at Briton Ferry Llansawel)

=== Honours ===
Professional Development League 1 Division 2

- Winners:
  - 2016–17

Professional Development League 2

- Winners:
  - 2014–15

Premier League Cup

- Winners:
  - 2016–17

=== Timeline ===
- 1912: A team is formed to play in the Welsh Football League.
- 1919: A second reserve team is added to the Western League First Division.
- 1921: The Western League team is elected into the Southern League Welsh Section.
- 1923: The Southern League Welsh Section is renamed the Western Section.
- 1925: The reserves leave the Southern League.
- 1926: But a second team is restored following election to the London Combination.
- 1930: The London Combination is split into two leagues; the Swans were placed in Division 1.
- 1933: A single division London Combination is restored.
- 1946: Following the War the Combination is renamed the Football Combination and split into two leagues; the Swans were placed in Section B.
- 1948: The team is moved into Section A.
- 1952: Section A & B are renamed Division 1 and 2, with the Swans placed in the former.
- 1955: A single division Football Combination is restored.
- 1958: Reverted to two divisions; the Swans were placed in Division 1.
- 1960: The Swans are relegated for the first time in the Combination to Division 2.
- 1961: Left the Combination after a Saturday and Midweek Section were introduced.
- 1964: The top-flight of the Welsh League is renamed the Premier Division.
- 1966: The two division system was restored in 1963 and the Swans were back in Division 2 three years later.
- 1968: A single division Football Combination is restored.
- 1974: The team withdrew from the Combination after the season had started.
- 1983: But they were back nine years later to play in a single division league.
- 1986: The team decided not to enter a team after the 1985–86 campaign ended.
- 1992: Returned to play in Division 2.
- 1996: A single division Football Combination is restored.
- 1997: The team decided not to enter a team after the 1996–97 campaign ended.
- 1999: Returned to play in a five-team Second Division – consisting of Cardiff, Exeter, Plymouth & Torquay.
- 2000: The first-team won promotion to Division 2 and the reserve team was withdrawn.
- 2003: The regional Wales & West Division was formed and this is where the Swans competed from 2003 up until and including the 2010–11 season.
- 2011: Club competed in the Premier Reserve League for the first time. They were placed in the Southern Section.
- 2012: Reserve team replaced by an 'Under-21 team' and competed in the inaugural season of the Professional Development League. They were placed in the Professional Development League 2 South.
- 2015: Under-21s win the Professional Development League 2 with a 3–2 victory over Huddersfield Town Under-21s.
- 2015: Announced that the club will play Professional Development League 1 fixtures at both U21 and U18 level from 2015 to 2016.
- 2017: Under-23s win the Professional Development League 1 Division 2 and the Premier League Cup.
- 2020: Academy is downgraded to Category Two status, due to financial difficulties. Thus the under-23s were removed from Premier League 2 Division 2.
- 2026: Club submit application to upgrade academy back to Category One status. Will be audited during 2026/27 season.

=== League history ===
Prior to the 2012–13 season, Swansea City's second-string side were a reserve team who had mainly appeared in the Welsh Football League and the English Football Combination. The Reserves also had some short stints in the Western League (1919–21) and the Southern League (1921–25). Following Swansea City's promotion to the Premier League in 2011, Swansea's reserve team were invited to play in the 2011-12 Premier Reserve League. They finished 7th in what would turn out to be their last season as a 'reserve team'.

The historical venue for Swansea City's reserve matches was the Vetch Field. Following the Vetch Field's closure at the end of the 2004–05 season, Swansea City's second string have played at numerous temporary homes. This has included St. Helen's Rugby and Cricket Ground (2005–06), Port Talbot Town F.C.'s Victoria Road (Port Talbot) (2006–09, 2010–11), The Gnoll in Neath (2009–10), Parc y Scarlets in Llanelli (2011–12). Swansea City's home venue for their first season as an Under-21 team was Llanelli A.F.C.'s Stebonheath Park.

Season	Combination	Welsh League	Southern League	Western League	Premier Reserve League	Professional Development League
1912–13		**1 / 12** Division 1)				
1913–14		**2 / 10** (Division 1)				
1914–15		**5 / 9** (Division 1)				
1915–1919		**World War 1**				
1919–20		**4 / 16** (Division 1)		**2 / 10** (Division 1)		
1920–21		**3 / 22** (Division 1)		**4 / 16** (Division 1)		
1921–22		**10 / 21** (Division 1)	**6 / 9** (Welsh Section)			
1922–23		**2 / 21** (Division 1)	**3 / 11** (Welsh Section)			
1923–24		**2 / 16** (Division 1)	**6 / 18** (Western Division)			
1924–25		**1 / 17** (Division 1)	**1 / 20** (Western Division)			
1925–26		**1 / 15** (Division 1)				
1926–27	**7 / 22** (London Combination)	**2 / 13** (Division 1)				
1927–28	**14 / 22** (London Combination)	**5 / 13** (Division 1)				
1928–29	**16 / 22** (London Combination)	**4 / 11** (Division 1)				
1929–30	**5 / 22** (London Combination)	**3 / 11** (Division 1)				
1930–31	**16 / 22** (London Combination Div 1)	**4 / 11** (Division 1)				
1931–32	**20 / 22** (London Combination Div 1)	**3 / 11** (Division 1)				
1932–33	**5 / 24** (London Combination Div 1)	**2 / 12** (Division 1)				
1933–34	**16 / 24** (London Combination)	**1 / 13** (Division 1)				
1934–35	**13 / 24** (London Combination)	**1 / 13** (Division 1)				
1935–36	**6 / 24** (London Combination)	**1 / 17** (Division 1)				
1936–37	**20 / 24** (London Combination)	**3 / 17** (Division 1)				
1937–38	**18 / 24** (London Combination)	**3 / 17** (Division 1)				
1938–39	**15 / 24** (London Combination)	**6 / 17** (Division 1)				
1939–1945		**World War 2**				
1945–46	**No competition**	**7 / 19** (Division 1)				
1946–47	**8 / 16** (Section B)	**14 / 20** (Division 1)				
1947–48	**11 / 16** (Section B)	**14 / 20** (Division 1)				
1948–49	**3 / 16** (Section A)	**11 / 19** (Division 1)				
1949–50	**5 / 16** (Section A)	**9 / 20** (Division 1)				
1950–51	**3 / 16** (Section A)	**11 / 20** (Division 1)				
1951–52	**11 / 16** (Section A)	**13 / 19** (Division 1)				
1952–53	**5 / 16** (Division 2)	**3 / 20** (Division 1)				
1953–54	**9 / 16** (Division 2)	**8 / 20** (Division 1)				
1954–55	**1 / 16** (Division 2)	**11 / 20** (Division 1)				
1955–56	**23 / 32** (Combination)	**10 / 20** (Division 1)				
1956–57	**30 / 32** (Combination)	**12 / 20** (Division 1)				
1957–58	**18 / 32** (Combination)	**6 / 20** (Division 1)				
1958–59	**14 / 18** (Division 1)	**3 / 19** (Division 1)				
1959–60	**16 / 18** (Division 1)	**5 / 20** (Division 1)				
1960–61	**1 / 20** (Division 2)	**7 / 20** (Division 1)				
1961–62	**Did not enter**	**1 / 20** (Division 1)				
1962–63	**Did not enter**	**1 / 20** (Division 1)				
1963–64	**Did not enter**	**1 / 18** (Division 1)				
1964–65	**Did not enter**	**1 / 16** (Premier Division)				
1965–66	**Did not enter**	**3 / 16** (Premier Division)				
1966–67	**13 / 13** (Division 2)	**4 / 16** (Premier Division)				
1967–68	**5 / 11** (Division 2)	**4 / 18** (Premier Division)				
1968–69	**21 / 26** (Combination)	**8 / 18** (Premier Division)				
1969–70	**11 / 26** (Combination)	**5 / 18** (Premier Division)				
1970–71	**3 / 22** (Combination)	**11 / 18** (Premier Division)				
1971–72	**15 / 21** (Combination)	**12 / 18** (Premier Division)				
1972–73	**18 / 21** (Combination)	**11 / 18** (Premier Division)				
1973–74	**20 / 22** (Combination)	**12 / 18** (Premier Division)				
1974–75	**Withdrew after starting**	**11 / 18** (Premier Division)				
1975–76	**Did not enter**	**1 / 18** (Premier Division)				
1976–77	**Did not enter**	**8 / 18** (Premier Division)				
1977–78	**Did not enter**	**10 / 18** (Premier Division)				
1978–79	**Did not enter**	**6 / 18** (Premier Division)				
1979–80	**Did not enter**	**5 / 18** (Premier Division)				
1980–81	**Did not enter**	**7 / 18** (Premier Division)				
1981–82	**Did not enter**					
1982–83	**Did not enter**					
1983–84	**16 / 22** (Combination)					
1984–85	**14 / 22** (Combination)					
1985–86	**22 / 22** (Combination)					
1986–87	**Did not enter**					
1987–88	**Did not enter**					
1988–89	**Did not enter**					
1989–90	**Did not enter**					
1990–91	**Did not enter**					
1991–92	**Did not enter**					
1992–93	**2 / 10** (Division 2)					
1993–94	**3 / 10** (Division 2)					
1994–95	**1 / 11** (Division 2)					
1995–96	**2 / 9** (Division 2)					
1996–97	**13 / 23** (Combination)					
1997–98	**Did not enter**					
1998–99	**Did not enter**					
1999–2000	**4 / 5** (Division 2)					
2000–01	**Did not enter**					
2001–02	**Did not enter**					
2002–03	**Did not enter**					
2003–04	**7 / 10** (Wales & West Division)					
2004–05	**8 / 9** (Wales & West Division)					
2005–06	**9 / 9** (Wales & West Division)					
2006–07	**9 / 10** (Wales & West Division)					
2007–08	**6 / 10** (Wales & West Division)					
2008–09	**6 / 10** (Wales & West Division)					
2009–10	**2 / 10** (Wales & West Division)					
2010–11	**2 / 7** (Wales & West Division					
2011–12					**7 / 8** (South)	
2012–13						**8 / 11** (League 2 South)
2013–14						**8 / 10** (League 2 South)
2014–15						**2 / 10** (League 2 South)
2015–16						**3 / 12** (U21 Premier League Division 2)
2016–17						**1 / 12** (Premier League 2 Division 2)
2017–18						**4 / 12** (Premier League 2 Division 1)
2018–19						**12 / 12** (Premier League 2 Division 1)
2019–20						**8 / 12** (Premier League 2 Division 2)
2020–21						**7 / 9** (Professional Development League)
2021–22						**8 / 9** (Professional Development League)
2022–23						**3 / 10** (Professional Development League)
2023–24						**2 / 10** (Professional Development League)
2024–25						**7 / 11** (Professional Development League)
2025–26						**4 / 20** (Professional Development League)

== Academy ==
Swansea City Academy is the youth development system of EFL Championship team Swansea City. It fields an under-18s team in the South Division of the Professional Development League 2 and the FA Youth Cup. Until the 2018/2019 season, the academy also fielded an under-19s team in the FAW Welsh Youth Cup.

The team train and play matches at the club's youth Academy in Landore, otherwise known as the Joma High Performance Centre.

=== Current squad ===
As of August 2026. Note: Flags indicate national team as defined under FIFA eligibility rules; some limited exceptions apply. Players may hold more than one non-FIFA nationality.

No.	Pos.	Nation	Player
50	DF	WAL	Carter Heywood
—	GK	POL	Jakub Nowak
—	GK	WAL	Thomas Wright
—	DF	NIR	Jack May
—	DF	WAL	Kaven Bloniarczyk

No.	Pos.	Nation	Player
—	MF	WAL	Bobo Evans
—	MF	WAL	Alfie Jones
—	MF	WAL	Kai Rhodes
—	MF	WAL	Elis Thomas
—	FW	WAL	Harvey Gray

=== Honours ===
FAW Welsh Youth Cup

- Winners: 12 Times
  - 1999, 2003, 2008, 2010, 2011, 2012, 2013, 2014, 2015, 2016, 2017, 2018, 2019
- Runners-up: 6 Times
  - 1990, 1991, 1994, 1996, 2004, 2009

== Graduates ==
The following players have all progressed through the youth academy at Swansea City and have either made at least one appearance for the first team in professional competition, have gone on to play professionally or have represented their national team. Players in bold are still contracted to the club.

=== 2020s ===
	Player	DOB	Position	Professional Debut	Appearances	Goals	Current club
(Wales)	**Thomas Woodward**	9 December 2006	Midfielder / Attacker	2 May 2026 (EFL Championship with Swansea City)	Ongoing	Ongoing	Swansea City
(England)	**Arthur Parker**	3 May 2006	Defender	12 August 2025 (EFL Cup with Swansea City)	Ongoing	Ongoing	Swansea City
(Wales)	Evan Watts	23 September 2004	Goalkeeper	7 March 2025 (League of Ireland Premier Division with Galway United)	Ongoing	Ongoing	Swansea City
(England)	Kyrell Wilson	1 December 2004	Midfielder	11 November 2023 (EFL Championship with Swansea City)	3	0	KAA Gent
(Wales)	**Ben Lloyd**	14 March 2005	Midfielder	26 December 2024 (EFL Championship with Swansea City)	Ongoing	Ongoing	Swansea City
(Scotland)	Liam Smith	28 October 2003	Midfielder	31 August 2024 (Scottish Championship with Partick Thistle)	0	0	Free Agent
(Ecuador)	**Aimar Govea**	8 June 2006	Midfielder	29 March 2024 (EFL Championship with Swansea City)	Ongoing	Ongoing	Swansea City
(Czech Republic)	**Filip Lissah**	8 December 2004	Defender	25 January 2024 (FA Cup with Swansea City)	Ongoing	Ongoing	Swansea City
(Wales)	**Sam Parker**	7 July 2006	Defender	29 December 2023 (EFL Championship with Swansea City)	Ongoing	Ongoing	Swansea City
(Wales)	Josh Thomas	24 September 2002	Forward	5 August 2023 (EFL League One with Port Vale)	1	0	Fleetwood Town
(Wales)	**Joel Cotterill**	10 October 2004	Midfielder	9 August 2022 (EFL Cup with Swansea City)	Ongoing	Ongoing	Swansea City
(Wales)	Cameron Congreve	24 January 2004	Midfielder	12 March 2022 (EFL Championship with Swansea City)	19	0	KVC Westerlo and Wales International
(Iraq)	Ali Al-Hamadi	1 March 2002	Forward	16 November 2021 (2022 FIFA World Cup qualification with Iraq)	0	0	Ipswich Town and Iraq International
(Wales)	Daniel Williams	19 April 2001	Midfielder	10 August 2021 (EFL Cup with Swansea City)	0	0	The New Saints
(Wales)	Cameron Evans	23 February 2001	Defender	9 January 2021 (FA Cup with Swansea City)	0	0	Newport County
(Wales)	**Oliver Cooper**	14 December 1999	Midfielder	9 January 2021 (FA Cup with Swansea City)	Ongoing	Ongoing	Swansea City and Wales International

=== 2010s ===
	Player	DOB	Position	Professional Debut	Appearances	Goals	Current club
(Zimbabwe)	Tivonge Rushesha	24 July 2002	Defender	28 August 2019 (EFL Cup with Swansea City)	0	0	FK Radnik Bijeljina
(Wales)	Jack Evans	25 April 1998	Midfielder	28 August 2019 (EFL Cup with Swansea City)	0	0	Free Agent
(Jamaica)	Jordon Garrick	15 July 1998	Forward	13 August 2019 (EFL Cup with Swansea City)	14	2	Merthyr Town
(Netherlands)	Kees de Boer	13 May 2000	Midfielder	13 August 2019 (EFL Cup with Swansea City)	0	0	Salernitana
(Wales)	**Ben Cabango**	30 May 2000	Defender	13 August 2019 (EFL Cup with Swansea City)	Ongoing	Ongoing	Swansea City and Wales International
(Wales)	Aaron Lewis	26 June 1998	Defender	13 August 2019 (EFL Cup with Lincoln City)	0	0	Free Agent
(Wales)	Lewis Thomas	20 September 1997	Goalkeeper	3 August 2019 (League Two with Forest Green Rovers)	0	0	Bristol City
(Wales)	Liam Cullen	23 April 1999	Forward	28 August 2018 (EFL Cup with Swansea City)	207	37	Leicester City and Wales International
(Wales)	Brandon Cooper	14 January 2000	Defender	28 August 2018 (EFL Cup with Swansea City)	5	0	Salford City
(Sweden)	Adnan Marić	17 February 1997	Midfielder	6 February 2018 (EFL Cup with Swansea City)	0	0	Arendal
(Wales)	Daniel James	10 November 1997	Winger	6 February 2018 (EFL Cup with Swansea City)	39	6	Leeds United and Wales International
(Wales)	Joe Rodon	22 October 1997	Defender	3 February 2018 (League Two with Cheltenham Town)	52	0	Leeds United and Wales International
(Wales)	Keston Davies	2 October 1996	Defender	5 August 2017 (League Two with Yeovil Town)	0	0	Barry Town United
(Cyprus)	Alex Gogić	13 April 1994	Defender	11 March 2017 (Scottish Premiership with Hibernian)	0	0	St Mirren and Cyprus International
(Wales)	Owain Jones	1 October 1996	Striker	4 February 2017 (League Two with Yeovil Town)	0	0	Haverfordwest County
(Wales)	Kyle Copp	1 November 1996	Midfielder	30 August 2016 (EFL Trophy with Yeovil Town)	0	0	Pure Swansea
(Wales)	Alex Samuel	20 September 1995	Striker	5 September 2015 (Scottish Championship with Morton)	0	0	Partick Thistle
(Wales)	Connor Roberts	23 September 1995	Defender	8 August 2015 (League Two with Yeovil Town)	133	11	Burnley and Wales International
(Netherlands)	Kenji Gorre	29 September 1994	Midfielder	24 May 2015 (Premier League with Swansea City)	1	0	Maccabi Haifa and Curaçao International
(Wales)	Liam Shephard	22 November 1994	Defender	20 January 2015 (League One with Yeovil Town)	0	0	Penybont
(Wales)	Scott Tancock	29 December 1993	Defender	27 September 2014 (League Two with Newport County)	0	0	Morriston Town
(Wales)	Dan Hanford	6 March 1991	Goalkeeper	27 September 2014 (League Two with Carlisle United)	0	0	Free Agent
(Wales)	Alex Bray	25 July 1995	Winger	6 September 2014 (League Two with Plymouth Argyle)	0	0	Free Agent
(Antigua and Barbuda)	Connor Peters	21 June 1996	Defender	3 September 2014 (2014 Caribbean Cup qualification with Antigua and Barbuda)	0	0	Antigua and Barbuda International
(Wales)	Josh Sheehan	30 March 1995	Midfielder	26 August 2014 (EFL Cup with Swansea City)	0	0	Bolton Wanderers and Wales International
(Wales)	James Loveridge	16 May 1994	Forward	22 March 2014 (League One with Milton Keynes Dons)	0	0	Free Agent
(Wales)	Gwion Edwards	1 March 1993	Winger	2 February 2013 (Scottish Premier League with St Johnstone)	0	0	Exeter City
(Wales)	Emyr Huws	30 September 1993	Midfielder	13 October 2012 (League Two with Northampton Town)	0	0	Retired Wales International
(Wales)	Ben Davies	24 April 1993	Defender	25 August 2012 (Premier League with Swansea City)	85	3	Tottenham Hotspur and Wales International
(England)	Jack King	20 August 1985	Midfielder	18 August 2012 (League One with Preston North End)	0	0	Retired
(Wales)	Tom John	22 March 1995	Midfielder	23 August 2011 (EFL Cup with Hereford United)	0	0	Retired
(Wales)	Lee Lucas	10 June 1992	Midfielder	7 May 2011 (Championship with Swansea City)	1	0	Merthyr Town
(Wales)	Daniel Alfei	23 February 1992	Defender	8 January 2011 (FA Cup with Swansea City)	3	0	Pontardawe Town
(Wales)	Joe Walsh	13 May 1992	Defender	10 August 2010 (EFL Cup with Swansea City)	2	0	Free Agent

=== 2000s ===
	Player	DOB	Position	Professional Debut	Appearances	Goals	Current club
(Wales)	David Cornell	28 March 1991	Goalkeeper	25 August 2009 (EFL Cup with Swansea City)	0	0	Preston North End
(Wales)	Jazz Richards	12 April 1991	Defender	15 August 2009 (vs Middlesbrough)	51	0	Retired Wales International
(Wales)	Casey Thomas	12 April 1990	Forward	15 August 2009 (vs Middlesbrough)	2	0	Moreland City FC
(Wales)	Kerry Morgan	31 October 1988	Winger	11 August 2009 (vs Brighton & Hove Albion)	6	0	Free Agent
(Wales)	Marley Watkins	17 October 1990	Winger	8 August 2008 (League One with Cheltenham Town)	0	0	Free Agent and Wales International
(Wales)	Kyle Letheren	26 December 1987	Goalkeeper	5 January 2008 (FA Cup with Barnsley)	0	0	Retired
(Wales)	Joe Allen	14 March 1990	Midfielder	5 May 2007 (vs Blackpool)	228	8	Retired Wales International
(Wales)	Chris Jones	12 September 1989	Forward	17 October 2006 (vs Walsall)	7	0	Free Agent
(Wales)	Chad Bond	20 April 1987	Forward	22 November 2005 (vs Rushden & Diamonds)	3	0	Retired
(Wales)	Shaun MacDonald	17 June 1988	Midfielder	23 August 2004 (vs Reading)	40	2	Trefelin BGC and Wales International
(Wales)	Jamie Rewbury	15 February 1986	Defender	10 April 2004 (vs Lincoln City)	2	0	Retired
(Wales)	Mark Pritchard	23 November 1985	Forward	21 October 2003 (vs Cambridge United)	7	1	Retired
(England)	Antonio Corbisiero	17 November 1984	Midfielder	30 August 2003 (vs Mansfield Town)	5	0	Retired
(Wales)	Stuart Jones	14 March 1984	Defender	22 October 2002 (vs Stevenage Borough)	38	0	Retired
(Wales)	Craig Draper	4 December 1982	Midfielder	9 October 2001 (vs Rochdale)	2	0	Retired
(Wales)	Richard Duffy	30 August 1985	Defender	8 December 2001 (vs Macclesfield Town)	29	1	Retired Wales International
(Wales)	Chris Todd	22 August 1981	Defender	10 March 2001 (vs Northampton Town)	46	4	Retired
(Wales)	Alex Davies	2 November 1982	Goalkeeper	10 March 2001 (vs Bury)	1	0	Retired
(Wales)	Carl Mounty	11 December 1981	Goalkeeper	14 February 2001 (vs Brentford)	1	0	Retired
(Wales)	Bari Morgan	13 August 1980	Midfielder	9 September 2000 (vs Brentford)	5	0	Retired
(England)	Michael Keegan	12 May 1981	Midfielder	22 August 2000 (vs West Bromwich Albion)	11	0	Retired
