= Gary Richards (footballer) =

Welsh footballer & coach (born 1963)

Personal information
- Full name: Gary Vivian Richards
- Date of birth: 2 August 1963 (age 63)
- Place of birth: Swansea, Wales
- Height: 5 ft 8 in (1.73 m)
- Position: Defender

Team information
- Current team: Haverfordwest County (assistant manager)

Youth career
- Swansea City

Senior career*
Years	Team	Apps	(Gls)
1981–1985	Swansea City	66	(1)
1985	Jönköpings Södra IF		
1985–1986	Lincoln City	7	(0)
1985–1986	Cambridge United	8	(0)
1986–1987	Torquay United	25	(1)
- Newport County
- Llanelli
- Saltash United
1990–1991	Forest Green Rovers		
- Barry Town
- Haverfordwest County

Managerial career
- 2003–2015: Swansea City (U16s lead coach)
- 2015–2016: Swansea City (U18s lead coach)
- 2016–2019: Swansea City (U23s lead coach)
- 2017: Swansea City (first team coach)
- 2019–2020: Pafos (assistant manager)
- 2021–: Haverfordwest County (assistant manager)
- * Club domestic league appearances and goals

Gary Richards (born 2 August 1963) is a Welsh football coach and former professional footballer. He is best known for his time spent both as a footballer and coach at his hometown club Swansea City. He is currently assistant manager at Haverfordwest County of the Welsh Premier League.

== Club career ==
Richards began his career as an apprentice footballer at Swansea City, turning professional in August 1981. He made his first team league debut at the end of the 1981–82 season in Swansea's 3–0 defeat away to Aston Villa. This was Villa's last league match before going on to win the European Cup. He would go on to make 15 league appearances the following season, whilst also playing in, and winning the 1983 Welsh Cup beating Wrexham 4–1 in the final. Richards also picked up the young player of the year award, for his performances that season. He was a regular the following season in the old Division 2, appearing 34 times, but Swansea slipped to a second successive relegation. He reached only 16 appearances in the 1984–85 season, departing at the end of the campaign for a spell in Sweden with Jonkopings Sodra IF.

Returning to the Football League, Richards linked up with Lincoln City, making his debut in the 1–1 home draw with Bristol City on 6 November 1985. Following the sacking of Lincoln's manager John Pickering, Richards found himself out of favour and moved on loan to Cambridge United, playing all 8 remaining league fixtures of that season. In July 1986 he moved to Torquay United where, in his first season, playing against his hometown club, having scored after sixteen seconds, he sustained a serious knee injury which would cause the end of his professional league career. Whilst rehabilitating Richards would have his first taste of coaching, helping run the youth and reserve teams. Richards turned down the offer of the role on a full-time basis from then manager Cyril Knowles, preferring instead to move into the non-league ranks and continue playing for firstly, Newport County in the Conference League in their ill-fated 1988–89 season, before going on to enjoy short spells with Saltash, Forest Green Rovers, Barry Town, Llanelli, and Haverfordwest County where a repeat of a ruptured cruciate ligament would bring a close to his playing days. .

== International career ==
Richards earned 7 caps for Wales U18s over a two-year period. First year (1981) overcoming the Republic of Ireland in a two-leg affair, with Richards scoring the first of the goals in a 0–2 win in the Republic, which followed a 2–2 draw at the Vetch Field in Swansea. The win meant Wales qualified for the UEFA European Championships which was held in West Germany, where Wales finished a credible sixth in a sixteen-team tournament.

Richards whilst at Newport County also earned one semi-professional cap in a 1–0 defeat against England held at Kidderminster Harriers.

== Coaching career ==
Having moved back to Swansea, in August 2011 Richards took a sabbatical from his job in the Royal Mail to take up a full time coaching role at Swansea City Academy as Lead U16 coach as well as head of the youth development phase, having already worked for the club on a part-times basis since 2003. In 2015 Richards was promoted to the U18s as well as overseeing the professional development phase. After only one season in the role he was again promoted to the U23 age group. That season, Richards U23s team gained promotion to the PDL Division 1, winning the Division 2 league by an 11-point margin. Additionally, that season the team also did the double by winning the Premier League Cup, as well as reaching the semi-finals of the Premier League International Cup and the quarterfinals of the EFL Trophy, losing out to Porto and Coventry City on penalties respectively. During his time with the academy Richards saw a number of players gain promotion to the senior team. This included Joe Allen, Ben Davies, Joe Rodon, Connor Roberts, Daniel James, and Oli McBurnie, with the afore mentioned also achieving senior international status.

In December 2017 Richards was appointed first team coach under Leon Britton in the Premier League on an interim basis following the departure of Paul Clement as manager, taking charge of games against Crystal Palace at home and Liverpool away.

In December 2019 Richards departed Swansea City to move to Cypriot first division side Pafos FC, as assistant to Cameron Toshack. At the time of taking over Pafos were one place above relegation, with only three wins. They finished the season in seventh place, the clubs best ever finish, with the team achieving an impressive five wins out of six for the month of February.

In October 2020 Richards left Pafos having contributed to the clubs longest unbeaten run in their history, as well as achieving their highest win percentage.

== Coaching qualifications ==
Richards holds the UEFA A License, UEFA B License, UEFA C License, as well as the FA Advanced Youth Award (professional development phase). He's gained a level 5 diploma in management & leadership and has been a candidate on the Premier League's elite coach apprenticeship scheme (ECAS). He also holds the FA level 2 in talent identification.

== Honours ==
Swansea City

Player:

- Welsh Cup winner: 1983

Coach:

- FAW Welsh Youth Cup: 2009, 2015
- Premier League 2, Div 2 winners: 2017
- Premier League Cup winners: 2017
- Premier League Cup runners-up: 2018

== Personal life ==
In 2000 Richards helped set up the Swansea City Bravehearts, a football club for children with disabilities. He attended a garden party at Buckingham Palace in 2003 to receive the Queens Award for Voluntary Services on behalf of the club. The same year he was also awarded the City of Swansea Coach of the year for his work with the special needs club.
