= 2016–17 Professional U23 Development League =

The 2016–17 Professional U23 Development League was the fifth season of the Professional Development League system, and the first since the age limit was raised from under-21 to under-23.

== League 1 ==
Premier League 2
- Season: 2016–17
- Champions: Division 1 Everton U23s (1st Title); Division 2 Swansea City U23s (1st Title)
- Promoted: Swansea City U23s; West Ham United U23s
- Relegated: Reading U23s; Southampton U23s
- Matches: 267 (264 RS, 3 PO)
- Goals: 813 (3.04 per match) (805 RS, 8 PO)
- Best player: (Scotland) Oliver McBurnie Swansea City U23s
- Top goalscorer: Overall (England) Donovan Wilson Wolverhampton Wanderers U23s (13 Goals); Division 1 (Wales) Harry Wilson Liverpool U23s (12 Goals); Division 2 (England) Donovan Wilson Wolverhampton Wanderers U23s (13 Goals)
- Biggest home win: Leicester City U23s 5–0 Derby County U23s (18 November 2016)
- Biggest away win: Arsenal U23s 0–5 Everton U23s (19 September 2016)
- Highest scoring: Reading U23s 3–6 Everton U23s (17 October 2016)
- Longest winning run: 9 Matches Swansea City U23s
- Longest unbeaten run: 10 Matches Manchester City EDS
- Longest winless run: 12 Matches Middlesbrough U23s
- Longest losing run: 6 Matches Middlesbrough U23s
- Highest attendance: 17,525 Everton U23s 1–2 Liverpool U23s (8 May 2017)
- Lowest attendance: 52 Stoke City U23s 2–4 Aston Villa U23s (26 November 2016)

Premier League 2 (previously the Under 21 Premier League) was the fifth season of the competition since its introduction in 2012, and the first since being changed from an under-21 league to under-23.

The league was split into two divisions, with teams allocated places in Division 1 or 2 based on their performance in the 2015–16 season.

At the end of the season, the team which finished top of Division 1 was crowned as overall champions, and the bottom two teams in Division 1 will be relegated to Division 2 for the 2017–18 season.

=== Division 1 ===
==== Table ====
Pos	Team	Pld	W	D	L	GF	GA	GD	Pts	Relegation
1	Everton U23s (C)	22	15	3	4	48	21	+27	48	
2	Manchester City EDS	22	13	6	3	54	33	+21	45	
3	Liverpool U23s	22	13	4	5	47	27	+20	43	
4	Arsenal U23s	22	10	3	9	40	32	+8	33	
5	Chelsea U23s	22	7	9	6	40	32	+8	30	
6	Manchester United U23s	22	6	8	8	29	38	−9	26	
7	Sunderland U23s	22	6	7	9	27	37	−10	25	
8	Derby County U23s	22	6	6	10	31	42	−11	24	
9	Leicester City U23s	22	5	8	9	31	42	−11	23	
10	Tottenham Hotspur U23s	22	6	4	12	33	44	−11	22	
11	Reading U23s (R)	22	6	4	12	36	56	−20	22	Relegation to Division 2
12	Southampton U23s (R)	22	5	6	11	28	40	−12	21	Relegation to Division 2

Updated to match(es) played on 15 May 2017. Source:
(C) Champions; (R) Relegated

==== Results ====
Home \ Away	ARS	CHE	DER	EVE	LEI	LIV	MNC	MNU	REA	SOT	SUN	TOT
Arsenal U23s		4–1	2–1	0–5	3–0	1–3	3–3	2–2	0–2	0–0	4–0	2–0
Chelsea U23s	1–2		2–2	2–2	0–0	4–1	3–4	3–1	2–0	3–2	3–0	3–1
Derby County U23s	1–3	2–1		2–3	0–0	0–0	2–3	5–3	2–1	2–0	0–0	1–2
Everton U23s	1–0	1–1	2–0		4–1	1–2	1–0	2–0	3–0	2–0	0–1	4–1
Leicester City U23s	2–1	0–4	5–0	1–4		1–3	3–3	0–0	3–2	0–2	2–3	2–0
Liverpool U23s	3–2	2–0	1–2	2–0	4–0		3–2	0–1	2–0	1–4	3–0	3–2
Manchester City EDS	1–0	2–2	4–1	3–0	1–1	1–0		1–1	2–1	4–2	4–1	2–2
Manchester United U23s	1–0	1–1	3–2	1–3	1–0	1–1	1–3		0–2	3–3	0–2	3–2
Reading U23s	2–5	2–1	3–3	3–6	2–2	1–5	3–2	2–2		4–2	3–2	1–4
Southampton U23s	1–3	0–0	0–1	1–1	2–2	2–2	0–3	2–0	3–1		0–2	1–0
Sunderland U23s	2–1	1–1	2–2	0–1	2–2	0–0	2–4	1–3	1–1	3–0		2–2
Tottenham Hotspur U23s	0–2	2–2	2–0	0–2	1–4	2–6	1–2	1–1	4–0	3–1	1–0	

Source: Premier League 2 Division 1 results
Legend: Blue = home team win; Yellow = draw; Red = away team win.

=== Division 2 ===
==== Table ====
Pos	Team	Pld	W	D	L	GF	GA	GD	Pts	Promotion or qualification
1	Swansea City U23s (P)	22	17	1	4	43	22	+21	52	Promotion to Division 1
2	Wolverhampton Wanderers U23s	22	12	5	5	42	30	+12	41	Qualification for Play-offs
3	Newcastle United U23s	22	11	4	7	34	30	+4	37	Qualification for Play-offs
4	Fulham U23s	22	10	3	9	39	33	+6	33	Qualification for Play-offs
5	West Ham United U23s (P)	22	9	6	7	32	26	+6	33	Qualification for Play-offs
6	Blackburn Rovers U23s	22	9	5	8	24	28	−4	32	
7	Aston Villa U23s	22	8	6	8	34	32	+2	30	
8	Brighton & Hove Albion U23s	22	7	7	8	20	22	−2	28	
9	West Bromwich Albion U23s	22	6	4	12	25	33	−8	22	
10	Middlesbrough U23s	22	5	6	11	25	34	−9	21	
11	Stoke City U23s	22	4	8	10	25	36	−11	20	
12	Norwich City U23s	22	4	5	13	18	35	−17	17	

Updated to match(es) played on 24 April 2017. Source:
(P) Promoted

==== Results ====
Home \ Away	AST	BLB	B&H	FUL	MID	NEW	NOR	STO	SWA	WBA	WHU	WOL
Aston Villa U23s		4–0	2–0	3–3	0–0	4–0	1–2	0–2	1–2	2–5	2–0	0–1
Blackburn Rovers U23s	0–0		2–0	3–2	0–0	0–2	2–0	1–1	0–1	2–1	2–1	3–2
Brighton & Hove Albion U23s	1–1	0–0		1–0	4–2	1–2	1–1	2–0	1–0	2–1	3–0	2–1
Fulham U23s	3–0	1–0	4–0		1–0	2–1	0–1	2–0	2–1	1–1	4–1	1–4
Middlesbrough U23s	1–2	4–1	0–0	1–4		0–2	2–2	2–2	2–1	2–1	0–1	0–1
Newcastle United U23s	4–2	1–2	1–0	3–1	2–0		1–2	1–1	3–2	1–1	0–0	0–0
Norwich City U23s	0–1	1–3	0–0	2–2	1–2	0–3		0–1	0–2	2–1	0–2	0–1
Stoke City U23s	2–4	0–1	1–1	1–2	3–1	2–3	1–1		1–4	2–1	0–3	1–1
Swansea City U23s	2–0	2–1	1–0	2–0	3–2	3–1	2–0	2–1		1–0	2–0	2–2
West Bromwich Albion U23s	3–3	1–0	1–0	2–1	0–0	0–1	2–1	2–1	0–1		0–4	0–1
West Ham United U23s	0–0	1–1	0–0	2–0	1–3	3–1	2–1	1–1	2–3	2–1		2–2
Wolverhampton Wanderers U23s	1–2	3–0	2–1	4–3	2–1	4–1	3–1	1–1	3–4	3–1	0–4	

Source: Premier League 2 Division 2 results
Legend: Blue = home team win; Yellow = draw; Red = away team win.

=== Play-offs ===
Semifinals
2	Wolverhampton Wanderers U23s	1
5	West Ham United U23s	2
3	Newcastle United U23s	2
4	Fulham U23s	0

Final
3	Newcastle United U23s	1
5	West Ham United U23s	2

==== Semifinals ====
8 May 2017
13:00

Newcastle United U23s	2–0	Fulham U23s
Holmes 6'; Findlay 35'	Report

St. James' Park, Newcastle
Attendance: 437
Referee: Thomas Bramall

8 May 2017
13:00

Wolverhampton Wanderers U23s	1–2	West Ham United U23s
Deslandes 25'	Report	Hector-Ingram 80'; Samuelsen 90+1'

Molineux Stadium, Wolverhampton
Attendance: 772
Referee: Joseph Johnson

==== Final ====
16 May 2017
13:00

Newcastle United U23s	1–2	West Ham United U23s
Heardman 19'	Report	Martínez 43', 54'

St. James' Park, Newcastle
Attendance: 1,824
Referee: Tom Nield

=== Top goalscorers ===
As of 16 May 2017

Rank	Player	Club	Goals
1	(England) Donovan Wilson	Wolverhampton Wanderers U23s	13
2	(England) Stephen Humphrys	Fulham U23s	12
2	(Spain) Toni Martínez	West Ham United U23s	12
2	(Wales) Harry Wilson	Liverpool U23s	12
5	(Scotland) Oliver McBurnie	Swansea City U23s	11
5	(Spain) Paolo Fernandes	Manchester City EDS	11
5	(Canada) Ike Ugbo	Chelsea U23s	11
8	(Germany) Lukas Nmecha	Manchester City EDS	9
9	(England) Josh Harrop	Manchester United U23s	8
9	(United States) Andrija Novakovich	Everton U23s	8
9	(Wales) George Williams	Fulham U23s	8
9	(Wales) Ben Woodburn	Liverpool U23s	8
13	(Senegal) Oumar Niasse	Everton U23s	7
13	(Republic of Ireland) Harry Charsley	Everton U23s	7
13	(England) Charles Vernam	Derby County U23s	7
13	(England) Shayon Harrison	Tottenham Hotspur U23s	7
13	(England) Rushian Hepburn-Murphy	Aston Villa U23s	7
13	(Morocco) Brahim Diaz	Manchester City EDS	7
13	(Belgium) Julien Ngoy	Stoke City U23s	7
13	(England) Olufela Olomola	Southampton U23s	7

=== Hat-tricks ===
As of 16 May 2017

Player	For	Against	Result	Date	Division	Ref.
(Czech Republic) Libor Kozak	Aston Villa U23s	Newcastle United U23s	4–0 (H)	29 August 2016	Division 2	
(England) Donovan Wilson	Wolverhampton Wanderers U23s	Newcastle United U23s	4–1 (H)	14 October 2016	Division 2	
(Senegal) Oumar Niasse	Everton U23s	Reading U23s	3–6 (A)	17 October 2016	Division 1	
(England) Stephen Humphrys	Fulham U23s	Middlesbrough U23s	1–4 (A)	18 November 2016	Division 2	
(England) Edward Nketiah	Arsenal U23s	Leicester City U23s	3–0 (H)	28 November 2016	Division 1	
(Spain) Toni Martínez	West Ham United U23s	Wolverhampton Wanderers U23s	0–4 (A)	19 December 2016	Division 2	
(Scotland) Oliver McBurnie	Swansea City U23s	Newcastle United U23s	3–1 (H)	16 January 2017	Division 2	
(Morocco) Brahim Diaz	Manchester City EDS	Chelsea U23s	3–4 (A)	18 February 2017	Division 1	
(Finland) Mikael Soisalo	Middlesbrough U23s	Blackburn Rovers U23s	4–1 (H)	13 March 2017	Division 2	
(France) Yaya Sanogo	Arsenal U23s	Reading U23s	2–5 (A)	10 April 2017	Division 1	
(England) Josh Harrop	Manchester United U23s	Tottenham Hotspur U23s	2–5 (A)	15 May 2017	Division 1	

Note

(H) – Home; (A) – Away
^{4} – player scored 4 goals

=== Awards ===
Player of the Year: (Scotland) Oliver McBurnie (Swansea City U23s)

=== Player of the Month ===
Month	Player	Club	Ref.
August	(England) Ethan Robson	Sunderland U23s	
September	(England) Rushian Hepburn-Murphy	Aston Villa U23s	
October	(Spain) Paolo Fernandes	Manchester City EDS	
November	(England) Josh Sims	Southampton U23s	
December	(England) Jonathan Leko	West Bromwich Albion U23s	
January	(Scotland) Oliver McBurnie	Swansea City U23s	
February	(England) Liam Walsh	Everton U23s	
March	(Belgium) Julien Ngoy	Stoke City U23s	
April	(England) Kieran Dowell	Everton U23s	

== League 2 ==
U23 Professional Development League
- Season: 2016–17
- Champions: Sheffield Wednesday U23s (1st Title)
- Regular Season Champions: Charlton Athletic U23s (1st Title)
- Matches: 283 (280 RS, 3 PO)
- Goals: 933 (3.3 per match) (920 RS, 13 PO)
- Top goalscorer: (Scotland) George Hirst Sheffield Wednesday U23s (16 Goals)
- Biggest home win: Ipswich Town U23s 8–0 Watford U23s (6 February 2017)
- Biggest away win: Colchester United U23s 1–7 Queens Park Rangers U23s (17 April 2017)
- Highest scoring: Charlton Athletic U23s 7–2 Coventry City U23s (5 September 2016); Sheffield United U23s 6–3 Nottingham Forest U23s (19 December 2016)
- Longest winning run: 6 Matches Sheffield Wednesday U23s
- Longest unbeaten run: 12 Matches Charlton Athletic U23s
- Longest winless run: 14 Matches Leeds United U23s
- Longest losing run: 5 Matches Crystal Palace U23s; Leeds United U23s; Millwall U23s
- Highest attendance: 2,745 Sheffield Wednesday U23s 3–1 Hull City U23s (12 May 2017)

The Professional U23 Development League 2, also known as U23 PDL-2, is split into two regional divisions.

Teams will play each team in their own division twice, and each team in the other division once, for a total of 28 games each.

At the end of the season, the teams finishing in the top two positions of both divisions will meet in the knockout stage to determine the overall league champion. 20 Teams competed this season, 1 fewer than last time. Brentford withdrawing at the end of last season after they closed their academy meant Coventry City moved to the south division for an even distribution of 10 teams per division.

=== Tables ===
==== North Division ====
Pos	Team	Pld	W	D	L	GF	GA	GD	Pts	Qualification
1	Sheffield Wednesday U23s	28	15	5	8	43	28	+15	50	Qualification for Knock-out stage
2	Hull City U23s	28	15	3	10	51	42	+9	48	Qualification for Knock-out stage
3	Bolton Wanderers U23s	28	13	7	8	53	42	+11	46	
4	Birmingham City U23s	28	13	7	8	47	39	+8	46	
5	Crewe Alexandra U23s	28	13	7	8	53	46	+7	46	
6	Huddersfield Town U23s	28	13	5	10	54	42	+12	44	
7	Sheffield United U23s	28	12	6	10	49	43	+6	42	
8	Nottingham Forest U23s	28	10	5	13	43	39	+4	35	
9	Barnsley U23s	28	9	4	15	35	50	−15	31	
10	Leeds United U23s	28	6	6	16	33	52	−19	24	

==== South Division ====
Pos	Team	Pld	W	D	L	GF	GA	GD	Pts	Qualification
1	Charlton Athletic U23s	28	15	8	5	53	26	+27	53	Qualification for Knock-out stage
2	Millwall U23s	28	12	6	10	47	33	+14	42	Qualification for Knock-out stage
3	Cardiff City U23s	28	10	8	10	46	44	+2	38	
4	Coventry City U23s	28	11	5	12	50	58	−8	38	
5	Bristol City U23s	28	10	6	12	45	49	−4	36	
6	Queens Park Rangers U23s	28	11	3	14	51	63	−12	36	
7	Ipswich Town U23s	28	11	2	15	57	54	+3	35	
8	Colchester United U23s	28	8	9	11	42	56	−14	33	
9	Watford U23s	28	9	5	14	42	65	−23	32	
10	Crystal Palace U23s	28	8	5	15	26	49	−23	29	

=== Knock-out stage ===
Semi-finals

8 May 2017
19:00

Sheffield Wednesday U23s	2–1	Millwall U23s
Hirst		Philpot

Hillsborough, Sheffield
Attendance: 1,059

8 May 2017
19:00

Charlton Athletic U23s	3–3 (a.e.t.)	Hull City U23s
Hanlan 103'; Ahearne-Grant 105'; Charles-Cook 109'	Report	Bowen 94'; Ter Horst 102'; Edwards 120'
Penalties
Charles-Cook (penalty missed); Doughty (penalty scored); Hackett-Fairchild (penalty scored); Lapslie (penalty scored); Ahearne-Grant (penalty scored)	4–5	(penalty scored) McKenzie; (penalty scored) Bowen; (penalty scored) Edwards; (penalty scored) Olley; (penalty scored) Clackstone

The Valley, Charlton
Attendance: 290
Referee: P Kelly

Final

12 May 2017
19:00

Sheffield Wednesday U23s	3–1	Hull City U23s
Hirst 9', 25'; Williams 65'		McKenzie 41' (pen.)

Hillsborough, Sheffield
Attendance: 2,745

=== Top goalscorers ===
As of 12 May 2017

Rank	Player	Club	Goals
1	(Scotland) George Hirst	Sheffield Wednesday U23s	16
2	(Chile) Ben Brereton	Nottingham Forest U23s	13
2	(England) Ebere Eze	Queens Park Rangers U23s	13
2	(Wales) Callum Saunders	Crewe Alexandra U23s	13
5	(England) Karlan Ahearne-Grant	Charlton Athletic U23s	12
5	(England) Ben Morris	Sheffield United U23s	12
7	(England) Michael Folivi	Coventry City U23s/Watford U23s	11
7	(Northern Ireland) Mikhail Kennedy	Charlton Athletic U23s	11
7	(Nigeria) Daniel Udoh	Crewe Alexandra U23s	11
10	(Scotland) Will Annan	Hull City U23s	10
10	(England) Jarrod Bowen	Hull City U23s	10
10	(England) Jordan Hallam	Sheffield United U23s	10
10	(England) Devon Kelly-Evans	Coventry City U23s	10
10	(England) Noel Leighton	Millwall U23s	10
10	(England) Shawn McCoulsky	Bristol City U23s	10
10	(Iran) Alex Samizadeh	Bolton Wanderers U23s	10
10	(Republic of Ireland) Eoghan Stokes	Leeds United U23s	10
10	(Wales) George Thomas	Coventry City U23s	10
10	(England) Joshua Umerah	Charlton Athletic U23s	10

=== Hat-tricks ===
As of 12 May 2017

Player	For	Against	Result	Date	Ref.
(England) Jonathan Edwards	Hull City U23s	Bristol City U23s	5–0 (H)	22 August 2016	
(England) Ebere Eze	Queens Park Rangers U23s	Crystal Palace U23s	4–1 (H)	5 September 2016	
(Iran) Alex Samizadeh^{4}	Bolton Wanderers U23s	Queens Park Rangers U23s	6–1 (H)	12 September 2016	
(England) Devon Kelly-Evans	Coventry City U23s	Barnsley U23s	1–4 (A)	30 September 2016	
(Chile) Ben Brereton^{4}	Nottingham Forest U23s	Queens Park Rangers U23s	0–5 (A)	7 October 2016	
(England) Shawn McCoulsky	Bristol City U23s	Colchester United U23s	0–5 (A)	14 November 2016	
(Sweden) Marcus Antonsson	Leeds United U23s	Huddersfield Town U23s	2–3 (A)	21 November 2016	
(Italy) Diego De Girolamo	Bristol City U23s	Cardiff City U23s	3–3 (H)	12 December 2016	
(Republic of Ireland) Reece Grego-Cox	Queens Park Rangers U23s	Coventry City U23s	0–3 (A)	30 January 2017	
(Northern Ireland) Mikhail Kennedy	Charlton Athletic U23s	Ipswich Town U23s	4–0 (H)	30 January 2017	
(England) Shawn McCoulsky	Bristol City U23s	Colchester United U23s	4–1 (H)	30 January 2017	
(New Zealand) Monty Patterson	Ipswich Town U23s	Watford U23s	8–0 (H)	6 February 2017	
(England) Dominic Samuel	Ipswich Town U23s	Watford U23s	8–0 (H)	6 February 2017	
(Wales) James Waite^{4}	Cardiff City U23s	Watford U23s	7–1 (H)	6 March 2017	
(Scotland) George Hirst	Sheffield Wednesday U23s	Hull City U23s	2–3 (A)	6 March 2017	
(England) Jordan Hallam^{4}	Sheffield United U23s	Bristol City U23s	5–0 (H)	27 March 2017	
(England) Shawn McCoulsky	Bristol City U23s	Watford U23s	4–1 (H)	10 April 2017	
(England) Aramide Oteh^{4}	Queens Park Rangers U23s	Colchester United U23s	1–7 (A)	17 April 2017	

Note

(H) – Home; (A) – Away
^{4} – player scored 4 goals

== See also ==
- 2016–17 Professional U18 Development League
- 2016–17 Premier League Cup
- 2016–17 in English football
