= Gary Finley =

English footballer (born 1970)

Personal information
- Date of birth: 14 November 1970 (age 55)
- Place of birth: Liverpool, England
- Position: Central defender

Senior career*
Years	Team	Apps	(Gls)
- Marine
- Warrington Town
- Vauxhall Motors
- Warrington Town
- Curzon Ashton
- Netherfield
1997	Doncaster Rovers	8	(0)
- Netherfield
1997–1998	Hyde United	8	(0)
1998–1999	Conwy United	41	(3)
1999–2004	Aberystwyth Town	116	(5)
2004	Total Network Solutions	1	(0)
2004	Colwyn Bay (loan)		
2004–2005	Witton Albion		

Managerial career
- 2001–2004: Aberystwyth Town
- 2004–2005: Witton Albion
- 2006: Lancaster City
- 2007–2008: Colwyn Bay
- 2008–2010: Witton Albion
- * Club domestic league appearances and goals

Gary Finley (born 14 November 1970) is a former professional football central defender and non-league manager. He played in the Football League for Doncaster Rovers and was most recently Assistant Professional Development Coach at Blackburn Rovers .

== Career ==
Born in Liverpool, Finley played for Marine, Warrington Town, Vauxhall Motors, Curzon Ashton and Netherfield before joining Doncaster Rovers. He made his debut in the League Cup in August 1997, as Doncaster lost 2–1 away to Nottingham Forest, and played eight times in the league that season as they were relegated to the Conference. Upon leaving Doncaster he returned to Netherfield, moving on to Hyde United and to Welsh side Conwy United in 1998 before joining Aberystwyth Town in November 1999.

He became player-manager of Aberystwyth in December 2001, a post he held until resigning less than a fortnight before the 2004–05 season, after the club's most successful period in 20 years. They reached their highest league placing, winning the MWC Cup and qualifying for the Inter Toto cup, drawing the home leg before finally bowing out to Dinaburg FC from Latvia. On leaving Aberystwyth, he had a brief spell as a player with Total Network Solutions, also appearing for Colwyn Bay on seconds forms, before becoming player-manager at Witton Albion in November 2004. He and his assistant Lee Coathup left Witton by mutual consent in October 2005, following the club stating that it would be reducing the playing budget.

Finley was appointed assistant manager at Lancaster City in December 2005, remaining in that post until July 2006 when he took over as manager from the departed Peter Ward. In January 2007, he took over as manager of Colwyn Bay, where a massive upsurge in form saw them qualify for the Unibond playoffs, only to lose to Cammell Laird in injury time.

In 2008-15 Finley joined Blackburn Rovers category 1 academy, where he was Professional Development Coach.

For several years now, Gary Finley has been a full-time youth coach for Blackburn Rovers Football team academy where he is in charge of professional development for 18–23 age group.

== External sources ==
- Gary Finley at Soccerbase
