= Stuart Jones (footballer, born 1984) =

Welsh footballer

Personal information
- Date of birth: 14 March 1984 (age 42)
- Place of birth: Aberystwyth, Wales
- Position: Defender

Youth career
- 2000–2002: Swansea City

Senior career*
Years	Team	Apps	(Gls)
2002–2005	Swansea City	34	(0)
2005–2012	Llanelli	200	(14)
2012–2016	Aberystwyth Town	122	(8)
2016–2019	Bala Town	68	(3)
2019	Aberystwyth Town	18	(0)
2021	Bow Street Reserves	2	(1)

International career^{‡}
2004	Wales U21	1	(0)
2008–20??	Wales Semi-Pro	1	(0)
- * Club domestic league appearances and goals as of 21:59, 4 August 2019 (UTC) ‡ National team caps and goals as of 4 May 2010

Stuart Jones (born 14 March 1984) is a Welsh football coach and former footballer who played as a defender. He was most recently a coach at Cymru Premier club Aberystwyth Town.

== Career ==
A product of the Swansea City youth development system, Jones made his first-team debut on 22 October 2002 in a 2–1 defeat to Stevenage Borough in the Football League Trophy. He made over 30 appearances for the Swans between 2003 and 2005 but moved on at the end of the 2004–05 season. In 2005, he joined Llanelli, becoming the club's first full-time player since the Jock Stein era in the 1950s. At Llanelli, Jones was voted into the Welsh Premier team of the season for the 2007–8, 2008–9 seasons, 2010–11, 2011–12.

Over the next 7 years, Jones made almost 200 appearances for the side and in that time at the club won the League, League Cup and Welsh Cup and qualified for the UEFA Europa League on several occasions. He has also earned caps for both the Wales Under 21s and the Welsh Semi Pro squads, and has been named in the Welsh Premier Team of the Year on no less than 4 occasions. Jones joined Aberystwyth Town in 2012. Stuart was a rock in the Centre of Defence in the 2014/15 as the Black and Greens managed an excellent fourth-placed finish. He received six nominations from rival Managers for last year's WPL Team of the Season. Based in Borth, Jones signed for his local Welsh Premier League club in May 2012, and took on the role of Club Development Officer alongside his playing duties. Since joining Aber in 2012, he has made over 100 appearances in Black and Green, scoring 10+ times, including a vital header at TNS towards the end of the season. Overall, he has made over 300 WPL appearances, scoring 20+ goals. It is telling, and quite remarkable that none of these appearances have been as a substitute.

On 4 August 2019, Jones returned to hometown club Aberystwyth Town.

== Career statistics ==
As of 4 May 2010

Club statistics
Club	Season	League		National Cup		League Cup		Other		Total	
Club	Season	App	Goals	App	Goals	App	Goals	App	Goals	App	Goals
Swansea City	2002–03	6	0	0	0	0	0	1	0	7	0
Swansea City	2003–04	24	0	1	0	1	0	1	0	27	0
Swansea City	2004–05	4	0	0	0	0	0	0	0	4	0
Swansea City	Subtotal	34	0	1	0	1	0	2	0	38	0
Llanelli	2005–06	33	2			3	0	0	0	36	2
Llanelli	2006–07	27	0			9	0	1	0	37	0
Llanelli	2007–08	21	0	3	1	1	0	1	0	26	1
Llanelli	2008–09	33	3	3	1	4	0	2	1	42	5
Llanelli	2009–10	30	3	3	0	3	0	2	1	38	4
Llanelli	Subtotal	144	8	9	2	20	0	6	2	179	12
Total		178	8	10	2	21	0	8	2	217	12

== Honours ==
Bala Town

- Welsh Cup winner: 2017

Individual

- Welsh Premier League Team of the Year: 2007–08, 2008–09, 2010–11, 2011–12, 2013–14
