= Anthony Limbrick =

Australian football coach (born 1983)

Personal information
- Date of birth: 9 April 1983 (age 43)
- Place of birth: Hobart, Tasmania, Australia
- Position: Defender

Youth career
- Riverside Olympic

Senior career*
Years	Team	Apps	(Gls)
- Riverside Olympic
- Bundaberg Waves
- Rochedale Rovers
2005	Northwood	2	(0)
2005–2006	Wingate & Finchley		

Managerial career
- 2017–2018: Woking
- 2019: Grimsby Town (interim)
- 2021–2022: The New Saints
- 2023: Manchester 62
- 2025: Hartlepool United
- 2026–: Loudoun United
- * Club domestic league appearances and goals

Anthony Limbrick (born 9 April 1983) is an Australian professional football manager and former player who is the head coach of USL Championship-side Loudoun United.

As a player, Limbrick played at a semi-professional level for Australian sides Riverside Olympic, Bundaberg Waves and Rochedale Rovers before emigrating to England in 2005 where he featured for non-league sides Northwood and Wingate & Finchley. Since moving into coaching he has worked for Premier League sides Southampton and West Ham United as well as the England under-17s. He was appointed manager of Woking in 2017 before a spell as Ian Holloway's assistant manager at Grimsby Town.

== Club career ==
Born in Hobart, Tasmania, Limbrick later moved to Launceston, attending Riverside High School. During Limbrick's time in Tasmania, he played for Riverside Olympic, before moving to Queensland on mainland Australia, playing for Bundaberg Waves and Rochedale Rovers. Limbrick later played Non-League football in England for Northwood and Wingate & Finchley, before a broken leg ended his playing career.

== Managerial career ==
=== Early coaching roles ===
In 2007, Limbrick became a youth team coach at Boreham Wood. In 2007, he returned to former club Wingate & Finchley as first team coach, leaving in 2010 to join Southampton as a youth coach, working under first team managers Mauricio Pochettino and Ronald Koeman. Limbrick was later part of the coaching staff with the England under-17s and West Ham United's academy.

=== Woking ===
In May 2017, Limbrick was appointed manager of National League club Woking, leading the club to the FA Cup second round, after beating Football League club Bury. In April 2018, after a nine-game winless run, Limbrick was sacked as manager of Woking.

=== Grimsby Town ===
Ahead of the 2018–19 EFL League Two season, Limbrick was appointed assistant manager to Michael Jolley at Grimsby Town. In November 2019, following the departure of Jolley via mutual consent, Limbrick was named interim manager of Grimsby before reverting to assistant following the appointment of Ian Holloway. Limbrick departed Grimsby in September 2020.

=== The New Saints ===
On 2 April 2021, Limbrick was appointed manager of Cymru Premier club The New Saints following the dismissal of Scott Ruscoe. On 11 April 2021, Limbrick took charge of his first Cymru Premier match, which saw The New Saints secure a 1–0 home win over Bala Town. Limbrick saw out the rest of the Cymru Premier season with seven wins, a draw and only one loss to finish second in the table and qualify for the 2021-22 UEFA Europa Conference League first qualifying round.

In the inaugural season of the UEFA Europa Conference League, Limbrick's 2021–22 side cruised through qualifying rounds 1 and 2, beating Glentoran and FK Kauno Žalgiris. However, their momentum quickly shrivelled after a penalty shootout heartbreak in the second leg of the third round against Viktoria Plzeň, despite their impressive first-leg win their European journey came to a sudden end. Following the game, Limbrick explained, "When you play these top teams there's fine margins, we conceded late in both games and the players were dead on their feet by the end because they couldn't have done anymore." Despite the European exit, The New Saints dominated the opening of The 2021–22 Cymru Premier, remaining undefeated after the first seven league fixtures. Following this success in the league, Limbrick was awarded Cymru Premier Manager of the Month.

On 11 March 2022, Limbrick became the first Australian manager to win a top-flight European football league after his side drew 3−3 with Penybont to seal the 2021−22 title. Limbrick's side claimed the Welsh Cup with a 3–2 win over Penybont in the final.

Limbrick was sacked in July 2022, due to The New Saints' disappointing performances in European competitions.

=== Manchester 62 ===
In June 2023, Limbrick was appointed as manager of Gibraltar Football League side Manchester 62. He managed six league games before resigning due to the club's financial issues.

=== Peterborough United ===
In January 2024, Limbrick began working at League One side Peterborough United as the club's Head of Academy Professional Development Phase Coach.

=== Hartlepool United ===
On 7 November 2024, Limbrick was appointed head coach at Hartlepool United as a part of newly appointed manager Lennie Lawrence's coaching staff. On 3 February 2025, Lawrence announced that he had stepped back from his role to allow Limbrick to take over as manager. On 12 June 2025, Limbrick left the club. He was replaced by Simon Grayson on the same day.

=== Loudoun United ===
In January 2026, Limbrick was appointed head coach of USL Championship-side Loudoun United.

== Managerial statistics ==
As of match played 30 May 2026

Managerial record by team and tenure
Team	Nat	From	To	Record					Ref.
Team	Nat	From	To	G	W	D	L	Win %	Ref.
Woking	(England)	6 August 2017	3 April 2018	49	14	11	24	28.57	
Grimsby Town (interim)	(England)	20 November 2019	29 December 2019	9	1	4	4	11.11	
The New Saints	(Wales)	10 April 2021	4 August 2022	61	42	10	9	68.85	
Manchester 62	(Gibraltar)	20 June 2023	15 December 2023	10	6	0	4	60.00	
Hartlepool United	(England)	3 February 2025	12 June 2025	17	5	6	6	29.41	
Loudoun United	(United States)	12 January 2026	Present	13	2	6	5	15.38	
Total				159	70	37	52	44.03	

== Honours ==
=== Manager ===
The New Saints

- Cymru Premier: 2021–22
- Welsh Cup: 2021−22

Individual

- Cymru Premier Manager of the Month: August 2021, January 2022
