= Tony Pennock =

Welsh football manager and former player (born 1971)

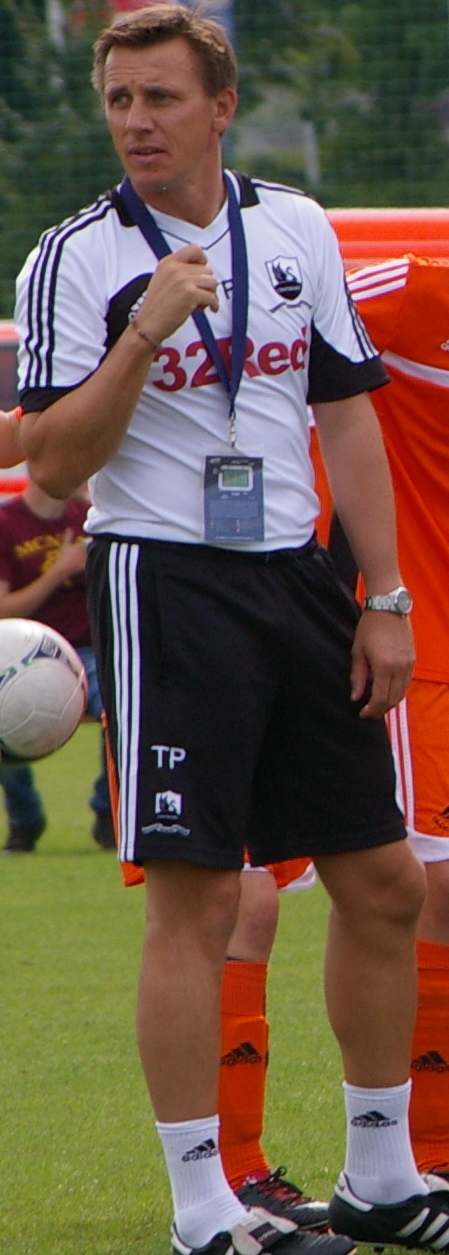

Personal information
- Full name: Anthony Pennock
- Date of birth: 10 April 1971 (age 55)
- Place of birth: Swansea, Wales
- Height: 1.85 m (6 ft 1 in)
- Position: Goalkeeper

Senior career*
Years	Team	Apps	(Gls)
1990–1992	Stockport County	0	(0)
1990–1991	→ Wigan Athletic (loan)	2	(0)
1991–1994	Wigan Athletic	8	(0)
1994–1995	Hereford United	15	(0)
1995–2001	Yeovil Town	236	(1)
2001–2002	Rushden & Diamonds	5	(0)
2002–2003	Farnborough Town	51	(0)
2003–2005	Carmarthen Town	66	(0)
2005–2008	Newport County	30	(0)
Total		419	(1)

Managerial career
- 2003–2008: Wales Semi-Pro
- 2007: Port Talbot Town
- 2017: Aberystwyth Town
- 2022–2026: Haverfordwest County
- * Club domestic league appearances and goals

Anthony Pennock (born 10 April 1971 in Swansea) is a Welsh football coach and former professional footballer who played as a goalkeeper. He was most recently manager of Cymru Premier side Haverfordwest County.

== Personal life ==
Pennock has a son, Alex who plays for Penybont as a goalkeeper. He also has a daughter, Georgia, who works in radiotherapy in the NHS.

== Playing career ==
He started his professional career at Stockport County. Pennock made his senior debut playing for Wigan Athletic, in a 3rd round 1990–91 FA Cup tie against Coventry City. He went on to make 10 league appearances for Wigan before joining Hereford United in their Third Division days.

He added a further 15 league games before spending six years at Yeovil Town. In his second season, 1996–97 Yeovil were promoted back to the Conference from the Diadora Premier League, going on to have several successful FA Cup campaigns, beating several league teams over the next few seasons. In a replay at Huish Park against Cardiff City in January 1999, Pennock made an error which is often shown in sporting bloopers clips, rolling the ball forwards before intending to clear it downfield. Unfortunately, he rolled the ball too far forwards and was tackled by the Cardiff City striker and the ball rebounded into his net; it was the winning goal. Pennock redeemed himself in the second round in December 2000, with a magnificent performance as Yeovil won at Blackpool, a match televised on Sky.

Pennock then played five times in the league for Rushden & Diamonds having signed along with Yeovil teammate Warren Patmore in the summer of 2001 after Yeovil finished second in the Conference to Rushden. He then signed on loan for Farnborough Town in February 2002, before making the move permanent in the 2002 close season and playing at Arsenal in the FA Cup. Pennock was critical of the methods of Farnborough's manager and owner, Graham Westley, and as a result was one of relatively few first choice players that did not leave Farnborough with Westley immediately after the Arsenal game.

After two years with Carmarthen Town, Pennock joined Newport County in October 2005. He broke his leg at the start of the 2006–07 season which ruled him out of matches for the rest of that season. During this period of time he was also goalkeeping coach for Swansea City

In November 2007 Pennock left Port Talbot and returned to Newport County as a player but was released at the end of the 2007–08 season and joined Neath Athletic.

Pennock returned to Port Talbot Town in September 2009 as a player to provide cover following an injury to Lee Kendall, making one appearance before leaving to sign for Aberaman Athletic in February 2010.

== Managerial career ==
Pennock joined Port Talbot Town as manager for the start of the 2007–08 season after guiding the Welsh Semi-pro team to second in the Four Nations Semi-Pro Tournament in May 2007. In July 2008, Pennock stepped down as Wales semi-pro manager after taking up a coaching role at Swansea. He was appointed as the Head of Youth, helping the club's Academy attain Category Two status with the Premier League in his time.

Pennock joined Hull City in 2014, to manage the Tiger's Academy, and was promoted to first team coach in November 2016. On 17 January 2017, with the arrival of Marco Silva, who brought his own backroom staff, the club announced that Pennock had left the club.

On 7 April 2017, Pennock joined Welsh Premier League club Aberystwyth Town as assistant manager but was made permanent first team manager in May 2017 after the departure of Mathew Bishop.

In June 2017, Pennock left his role as Aberystwyth manager after less than a month in charge to return to Hull City as first-team coach.

Following the end of the 2021–22 season, Pennock stepped down from the coaching staff after 8-years with Hull City.

On 1 July 2022, he was appointed as First Team Manager of Cymru Premier side Haverfordwest County AFC on a 2-year deal, with an option for a third.

== Honours ==
- Welsh Premier League Team of the Year: 2004–05
