= Antonio Corbisiero =

English footballer

Personal information
- Full name: Antonio Giovanni Vincenzo Corbisiero
- Date of birth: 17 November 1984 (age 42)
- Place of birth: Exmouth, Devon, England
- Position: Midfielder

Team information
- Current team: Haverfordwest County (interim-manager)

Youth career
- –2002: Swansea City

Senior career*
Years	Team	Apps	(Gls)
2002–2005	Swansea City	5	(0)
2004	→ Newport County (loan)	5	(0)
2005	→ Newport County (loan)	4	(1)
2005	Newport County	8	(2)
2005–2013	Llanelli	216	(15)
2013–2016	Aberystwyth Town	92	(1)
2016–2020	Penrhyncoch	64	(2)
2020	Aberystwyth Town	0	(0)
2023	Penrhyncoch	1	(0)

Managerial career
- 2021–2022: Aberystwyth Town
- 2024–2025: Aberystwyth Town
- 2026–: Haverfordwest County (interim)
- * Club domestic league appearances and goals

Antonio Giovanni Vincenzo Corbisiero (born 17 November 1984) is an English football manager and former footballer who is currently interim-manager of Cymru Premier club Haverfordwest County.

He previously played professionally for Swansea City and semi-professionally for Newport County, Aberystwyth Town, Llanelli and Penrhyncoch.

== Career ==
Born in Exmouth, Devon, Corbisiero, a right-footed midfielder of Irish-Italian parentage, began his career as a trainee with Swansea City, turning professional in August 2002. his league debut came on 30 August 2003 when he was a second-half substitute for Andy Robinson in Swansea's 4–1 win at home to Mansfield Town. He played four more times that season, starting just one game, a 3–2 defeat at home to Hull City, although Corbisiero was replaced by Leyton Maxwell at half-time.

He was an awarded a new one-year contract in June 2004, but failed to appear in the Swansea first team the following season and had two loan spells with Newport County (in December 2004 and April 2005) before being released in May 2005 by Swansea manager Kenny Jackett. He joined subsequently joined Newport County in August 2005, but was released in September 2005 and joined Llanelli the following month.

In January 2013, Llanelli entered financial difficulties and Corbisiero was allowed to join Aberystwyth Town. Corbisiero signed a contract until July 2014. During the summer of 2013, Aberystwyth Town appointed Corbisiero as 'First Team Coach' in addition to his academy coaching duties.

Corbisiero joined Cymru Alliance side Penrhyncoch in 2016.

Corbisiero retired from playing in 2020.

== Coaching career ==
In June 2020, Corbisiero was appointed assistant manager at Aberystwyth Town.

On 21 December 2020, Corbisiero was made interim manager of the club following Gavin Allen's departure, though this was reversed shortly after as Allen's position was reinstated.

On 2 June 2021, Corbisiero was once again appointed manager after Gavin Allen's official departure.

Following the conclusion of the 2021/22 Cymru Premier season and guiding the club to an 8th place finish, on the 12th May 2022 Corbisiero resigned from his role at the club as did his backroom staff; Gari Lewis, Bari Morgan, Stuart Jones and Dave Owen.

On 12 November 2024, Corbisiero returned to Aberystwyth Town as First Team manager following the departure of Anthony Williams. He left the club in May 2025 after the relegation of the club from the Cymru Premier.

== External sources ==
- Welsh Premier League Profile for Antonio Corbisiero
