= Aberystwyth Town F.C. =

Association football club in Wales

Aberystwyth Town
- Full name: Aberystwyth Town Football Club
- Nicknames: Seasiders; Black and Greens
- Founded: 1884; 142 years ago
- Ground: Park Avenue, Aberystwyth
- Capacity: 5,000 (1,500 seated)
- Chairman: Donald Kane
- Manager: Craig Williams
- League: Cymru South
- 2025–26: Cymru South, 6th of 16
- Website: www.atfc.org.uk
Home colours	Away colours

Aberystwyth Town Football Club (Welsh: Clwb Pêl-Droed Tref Aberystwyth) is a Welsh association football club based in Aberystwyth, Ceredigion. The men's first team competes in the Cymru South, the southern section of the second tier of the Welsh football league system.

Founded in 1884, the club was a founder member of the League of Wales in 1992 and remained continuously in the national top flight for 33 seasons before being relegated at the end of the 2024–25 season. The Football Association of Wales subsequently placed the club in the Cymru South for the 2025–26 season.

Aberystwyth won the Welsh Cup in 1900, defeating Druids 3–0 in the final, and have subsequently finished as runners-up in 2009, 2014 and 2018. The club has represented Wales in European competition on three occasions, competing in the UEFA Intertoto Cup in 1999 and 2004 and the UEFA Europa League in 2014–15.

The club has played at Park Avenue since 1907. The club also operates women's, development, academy and youth teams.

== History ==
=== Early history ===
Although Aberystwyth Town Football Club was formally established in 1884, records indicate that an earlier town club existed during the 1870s, with the re-establishment of an Aberystwyth club reported in 1876.

The club's earliest years consisted mainly of friendly matches. Aberystwyth entered league competition in 1896, joining the Welsh League, although the stay lasted only one season before the club returned to playing friendlies. The club also entered the English FA Cup on several occasions during its early history.

Goalkeeper Leigh Richmond Roose, who arrived at Aberystwyth University in 1895, was one of the club's most prominent early players. Roose made 85 appearances for Aberystwyth before going on to play professionally in England and represent Wales.

Aberystwyth achieved their first major success in 1900, when they defeated Druids 3–0 in the Welsh Cup final. Roose kept a clean sheet in the final. The victory made Aberystwyth the first club from west Wales to win the competition.

The success was followed by financial difficulties and the departure of a number of players. Aberystwyth subsequently competed briefly in the Combination before joining the Montgomeryshire and District League in 1904.

Following the establishment of the Welsh National League in 1921, Aberystwyth joined its Central Section and enjoyed considerable success during the 1920s, winning six league titles. Further Mid-Wales League championships followed in 1932–33 and 1949–50. The club also won the Welsh Amateur Cup in 1930–31 and 1932–33.

=== Post-war period ===
Aberystwyth began a long spell in the Welsh League South in 1951, while at different times continuing to field sides in the Mid-Wales League and Cambrian Coast League. The club returned to Mid-Wales competition in 1963.

A number of the club's longest-serving and most prolific players emerged during this period. Bryan Pugh-Jones made 515 first-team appearances between 1960 and 1979 and captained the club for ten years. He later served for approximately 20 years as groundsman at Park Avenue.

Dai Whitney made 564 appearances between 1962 and 1981, scoring 143 goals. His winning header against Hereford United in the Welsh Cup in January 1972 secured one of the most notable cup victories in the club's history.

David "Dias" Williams became the club's record goalscorer, scoring 476 goals in 433 appearances between 1966 and 1983. His records included 62 goals during the 1978–79 season and 11 in a single match against Llandrindod Wells. A stand at Park Avenue was later named in his memory.

=== Success during the 1980s ===
After finishing as league runners-up on several occasions, Aberystwyth won the Mid-Wales League under manager Meirion Appleton in 1983–84 and retained the title in 1984–85.

The championships formed part of one of the club's most successful periods. Aberystwyth won the Central Wales Challenge Cup in 1981–82, 1982–83 and 1984–85, the Mid-Wales League Cup in 1985–86, and the Welsh Intermediate Cup in 1985–86 and 1987–88.

The 1984–85 side completed a Central Wales treble, winning the league, league cup and Central Wales Challenge Cup.

Ken Williams was one of the leading players of the period and made a club-record 642 appearances between 1973 and 1991.

Kevin Morrison joined the club from Newtown in 1984, aged 17, and scored 45 goals in his first season. He eventually scored 396 goals in 489 appearances for Aberystwyth before retiring through injury in 2000.

The club returned to the Welsh League South in 1987 and recorded three successive runners-up finishes before the establishment of a national league.

=== League of Wales and first European qualification ===
Aberystwyth became founder members of the League of Wales in 1992. The club finished third in the inaugural 1992–93 season, which remains its highest national-league placing.

After several more difficult campaigns, a fourth-place finish in 1998–99 secured qualification for European competition for the first time.

Barry Powell succeeded Meirion Appleton during the season and led Aberystwyth into the 1999 UEFA Intertoto Cup. Drawn against Floriana of Malta, Aberystwyth drew 2–2 at Park Avenue before losing the away leg 2–1 to exit 4–3 on aggregate.

The side included Kevin Morrison and Glyndwr "Paddy" Hughes. Hughes, from nearby Bont, spent 17 seasons with the club between 1994 and 2013, making 456 appearances and scoring 130 goals.

European qualification was accompanied by improvements to Park Avenue, including television facilities and additional spectator accommodation. In 2000, a new stand named in memory of David "Dias" Williams was opened by former Wales international John Charles.

=== 2004–2013: Europe, rebuilding and cup success ===
Aberystwyth finished fourth in 2003–04 under player-manager Gary Finley, securing a second UEFA Intertoto Cup campaign. The club drew 0–0 at home against Dinaburg of Latvia before losing the return leg 4–0.

In December 2004, a fire destroyed much of the social club at Park Avenue. A new social and hospitality facility, the John Charles Lounge, opened in 2005.

Under manager Brian Coyne, Aberystwyth reached the 2009 Welsh Cup Final, losing 2–0 to Bangor City at Parc y Scarlets. Paddy Hughes and Geoff Kellaway were among the players to represent the club in the final.

Alan Morgan subsequently led Aberystwyth to fourth place in 2009–10. Kellaway was selected in the Welsh Premier League Team of the Season.

Following the reduction of the Welsh Premier League to 12 clubs, Aberystwyth reached the end-of-season European play-offs in both 2010–11 and 2011–12 but failed to qualify for Europe.

Paddy Hughes left the club at the conclusion of the 2012–13 season, having represented Aberystwyth in two European campaigns and the 2009 Welsh Cup Final.

=== 2013–2018: Cup finals and return to Europe ===
Ian Hughes was appointed manager in May 2013.

During his first season, Aberystwyth scored 72 league goals and reached the 2014 Welsh Cup Final. The club lost 3–2 to The New Saints at the Racecourse Ground, but qualified for the 2014–15 UEFA Europa League as The New Saints had already qualified for the UEFA Champions League.

Aberystwyth were drawn against Derry City in the first qualifying round. Derry won 4–0 at the Brandywell and 5–0 at Park Avenue to progress 9–0 on aggregate.

The club finished fourth in the Welsh Premier League in 2014–15, its best league placing since 1992–93, and subsequently reached the European play-off final before losing to Newtown.

Neville Powell became manager in 2017 and Aberystwyth reached another Welsh Cup Final in his first season. Wins over Cwmamman United, Cardiff Metropolitan University and Carmarthen Town were followed by a semi-final victory over Newtown.

The 2018 final, against Connah's Quay Nomads at Latham Park, ended in a 4–1 defeat.

Geoff Kellaway appeared in each of Aberystwyth's 2009, 2014 and 2018 Welsh Cup Finals. Across three spells between 2003 and 2021, he made 366 appearances and scored 95 goals.

=== 2019–present ===
The 2019–20 campaign was curtailed by the COVID-19 pandemic in Wales, while restrictions also affected the following season. Aberystwyth nevertheless maintained their place in the Cymru Premier.

The club spent much of the early 2020s competing in the lower half of the league. On 2 December 2022, Aberystwyth suffered their heaviest defeat of the national-league era, losing 11–0 to The New Saints.

The 2024–25 season combined a major cup run with relegation from the Cymru Premier. Aberystwyth reached the final of the Nathaniel MG Cup for the first time. The final was played against The New Saints at Latham Park on 28 February 2025, with a goal from Remi Oteh giving The New Saints a 1–0 victory.

Aberystwyth's relegation from the Cymru Premier was confirmed in March 2025, ending 33 consecutive seasons in the national top flight.

The Football Association of Wales subsequently placed Aberystwyth in the Cymru South for 2025–26.

Callum McKenzie was appointed manager in June 2025. In November 2025, McKenzie accepted a full-time academy position with Wolverhampton Wanderers and left Aberystwyth later that month.

Craig Williams was appointed manager on 1 December 2025. Williams had previously played for Aberystwyth and joined the club from Caersws.

Aberystwyth finished sixth in the 2025–26 Cymru South, winning 13, drawing five and losing 12 of their 30 league matches to collect 44 points. Trefelin BGC, Cambrian United and Ammanford secured the three promotion places.

The club consequently began a second Cymru South campaign in 2026–27 under Williams. The squad was substantially reshaped during the close season, with Liam Walsh appointed club captain ahead of the new campaign.

== Stadium ==
Aberystwyth Town have played at Park Avenue since 1907. The ground is situated close to the River Rheidol, Aberystwyth railway station and the coast of Cardigan Bay.

Known for sponsorship purposes as Aberystwyth University Park Avenue Stadium, the ground has a capacity of 5,000, including approximately 1,500 seats.

The principal spectator areas include the Dias Stand, named after record goalscorer David "Dias" Williams; the Rhun Owens Stand, named after a former club secretary; the Railway End; the Shed End; and an area traditionally known as Narks Corner.

The ground's principal social facility is the John Charles Lounge, which opened in 2005 after a fire destroyed much of the previous clubhouse in December 2004.

== Players ==
=== Current squad ===
As of 2 November 2026.

Flags indicate national team as defined under FIFA eligibility rules. Players may hold more than one non-FIFA nationality.

Note: Flags indicate national team as defined under FIFA eligibility rules; some limited exceptions apply. Players may hold more than one non-FIFA nationality.

No.	Pos.	Nation	Player
—	GK	WAL	Luke Evans
—	GK	WAL	Tomos Wyn Evans
—	DF	ENG	Sam Paddock
—	DF	WAL	Jack Rimmer
—	DF	WAL	Richy Ricketts
—	DF	WAL	Dylan Downs
—	DF	ENG	James Smallwood
—	MF	ENG	Leo Thompson
—	MF	WAL	Dillon Browne
—	FW	WAL	Dan Owen
—	FW	WAL	Tom Mason
—	FW	ENG	Aaron Williams

No.	Pos.	Nation	Player
—	MF	ENG	Chris Field
—	DF	WAL	Harry Cottam
—	DF	WAL	Niall Coleridge
—	DF	WAL	Ernie Andrews
—	DF	WAL	Tomos Evans
—	DF	WAL	Liam Walsh (captain)
—	MF	WAL	Ben Davies
—	MF	WAL	Gruff Sedgwick
—	FW	WAL	Rhys Hughes
—	MF	WAL	Tarran Hollinshead
—	FW	WAL	Cameron Allen
—	FW	WAL	Alfie Davies

Liam Walsh was appointed club captain ahead of the 2026–27 Cymru South season.

== Staff ==
As of 2 November 2026.

Position	Name	Nationality
Chairman	Donald Kane	(Scotland) Scottish
Secretary	Thomas Crockett	(Wales) Welsh
Manager	Craig Williams	(Wales) Welsh
Assistant manager	Matthew Bishop	(England) English
Coach	Aneurin Thomas	(Wales) Welsh
Coach	Bryn McGilligan Oliver	(Wales) Welsh
Goalkeeping coach	John Davies	(England) English
Physiotherapist	Ffiona Evans	(Wales) Welsh
Performance coach	Rico Martin	(Wales) Welsh

=== Managerial history ===
Manager	Period
Angus McLean (player-manager)	1951–?
Ron Cullum	1974–1977
Ron Jones	1977–1979
Brian Morris	1979–1980
Chris Brown	1980–1981
Meirion Appleton	1981–1992
Tomi Morgan	1992–September 1994
Meirion Appleton	September 1994–February 1999
Barry Powell	March 1999–May 2001
Frank Gregan	June 2001–November 2001
Gary Finley	November 2001–August 2004
David Burrows	August 2004–November 2005
Brian Coyne	November 2005–September 2009
Christian Edwards (interim)	September–November 2009
Alan Morgan	November 2009–February 2012
Tomi Morgan	29 February 2012–9 May 2013
Ian Hughes	21 May 2013–19 April 2016
Wyn Thomas (interim)	January–April 2016
Matthew Bishop	24 May 2016–21 May 2017
Tony Pennock	21 May–15 June 2017
Neville Powell	12 July 2017–28 March 2018
Seamus Heath	28 March–9 August 2018
Neville Powell	3 October 2018–27 January 2019
Gavin Allen (interim)	27 January–24 March 2019
Matthew Bishop	24 March 2019–15 June 2020
Gavin Allen	15 June 2020–24 May 2021
Antonio Corbisiero	2 June 2021–12 May 2022
Anthony Williams	28 May 2022–8 October 2024
Dave Taylor (interim)	9 October–12 November 2024
Antonio Corbisiero	12 November 2024–1 May 2025
Callum McKenzie	4 June–November 2025
Craig Williams	1 December 2025–present

== Notable former players ==
The following list includes former Aberystwyth players who have played in a fully professional league, represented a senior national team, hold a significant club record, or made a notable long-term contribution to the club.

- Daniel Alfei – former Swansea City player who subsequently played for Yeovil Town.
- Tom Bradshaw – progressed from Aberystwyth to the English Football League and became a senior Wales international.
- Christian Edwards – Wales international who played for clubs including Nottingham Forest, Swansea City and Bristol Rovers.
- Gwion Edwards – progressed to a career in the English Football League.
- Alan Goodall – made more than 300 appearances in the English Football League.
- Jack Edwards – Wales international.
- Jack Garner – capped by Wales in 1896.
- John Hughes – capped twice by Wales and played for Aberystwyth during the 1870s.
- Lee Jenkins – Aberaeron-born defender who began his senior career with Aberystwyth and made his first-team debut aged 16. He subsequently played for Haverfordwest County before joining EFL club Newport County in 2025.
- Geoff Kellaway – made 366 appearances across three spells with the club and appeared in the 2009, 2014 and 2018 Welsh Cup Finals.
- Marc Lloyd Williams – record goalscorer in the Cymru Premier.
- Robert Mills-Roberts – Wales international goalkeeper during the late nineteenth century.
- Grenville Morris – represented Wales and later played for Swindon Town and Nottingham Forest.
- Kevin Morrison – scored 396 goals in 489 appearances for Aberystwyth.
- Conall Murtagh – later played for Wrexham in the Football League.
- Rhys Norrington-Davies – spent time in the Aberystwyth academy and subsequently became a Wales international.
- Owain Jones – former Swansea City player who later represented Aberystwyth.
- Andy Parkinson – played for several Football League clubs and appeared for Tranmere Rovers in the 2000 Football League Cup Final.
- Charlie Parry – Wales international and member of Aberystwyth's 1900 Welsh Cup-winning side.
- Ernest Peake – Wales international who subsequently played for Liverpool.
- Bryan Pugh-Jones – made 515 first-team appearances and captained the club for ten years.
- Leigh Richmond Roose – goalkeeper in the 1900 Welsh Cup-winning side who represented Wales while an Aberystwyth player.
- Alex Samuel – represented Wales at youth level and subsequently played professionally in the English Football League.
- Alhagi Touray Sisay – represented Aberystwyth in 2020 before later playing for Grimsby Town.
- Wyn Thomas – long-serving defender and former Cymru Premier appearance-record holder.
- Dai Whitney – made 564 appearances and scored 143 goals for the club.
- David "Dias" Williams – club record goalscorer with 476 goals in 433 appearances.
- Ken Williams – club record appearance holder with 642 appearances.
- William Roberts Jones – capped by Wales in 1897.

== European record ==
Season	Competition	Round	Opponent	First leg	Second leg	Aggregate
1999	UEFA Intertoto Cup	First round	(Malta) Floriana	2–2	1–2	3–4
2004	UEFA Intertoto Cup	First round	(Latvia) Dinaburg	0–0	0–4	0–4
2014–15	UEFA Europa League	First qualifying round	(Republic of Ireland) Derry City	0–4	0–5	0–9

Aberystwyth Town's score is shown first.

== Honours ==
=== National competitions ===
Welsh Cup

- Winners: 1899–1900
- Runners-up: 2008–09, 2013–14, 2017–18

Welsh League Cup

- Runners-up: 2024–25

Welsh Amateur Cup

- Winners: 1930–31, 1932–33, 1969–70
- Runners-up: 1906–07, 1910–11, 1928–29, 1934–35, 1971–72

Welsh Intermediate Cup

- Winners: 1985–86, 1987–88
- Runners-up: 1988–89

=== League honours ===
League of Wales/Welsh Premier League

- Third place: 1992–93
- Fourth place: 1998–99, 2003–04, 2009–10, 2014–15

Welsh League South

- Runners-up: 1955–56, 1988–89, 1989–90, 1990–91

Welsh League South Division Two

- Champions: 1951–52

Mid-Wales League/Central Wales League

- Champions: 1922–23, 1923–24, 1925–26, 1926–27, 1927–28, 1929–30, 1932–33, 1948–49, 1949–50, 1958–59, 1983–84, 1984–85
- Runners-up: 1930–31, 1938–39, 1947–48, 1950–51, 1965–66, 1967–68, 1968–69, 1975–76, 1979–80, 1980–81, 1985–86, 1986–87

=== Regional cup competitions ===
Mid-Wales League Cup/Central Wales League Cup

- Winners: 1926–27, 1927–28, 1938–39, 1947–48, 1967–68, 1970–71, 1973–74, 1985–86
- Runners-up: 1922–23, 1928–29, 1931–32, 1933–34, 1934–35, 1958–59, 1971–72, 1975–76, 1979–80, 1980–81, 1983–84

Central Wales Challenge Cup

- Winners: 1975–76, 1981–82, 1982–83, 1984–85
- Runners-up: 1970–71, 1973–74, 1985–86

Central Wales FA Floodlight Cup

- Winners: 1997–98, 2003–04, 2005–06

== Records ==
=== Team records ===
- Largest victory: 21–1 v Machynlleth, 1934
- Largest defeat: 1–20 v Caersws, 1962
- Largest League of Wales/Cymru Premier victories: 7–1 v Afan Lido, 28 March 2014; 7–1 v Prestatyn Town, 16 December 2017
- Largest Cymru Premier defeat: 0–11 v The New Saints, 2 December 2022
- Highest national-league finish: Third, 1992–93
- Best Welsh Cup performance: Winners, 1899–1900
- Best Welsh League Cup performance: Runners-up, 2024–25

=== Individual records ===
- Most appearances: Ken Williams – 642
- Second-most appearances: Dai Whitney – 564
- Most goals: David "Dias" Williams – 476
- Most goals in one season: David Williams – 62, 1978–79
- Most goals in one match: David Williams – 11 v Llandrindod Wells

== Women's team ==
Aberystwyth Town operates a women's first team which competes in the Genero Adran Premier - the highest tier of women's domestic football in Wales.
