= List of Cymru Premier champions =

The Cymru Premier champions are the winners of the highest league in Welsh football, which is currently the Cymru Premier, known as the League of Wales prior to the 2002–03 season and the Welsh Premier League prior to the 2019-20 season. Teams in bold are those who won the double of the Cymru Premier League Championship and Welsh Cup, those in italic are those that won the treble of the Cymru Premier, Welsh Cup and Welsh League Cup in that season.

== Champions ==
=== League of Wales (1992–2002) ===
Year	Champions	Runners-up	Third place	Leading goalscorer	Goals
1992–93	Cwmbran Town	Inter Cardiff	Aberystwyth Town	(Wales) Steve Woods (Ebbw Vale)	29
1993–94	Bangor City	Inter Cardiff	Ton Pentre	(Wales) Dave Taylor (Porthmadog)	43
1994–95	Bangor City	Afan Lido	Ton Pentre	(Wales) Frank Mottram (Bangor City)	31
1995–96	Barry Town	Newtown	Conwy United	(England) Ken McKenna (Conwy United)	38
1996–97	**Barry Town**	Inter Cardiff	Ebbw Vale	(Wales) Tony Bird (Barry Town)	42
1997–98	Barry Town^{[1]}	Newtown	Ebbw Vale	(Wales) Eifion Williams (Barry Town)	40
1998–99	Barry Town^{[2]}	**Inter Cardiff**	Cwmbran Town	(Wales) Eifion Williams (Barry Town)	28
1999–2000	Total Network Solutions	Barry Town	Cwmbran Town	(Wales) Chris Summers (Cwmbran Town)	28
2000–01	**Barry Town**	Cwmbran Town	Carmarthen Town	(Wales) Graham Evans (Caersws)	25
2001–02	**Barry Town**	Total Network Solutions	Bangor City	(Wales) Marc Lloyd-Williams (Bangor City)	47

=== Welsh Premier League (2002–2019) ===
Year	Champions	Runners-up	Third place	Leading goalscorer	Goals
2002–03	**Barry Town**	Total Network Solutions	Bangor City	(Wales) Graham Evans (Caersws)	24
2003–04	**Rhyl**	Total Network Solutions	Haverfordwest County	(Wales) Graham Evans (Caersws)^{[4]}	24
2004–05	**Total Network Solutions**	Rhyl	Bangor City	(Wales) Marc Lloyd-Williams (Total Network Solutions)	31
2005–06	Total Network Solutions	Llanelli	**Rhyl**	(Wales) Rhys Griffiths (Port Talbot Town)	28
2006–07	The New Saints^{[2]}	Rhyl	Llanelli	(Wales) Rhys Griffiths (Llanelli)	30
2007–08	Llanelli	The New Saints	Rhyl	(Wales) Rhys Griffiths (Llanelli)	40
2008–09	Rhyl	Llanelli	The New Saints	(Wales) Rhys Griffiths (Llanelli)	31
2009–10	The New Saints	Llanelli	Port Talbot Town	(Wales) Rhys Griffiths (Llanelli)	30
2010–11	Bangor City	The New Saints	Neath	(Wales) Rhys Griffiths (Llanelli)	25
2011–12	**The New Saints**	Bangor City	Neath	(Wales) Rhys Griffiths (Llanelli)	24
2012–13	The New Saints	Airbus UK Broughton	Bangor City	(Wales) Michael Wilde (The New Saints)	25
2013–14	**The New Saints**	Airbus UK Broughton	Carmarthen Town	(Wales) Chris Venables (Aberystwyth Town)	20
2014–15	**The New Saints**	Bala Town	Airbus UK Broughton	(Wales) Chris Venables (Aberystwyth Town)	28
2015–16	**The New Saints**	Bala Town	Llandudno	(Wales) Chris Venables (Bala Town)	20
2016–17	The New Saints	Connah's Quay	**Bala Town**	(England) Jason Oswell (Newtown)	22
2017–18	The New Saints	Bangor City	**Connah's Quay Nomads**	(New Zealand) Greg Draper (The New Saints)	21
2018–19	**The New Saints**	Connah's Quay Nomads	Barry Town United	(New Zealand) Greg Draper (The New Saints)	27

=== Cymru Premier (2019–present) ===
Year	Champions	Runners-up	Third place	Leading goalscorer	Goals
2019–20	Connah's Quay Nomads	The New Saints	Bala Town	(Wales) Chris Venables (Bala Town)	22
2020–21	Connah's Quay Nomads	The New Saints	Bala Town	(Wales) Chris Venables (Bala Town)	24
2021–22	**The New Saints**	Bala Town	Newtown	(Scotland) Declan McManus (The New Saints)	24
2022–23	**The New Saints**	Connah's Quay Nomads	Penybont	(Scotland) Declan McManus (The New Saints)	26
2023–24	The New Saints^{[1]}	**Connah's Quay Nomads**	Bala Town	(England) Brad Young (The New Saints)	22
2024–25	**The New Saints**	Penybont	Haverfordwest County	(Wales) Louis Lloyd (Caernarfon Town)	17
2025–26	The New Saints	Connah's Quay Nomads	Barry Town United	(England) Jordan Williams (The New Saints)	26

Key:

**Welsh Cup winners**
Welsh League Cup winners
**Won both cups**

== Performances by club ==
Seven clubs have been champions. In bold those competing in Cymru Premier as of 2025–26 season.

Club	Winners	Runners-up	Third place	Winning years
**The New Saints**^{[3]}	18	7	1	1999–2000, 2004–05, 2005–06, 2006–07, 2009–10, 2011–12, 2012–13, 2013–14, 2014–15, 2015–16, 2016–17, 2017–18, 2018–19, 2021–22, 2022–23, 2023–24, 2024–25, 2025–26
**Barry Town United**	7	1	2	1995–96, 1996–97, 1997–98, 1998–99, 2000–01, 2001–02, 2002–03
Bangor City	3	2	4	1993–94, 1994–95, 2010–11
**Connah's Quay Nomads**	2	5	1	2019–20, 2020–21
Rhyl	2	2	2	2003–04, 2008–09
**Llanelli**	1	3	1	2007–08
Cwmbran Town	1	1	2	1992–93
**Inter Cardiff**	–	4	–	–
**Bala Town**	–	3	4	–
Airbus UK Broughton	–	2	1	–
Newtown	–	2	1	–
**Penybont**	–	1	1	–
Afan Lido	–	1	–	–
Ton Pentre	–	–	2	–
Ebbw Vale	–	–	2	–
Neath	–	–	2	–
Carmarthen Town	–	–	2	–
**Haverfordwest County**	–	–	2	–
Aberystwyth Town	–	–	1	–
Conwy United	–	–	1	–
Port Talbot Town	–	–	1	–
Llandudno	–	–	1	–

Titles won by club (%)
1. The New Saints – 18 (52.9%)
2. Barry Town United – 7 (20.6%)
3. Bangor City FC – 3 (8.80%)
4. Connah's Quay Nomads – 2 (5.90%)
5. Rhyl FC - 2 (5.90%)
6. Llanelli AFC - 1 (2.90%)
7. Cwmbran Town FC - 1 (2.90%)

== Multiple trophy wins ==
See Double (association football) and Treble (association football)

== See also ==
- Welsh football league system
- Football in Wales

== Notes ==
1. **^{a}** **^{b}** Completed the season unbeaten.
2. **^{a}** **^{b}** Also won the FAW Premier Cup.
3. **^{a}** The New Saints were known as Llansantffraid until 1996 and Total Network Solutions between then and 2006.
4. **^{a}** Graham Evans was awarded the Golden Boot after Andy Moran was tested positive for a banned substance.
