= Cymru Premier Golden Boot =

Welsh association football award

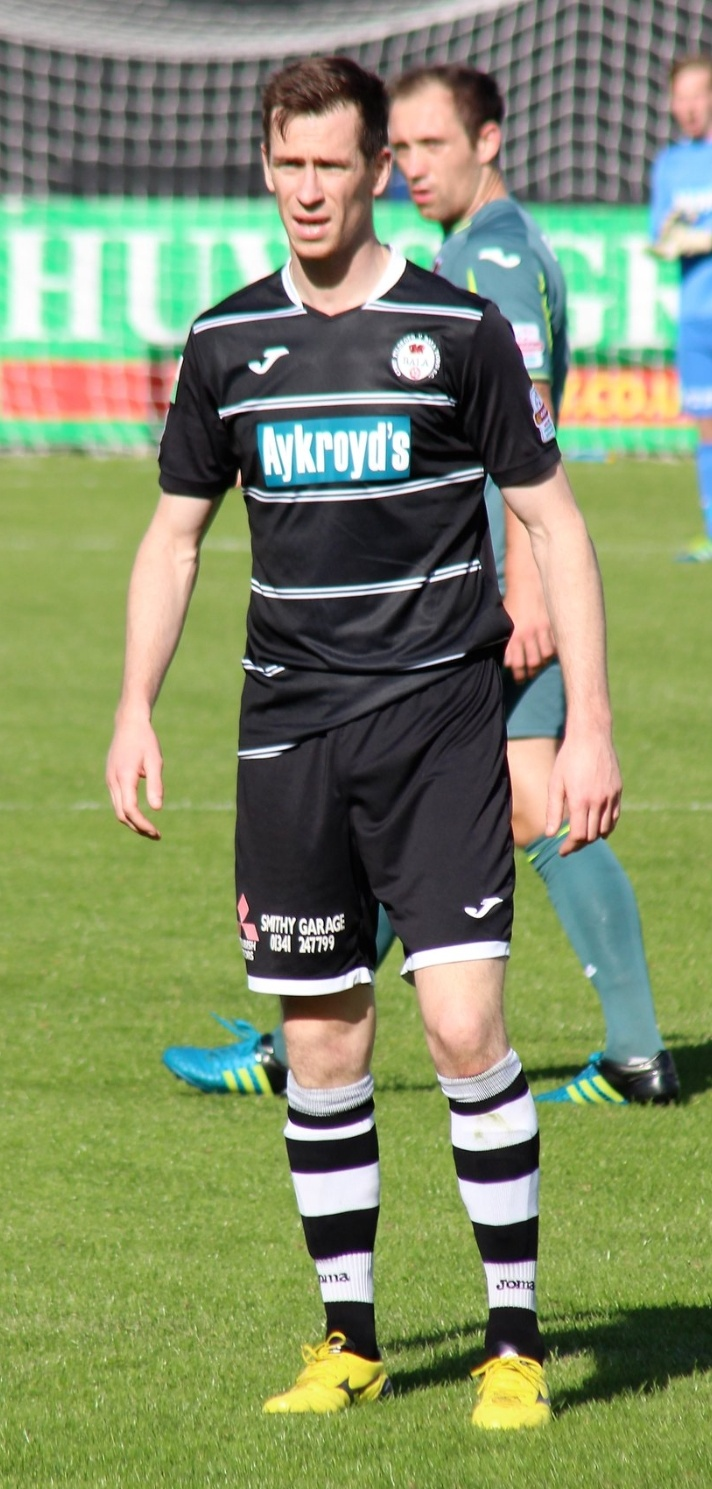
- Chris Venables has won the Golden Boot five times and is the only midfielder to do so.
- Awarded for: The leading goalscorer in a given Cymru Premier season
- Country: Wales
- Presented by: Cymru Premier
- Formerly called: League of Wales Golden Boot; Welsh Premier League Golden Boot
- First award: 1993
- Currently held by: Jordan Williams

Highlights
- Most wins: Rhys Griffiths (7)

The Cymru Premier Golden Boot is an annual association football award presented to the leading goalscorer in the Cymru Premier at the end of each season. The award was created in 1993 for the inaugural season of the competition, which was originally named the League of Wales before being rebranded as the Welsh Premier League in 2002. In 2019, the league was rebranded for a second time, being named the Cymru Premier. Steve Woods of Ebbw Vale, was the first player to win the Golden Boot after scoring 29 times during the first season.

Since then, the award has been handed out at the end of each of the Welsh Premier League's 30 seasons of competition and has been won by 15 individuals as of June 2022. Rhys Griffiths has won the Golden Boot on more occasions than any other player, winning the award in seven consecutive seasons between 2006 and 2012. Chris Venables has won the award on five occasions, Graham Evans on three occasions while Eifion Williams, Marc Lloyd Williams and Greg Draper have two awards each. Marc Lloyd Williams holds the record for the most goals in a single season, scoring 47 during the 2001–02 campaign. The lowest tally of goals to win the award was 16, scored by James Crole of Penybont and Louis Lloyd of Caernarfon Town in the 2024–25 season, who were also the award's first joint winners. The current holder is Jordan Williams who scored 26 goals in the 2025–26 season.

== Winners ==
=== History ===
The League of Wales was founded in 1992, becoming the top tier of Welsh domestic football. The Golden Boot award began alongside the first season of the new division. Steve Woods claimed the award in the inaugural season, scoring 29 times for Ebbw Vale. His tally included six of his side's goals in a 10–0 victory over Briton Ferry Athletic on 6 January 1993, which remained the league's record victory until 1998. In the following season, Porthmadog player David Taylor won the award after scoring 43 goals in 38 appearances. His tally saw him named as the top goalscorer in Europe and he was awarded the European Golden Shoe, outscoring his nearest competitor, Andy Cole in the English Premier League, by nine goals. Two years later, Conwy United's Ken McKenna fell two goals short of the award after scoring 38 goals in a single season; he lost out to Zviad Endeladze of Georgia.

Tony Bird was denied the European Golden Shoe in the 1996–97 season after a new points scoring system was introduced based on UEFA coefficient league rankings. Players in higher rated leagues were awarded more points than those in lower ranked leagues meaning Bird missed out on the award to Ronaldo, who played in Spain's La Liga, despite scoring eight more goals than the Brazilian. Eifion Williams won the Golden Boot in 1997 as he helped Barry Town win the league title without losing a game. The following season, he became the first player to win the award for both a second time and in consecutive years, despite being sold to English Football League side Torquay United with two months of the campaign remaining. Eifion Williams' goals-per-game ratio remains the highest of all time in the competition.

Marc Lloyd Williams set the league record for the most goals scored in a single season during the 2001–02 campaign by scoring 47 goals in 33 appearances. His tally was the highest in Europe; he scored five more goals than European Golden Shoe winner Mário Jardel. Williams repeated the feat three years later with 34 goals during the 2004–05 season. In 2004, the award was won by Andy Moran of Rhyl, however he was stripped of his title and suspended from playing for seven and a half months after he tested positive for the banned steroid nandrolone. The award was subsequently given to the second-highest scorer Graham Evans of Caersws, who became the first player to win the award three times.

Rhys Griffiths won his first Golden Boot in 2006 with Port Talbot Town. He joined Llanelli a year later and went on to win the award for a further six consecutive seasons, becoming the first player to win the award more than three times and the second player, after Williams, to score 200 goals in the Welsh Premier League. Griffiths' last win, during the 2011–12 season, remains the lowest scoring total to claim the award with 19 goals. In 2013, Michael Wilde of The New Saints became the first player other than Griffiths to win the award since 2005. A year later, Chris Venables became the first player not recognised as a forward to claim the Golden Boot. The midfielder netted 24 times in 30 appearances and went on to retain the award for a further two seasons.

In 2018, New Zealand international Greg Draper became the first non-British player to win the Golden Boot after scoring 22 goals during the 2017–18 season. He retained the award the following year with a further 27 goals despite spending more time as a substitute than playing. Venables claimed his fourth title in the 2019–20 season, scoring 22 times in 25 appearances during a campaign which was ended after 26 matches due to the COVID-19 pandemic. He retained the award the following year with a further 24 goals in 31 appearances. Declan McManus became the fourth TNS player to win the award during the 2021–22 season, also scoring 24 times.

=== List ===
Key
Games	The number of Cymru Premier games played by the winner that season (Note: This does not necessarily match the total number of games in a season.)
Rate	The player's goals-to-games ratio for the season
‡	Indicates player also won the European Golden Shoe in the same season
§	Denotes the player's club were Cymru Premier champions in the same season

Cymru Premier Golden Boot winners
Season	Player	Nationality	Club	Goals	Games	Rate	Ref(s)
1992–93	Steve Woods	Wales	Ebbw Vale	29	28	1.03	
1993–94	David Taylor ‡	Wales	Porthmadog	43	38	1.13	
1994–95	Frank Mottram	Wales	Bangor City §	31	36	0.86	
1995–96	Ken McKenna	England	Conwy United	38	35	1.08	
1996–97	Tony Bird	Wales	Barry Town §	42	38	1.10	
1997–98	Eifion Williams	Wales	Barry Town §	40	37	1.08	
1998–99	Eifion Williams	Wales	Barry Town §	28	22	1.27	
1999–2000	Chris Summers	Wales	Cwmbrân Town	28	30	0.93	
2000–01	Graham Evans	Wales	Caersws	25	32	0.78	
2001–02	Marc Lloyd Williams	Wales	Bangor City	47	33	1.42	
2002–03	Graham Evans	Wales	Caersws	24	34	0.70	
2003–04	Graham Evans (Note: Andy Moran of Rhyl initially won the award after scoring 27 goals but was stripped of his title after testing positive for the banned substance nandrolone.)	Wales	Caersws	24	30	0.80	
2004–05	Marc Lloyd Williams	Wales	Total Network Solutions §	34	27	1.25	
2005–06	Rhys Griffiths	Wales	Port Talbot Town	28	32	0.87	
2006–07	Rhys Griffiths	Wales	Llanelli	30	32	0.93	
2007–08	Rhys Griffiths	Wales	Llanelli §	40	31	1.29	
2008–09	Rhys Griffiths	Wales	Llanelli	31	28	1.10	
2009–10	Rhys Griffiths	Wales	Llanelli	30	33	0.90	
2010–11	Rhys Griffiths	Wales	Llanelli	25	28	0.89	
2011–12	Rhys Griffiths	Wales	Llanelli	19	25	0.76	
2012–13	Michael Wilde	England	The New Saints §	25	30	0.83	
2013–14	Chris Venables	Wales	Aberystwyth Town	24	30	0.80	
2014–15	Chris Venables	Wales	Aberystwyth Town	28	27	1.03	
2015–16	Chris Venables	Wales	Aberystwyth Town	20	30	0.66	
2016–17	Jason Oswell	England	Newtown	22	31	0.70	
2017–18	Greg Draper	New Zealand	The New Saints §	22	31	0.70	
2018–19	Greg Draper	New Zealand	The New Saints §	27	29	0.93	
2019–20	Chris Venables	Wales	Bala Town	22	25	0.88	
2020–21	Chris Venables	Wales	Bala Town	24	31	0.77	
2021–22	Declan McManus	Scotland	The New Saints §	24	28	0.86	
2022–23	Declan McManus	Scotland	The New Saints §	26	23	1.13	
2023–24	Brad Young	England	The New Saints §	22	24	1.12	
2024–25	James Crole	Wales	Penybont	16	31	0.52	
2024–25	Louis Lloyd	Wales	Caernarfon Town	16	32	0.5	
2025–26	Jordan Williams	England	The New Saints §	26	31	0.84	

== Awards won by club ==
Club	Total
Total Network Solutions/The New Saints (Note: Total Network Solutions were renamed as The New Saints in 2006.)	8
Llanelli	6
Aberystwyth Town	3
Barry Town	3
Caersws	3
Bala Town	2
Bangor City	2
Caernarfon Town	1
Conwy United	1
Cwmbrân Town	1
Ebbw Vale	1
Newtown	1
Penybont	1
Porthmadog	1
Port Talbot Town	1
