= Steve Evans (footballer, born 1979) =

Welsh football manager and footballer

Personal information
- Full name: Steven James Evans
- Date of birth: 26 February 1979 (age 47)
- Place of birth: Wrexham, Wales
- Height: 6 ft 3 in (1.91 m)
- Position: Defender

Senior career*
| Years | Team | Apps | (Gls) |
| 1999–2006 | The New Saints | 152 | (24) |
| 2001–2002 | → Oswestry Town (loan) | 6 | (1) |
| 2006–2009 | Wrexham | 80 | (7) |
| 2009–2017 | The New Saints | 109 | (13) |
| 2014–2015 | → Connah's Quay Nomads (loan) | 23 | (3) |
| 2021–2022 | Caernarfon Town | 14 | (1) |
| 2022 | Colwyn Bay | 2 | (0) |
| Total | | 385 | (49) |

International career
| 2002–2005 | Wales semi-pro | 9 | (0) |
| 2006–2008 | Wales | 7 | (0) |

Managerial career
- 2017–2021: The New Saints (assistant)
- 2022–2024: Colwyn Bay
- 2024–2026: Flint Town United (assistant)
- 2026: Flint Town United
- 2026–: Bangor City 1876 (assistant)
- * Club domestic league appearances and goals

Steven James Evans (born 26 February 1979) is a Welsh football coach and former professional footballer who is assistant manager of Bangor City.

He is a Welsh former international footballer, having played for his country at semi-pro and full levels. In 2008, he became the first Non-League footballer to be capped by Wales since 1930 – a 76-year gap.

== Club career ==
Much of Evans' playing career saw him playing for The New Saints, over two spells either side of a three-year tenure at hometown club Wrexham. Evans also represented Oswestry Town and Connah's Quay Nomads on loan, in 2001–02 and 2014–15 respectively.

=== Early career ===
He began his career as a trainee at Crewe Alexandra and West Bromwich Albion, but was not offered a professional contract by either club.

=== Total Network Solutions (TNS) ===
He joined League of Wales side Total Network Solutions (TNS) in the summer of 1999, playing in the title-winning side of 2000. He struggled to keep a first team place in the 2001–02 season due to injury, and joined Oswestry Town on loan. After six appearances for Oswestry Town, he returned to TNS and played in the title winning sides of 2005, 2006, and the 2005 Welsh Cup with victory over Carmarthen Town.

He won the Welsh Premier player of the season award for 2004–05. Evans played two games against the then-European champions Liverpool in the summer of 2005. TNS lost both legs 3–0. but he and the rest of the side were praised for their performances against a side containing the likes of England midfielder Steven Gerrard, with Liverpool manager Rafael Benítez saying, "TNS were well organised and they did well. We saw them on videos before the tie and we knew that they would be prepared.". Evans was inducted as a Saints legend in May 2008.

In February 2006, Evans impressed for the Saints in an FAW Premier Cup semi-final against League Two side Wrexham, scoring an equaliser in extra-time to force the game into penalties.

=== Wrexham ===
He joined Wrexham on a two-year deal in June 2006. He had made over 150 league and cup appearances for TNS. Wrexham manager, Denis Smith, said of him, "He can be as good as he wants to be – maybe he could even do a good job for Wales. Steve's good in the air, can pass well and reads the game. He's older and wiser and benefits from experience."

After joining the Racecourse club, he scored on his home debut against Grimsby Town in a 3–0 win. He was sent-off for two bookings in the cross-border derby against rivals Chester City at the Deva Stadium in August 2006; Denis Smith, however, said that he had "...been outstanding for me since coming into the League. He was looking a bit 'leggy', he's finding full-time football a bit different, but he'll learn from this." In spite of that setback, Evans made a seamless transition from the largely semi-professional Welsh Premier League to the fully professional League Two, making 40 league and cup appearances for Wrexham in the 2006–07 season, which was interrupted by a five-match ban during March 2007 for having been sent off three times in the season, and 32 league and cup appearances in the 2007–08 season. Following Wrexham's relegation to the Football Conference at the end of the 2007–08 season, he was out of contract and was considering his options. He signed a new one-year deal with Wrexham in June 2008, with an option for a further twelve months. However, Evans fell out of favour during the season and was released by the club, along with Shaun Pejic, on 2 February.

=== The New Saints ===
Evans then rejoined his former club TNS, now named The New Saints, the next day. In October 2010, he was fined and stripped of the captaincy of the team as part of The New Saints' actions following his arrest in September 2010 on a public order offence. He was also given extensive additional community work for the club, to play an active role in the coaching and development of young players at the club. He assisted the academy and scholarship coaching programmes, and became a player ambassador for the club's Football in the Community programme, working with local schools and junior clubs. In November it was announced that after failing to comply with some of the additional responsibilities set out by the club, his contract had been terminated. After a long running contractual dispute with his former club, in May 2011 an independent Football Association of Wales tribunal ruled in favour of Evans and decided that the player had been unfairly dismissed. The club announced that he had therefore returned to training with the club and was still contracted to the team.

Whilst at the New Saints, he completed his UEFA B Licence coaching qualification. In May 2012, he signed a new contract with the club.

In September 2014, after two serious injuries, he joined Connah's Quay Nomads on loan to get playing time.

=== Caernarfon Town ===
In August 2021, he returned to his playing career, when he signed for Caernarfon Town, at the age of 42.

According to IFFHS, Evans was the third-oldest player (and oldest outfield player) in the world to play a match in the top tier of a national championship in 2021. He was aged 42 years and 298 days in his last Welsh Premier League game in 2021 against Flint Town United on 21 December, only behind goalkeepers Cristian Lucchetti (43) and Mohamed Abdel Monsef (44).

== International career ==
Evans made nine appearances for the Welsh semi-professional side during his first spell at TNS, between the 2002–03 and 2004–05 seasons.

Whilst at Wrexham, he also impressed Wales manager John Toshack, and made his international debut for Wales in a friendly against Liechtenstein in November 2006. He was called up again for Wales' 0–0 draw against Northern Ireland in February 2007 when he was praised by John Toshack, who said, "Steve's in a difficult situation at the bottom of the league with Wrexham, but he's come into our last two games and not put a foot wrong. He handled all the aerial stuff and has shown he can step up a level." Evans would make four more appearances in Welsh colours in 2007: against Republic of Ireland and San Marino in UEFA Euro 2008 qualifying, and friendlies against New Zealand and Bulgaria.

In September 2008, with Wrexham relegated to the Football Conference, Evans became the first non-league player to represent Wales in 76 years, as a second-half substitute in Wales' 2–1 defeat away to Russia in 2010 FIFA World Cup qualification. As of 7 September 2018, he is also the most recent to do so. The Russia match was Evans' most recent international appearance; he has made a total of seven appearances for his country.

== Managerial career ==
=== The New Saints ===
Evans joined The New Saints' first team coaching team in 2017, and was assistant manager at the club until April 2020, when the then manager Scott Roscoe departed.

=== Colwyn Bay ===
In January 2022, he was appointed as manager of Colwyn Bay. He guided the club to the Cymru North title in 2023, and promotion to the Cymru Premier for the first time in the club's history.

On 21 April 2024, Evans was sacked by Colwyn Bay following their relegation from the Cymru Premier.

=== Flint Town ===
The following month, he joined Flint Town United as their assistant manager. In March 2026, he took over as manager, with Lee Fowler moving to a position of Director of Football.

=== Bangor City 1876 ===
In September 2026, he joined Bangor City 1876 as assistant manager to Huw Griffiths.

== Career statistics ==
=== International ===
As of 09:24, 11 October 2018 (UTC)

Appearances and goals by national team and year
| National team | Year | Apps | Goals |
|---|---|---|---|
| Wales | 2006 | 1 | 0 |
| Wales | 2007 | 5 | 0 |
| Wales | 2008 | 1 | 0 |
| Total | | 7 | 0 |

== Honours ==
- Welsh Premier League: Winners medal 2011–12 with The New Saints
- Welsh Cup Winners medal 2011–12 with The New Saints

Individual

- Welsh Premier League Player of the Season: 2004–05
- Welsh Premier League Team of the Year: 2003–04, 2004–05, 2005–06, 2009–10 2011–12
