= 2025–26 Cymru Premier =

Cymru Premier Uwch Gynghrair Cymru
- Season: 2025–26
- Dates: 8 August 2025 – 17 May 2026
- Champions: The New Saints
- Relegated: Bala Town; Llanelli Town
- UEFA Champions League: The New Saints
- UEFA Conference League: Caernarfon Town; Connah's Quay Nomads; Penybont
- Matches: 192
- Goals: 556 (2.9 per match)
- Top goalscorer: Jordan Williams (26 goals)
- Biggest home win: The New Saints 6–0 Llanelli Town (13 September 2026); The New Saints 6–0 Penybont (7 February 2026); Haverfordwest County 6–0 Llanelli Town (18 April 2026)
- Biggest away win: Llanelli Town 0–5 Flint Town United (6 September 2025); Haverfordwest County 0–5 Bala Town (3 April 2026)
- Highest scoring: Colwyn Bay 5–4 Penybont (29 November 2025)
- Longest winning run: 10 – The New Saints (6 September 2025–7 November 2025)
- Longest unbeaten run: 17 – Connah's Quay Nomads (27 September 2025–21 February 2026)
- Longest winless run: 19 – Llanelli Town (4 October 2026–28 March 2026)
- Longest losing run: 7 – Llanelli Town (29 November 2025–13 February 2026)
- Highest attendance: 2,357 – Colwyn Bay 0–2 Caernarfon Town (3 April 2026)
- Lowest attendance: 65 – Llanelli Town 1–2 Connah's Quay Nomads (29 November 2025)
- All statistics correct as of 10 August 2025.

The 2025–26 Cymru Premier (Welsh: Uwch Gynghrair Cymru 2025–26; known as the JD Cymru Premier for sponsorship reasons) was the 34th season of the Cymru Premier (formerly known as the Welsh Premier League), the highest football league within Wales since its establishment in 1992. This was the final season of the competition to utilise a 12 team format, and the final to not use VAR (video assistant referee), in advance of its introduction for 2026–27.

The New Saints were league champions - their 18th title and the fifth in row.

== Teams ==
The league consisted of twelve teams; the top ten teams from the previous season, one team promoted from the Cymru North, and one team promoted from the Cymru South. The New Saints entered the season as defending champions (for the fourth consecutive season). This was the final season to consist of twelve teams, with the league set to expand to sixteen teams from 2026 to 2027.

=== Team changes ===
The following teams changed division since the 2024–25 season.

▲ Promoted to Cymru Premier	▼ Relegated from Cymru Premier
Colwyn Bay; Llanelli Town	Newtown; Aberystwyth Town

The promoted teams were the 2024–25 Cymru North champions Colwyn Bay (returning to the top flight after a single-season absence), and the 2024–25 Cymru South champions Llanelli Town (returning to the top flight for the first time since 2018–19). They replaced the 2024–25 Cymru Premier bottom two teams Newtown and Aberystwyth Town (both relegated from the Cymru Premier for the first time in their histories).

=== Stadia and locations ===
Locations of teams in the 2025–26 Cymru Premier.

Team	Location	Stadium	Capacity	2024–25 season
Bala Town	Bala	Maes Tegid	3,000	6th in Cymru Premier
Barry Town United	Barry	Jenner Park	2,650	7th in Cymru Premier
Briton Ferry Llansawel	Briton Ferry	Old Road	2,300	10th in Cymru Premier
Caernarfon Town	Caernarfon	The Oval	3,000	4th in Cymru Premier
Cardiff Metropolitan University	Cyncoed	Cyncoed Campus	1,620	5th in Cymru Premier
Colwyn Bay^{↑}	Old Colwyn	Llanelian Road	3,000	1st in Cymru North
Connah's Quay Nomads	Connah's Quay	Cae-y-Castell, at Flint (Note: Due to the tenancy problems with the owners of the Deeside Stadium, Connah's Quay Nomads will play their home matches at Cae-y-Castell in Flint.)	3,000	8th in Cymru Premier
Flint Town United	Flint	Cae-y-Castell	3,000	9th in Cymru Premier
Haverfordwest County	Haverfordwest	Bridge Meadow	2,100	3rd in Cymru Premier
Llanelli Town^{↑}	Llanelli	Stebonheath Park	3,700	1st in Cymru South
Penybont	Bridgend	Bryntirion Park	3,000	2nd in Cymru Premier
(England) The New Saints	(England) Oswestry	Park Hall	2,034	1st in Cymru Premier

^{↑}	Promoted from the Cymru North and Cymru South

=== Personnel and kits ===
Team	Head coach	Captain	Kit manufacturer	Front shirt sponsor
Bala Town	(England national football team) Steve Fisher	(England national football team) Nathan Burke	(Italy) Macron	Aykroyd's
Barry Town United	(Wales national football team) Andy Legg	(Wales national football team) Callum Sainty	(Italy) Macron	RIM Motors
Briton Ferry Llansawel	(Wales national football team) Andy Dyer	(Wales national football team) Alex Gammond	(Italy) Macron	Woodpecker Garden Buildings
Caernarfon Town	(Wales national football team) Richard Davies	(Wales national football team) Darren Thomas	(England) Surridge Sport	Williams Timber Solutions
Cardiff Metropolitan University	(Wales national football team) Ryan Jenkins	(Wales national football team) CJ Craven	(United States) Nike	Nuffield Health
Colwyn Bay	(England national football team) Michael Wilde	(Wales national football team) Sam Hart	(England) Hope + Glory	KHS
Connah's Quay Nomads	(Republic of Ireland national football team) John Disney	(England national football team) Chris Marriott	(Germany) Adidas	Castle Green Homes
Flint Town United	(Wales national football team) Steve Evans	(Wales national football team) Harry Owen	(Italy) Macron	Essity
Haverfordwest County	(Wales national football team) Tony Pennock	(Wales national football team) Dylan Rees	(Wales) Tor Sports	DragonBet
Llanelli Town	(Wales national football team) Terry Boyle	(Wales national football team) Josef Hopkins	(Italy) Macron	Red Town Taverns
Penybont	(Wales national football team) Rhys Griffiths	(Wales national football team) Kane Owen	(Italy) Macron	Nathaniel Cars
The New Saints	(England national football team) Craig Harrison	(England national football team) Daniel Redmond	(Italy) Macron	SiFi Networks

=== Managerial changes ===
==== Pre-season ====
Team	Outgoing manager	Manner	Date of vacancy	Replaced by	Date of arrival
Connah's Quay Nomads	(England) Billy Paynter	Sacked	13 April 2025	(Republic of Ireland) John Disney	25 May 2025
Bala Town	(England) Colin Caton	Resigned	3 June 2025	(England) Steve Fisher	10 June 2025

==== During the season ====
Team	Outgoing manager	Manner	Date of vacancy	Position in table		Replaced by	Date of appointment
Team	Outgoing manager	Manner	Date of vacancy	Round	Position	Replaced by	Date of appointment
Llanelli Town	Lee John	Sacked	9 January 2026	21	12th	Terry Boyle	13 January 2026
Barry Town	Steve Jenkins	Changed role	1 February 2026	23	6th	Andy Legg	1 February 2026
Flint Town United	Lee Fowler	Changed role	19 March 2026	29	9th	Steve Evans	19 March 2026

== Regular season ==
=== League table ===
Pos	Team	Pld	W	D	L	GF	GA	GD	Pts	Qualification
1	The New Saints	22	17	2	3	59	19	+40	53	Qualification for the Championship Conference
2	Connah's Quay Nomads	22	14	5	3	48	25	+23	47	Qualification for the Championship Conference
3	Penybont	22	11	5	6	36	31	+5	38	Qualification for the Championship Conference
4	Caernarfon Town	22	9	7	6	44	32	+12	34	Qualification for the Championship Conference
5	Barry Town United	22	7	9	6	33	25	+8	30	Qualification for the Championship Conference
6	Colwyn Bay	22	8	6	8	29	25	+4	30	Qualification for the Championship Conference
7	Cardiff Metropolitan University	22	6	10	6	33	36	−3	28	Qualification for the Play-Off Conference
8	Briton Ferry Llansawel	22	6	7	9	32	40	−8	25	Qualification for the Play-Off Conference
9	Haverfordwest County	22	6	6	10	30	39	−9	24	Qualification for the Play-Off Conference
10	Bala Town	22	6	5	11	19	30	−11	23	Qualification for the Play-Off Conference
11	Flint Town United	22	5	6	11	34	48	−14	21	Qualification for the Play-Off Conference
12	Llanelli Town	22	2	2	18	12	59	−47	8	Qualification for the Play-Off Conference

Source: Cymru Premier
Rules for classification: 1) Points; 2) Goal difference; 3) Goals scored; 4) Head-to-head goal difference; 5) Head-to-head goals scored; 6) Head-to-head away goals scored; 7) Matches won; 8) Away matches won.

=== Results ===
Home \ Away	BAL	BAR	BFL	CFT	CMU	CBY	CQN	FTU	HAV	LLT	PEN	TNS
Bala Town	—	0–0	2–2	0–1	2–2	1–0	1–3	1–1	0–2	1–0	0–0	0–2
Barry Town United	4–0	—	0–1	2–2	1–0	1–1	0–0	0–0	4–0	5–1	2–3	0–0
Briton Ferry Llansawel	2–0	2–1	—	2–5	1–1	0–2	0–3	2–2	0–1	1–2	0–0	0–2
Caernarfon Town	2–0	3–1	4–1	—	0–3	1–2	2–2	1–1	2–2	6–1	1–2	1–3
Cardiff Metropolitan University	2–0	1–1	2–2	2–2	—	1–4	0–3	4–1	0–0	2–1	0–4	1–3
Colwyn Bay	0–1	1–4	2–2	1–0	0–0	—	1–1	1–2	3–0	3–1	5–4	1–1
Connah's Quay Nomads	1–3	3–1	4–2	1–2	1–1	2–1	—	3–2	3–3	3–0	4–0	3–1
Flint Town United	0–4	0–0	2–1	2–5	4–2	0–1	0–2	—	2–2	4–0	3–4	0–3
Haverfordwest County	2–0	2–3	2–3	1–1	2–2	1–0	1–3	3–1	—	3–0	0–1	2–3
Llanelli Town	0–1	0–2	2–4	1–1	1–3	0–0	1–2	0–5	1–0	—	0–1	0–4
Penybont	2–1	1–1	1–1	0–2	1–1	1–0	0–1	5–0	2–1	2–0	—	0–2
The New Saints	2–1	4–0	0–3	2–0	2–3	1–0	3–0	4–2	5–0	6–0	6–2	—

Source: Cymru Premier
Legend: Blue = home team win; Yellow = draw; Red = away team win.
For upcoming matches, an "a" indicates there is an article about the rivalry between the two participants.

== Championship Conference ==
The top six teams from the regular season entered the Championship Conference, playing every other team in the group for the third and fourth time (once at home and once away). Results from the regular season were carried over into this round.

=== League table ===
Pos	Team	Pld	W	D	L	GF	GA	GD	Pts	Qualification
1	The New Saints (C)	32	26	2	4	81	25	+56	80	Qualification for the Champions League first qualifying round
2	Connah's Quay Nomads	32	16	10	6	61	38	+23	58	Qualification for the Conference League first qualifying round
3	Barry Town United	32	12	10	10	43	33	+10	46	Qualification for the Conference League first qualifying round play-off
4	Caernarfon Town	32	12	9	11	56	47	+9	45	Qualification for the Conference League first qualifying round (Note: Caernarfon Town qualified for the Conference League first qualifying round as the 2025–26 Welsh Cup winners.)
5	Colwyn Bay	32	12	9	11	41	37	+4	45	Qualification for the Conference League first qualifying round play-off
6	Penybont (O)	32	11	8	13	39	49	−10	41	Qualification for the Conference League first qualifying round play-off

Source: Cymru Premier
Rules for classification: 1) Points; 2) Goal difference; 3) Goals scored; 4) Head-to-head goal difference; 5) Head-to-head goals scored; 6) Head-to-head away goals scored; 7) Matches won; 8) Away matches won.
(C) Champions; (O) Play-off winners

=== Results ===
Home \ Away	BAR	CFT	CBY	CQN	PEN	TNS
Barry Town United	—	2–1	0–1	1–0	1–0	0–1
Caernarfon Town	0–2	—	3–0	2–4	2–0	0–4
Colwyn Bay	3–1	0–2	—	2–2	3–1	0–2
Connah's Quay Nomads	1–1	1–1	1–1	—	2–1	1–2
Penybont	0–2	0–0	0–0	0–0	—	1–2
The New Saints	1–0	2–1	0–2	2–1	6–0	—

Source: Cymru Premier
Legend: Blue = home team win; Yellow = draw; Red = away team win.
For upcoming matches, an "a" indicates there is an article about the rivalry between the two participants.

== Play-Off Conference ==
The bottom six teams from the regular season entered the Play-Off Conference, playing every other team in the group for the third and fourth time (once at home and once away). Results from the regular season were carried over into this round.

=== League table ===
Pos	Team	Pld	W	D	L	GF	GA	GD	Pts	Qualification or relegation
7	Haverfordwest County	32	14	6	12	48	43	+5	48	Qualification for the Conference League first qualifying round play-off
8	Briton Ferry Llansawel	32	12	9	11	46	47	−1	45	
9	Cardiff Metropolitan University	32	8	14	10	43	51	−8	38	
10	Flint Town United	32	8	11	13	48	59	−11	35	
11	Bala Town (R)	32	8	8	16	33	45	−12	32	Relegation to the Cymru North or Cymru South
12	Llanelli Town (R)	32	3	4	25	17	82	−65	13	Relegation to the Cymru North or Cymru South

Source: Cymru Premier
Rules for classification: 1) Points; 2) Goal difference; 3) Goals scored; 4) Head-to-head goal difference; 5) Head-to-head goals scored; 6) Head-to-head away goals scored; 7) Matches won; 8) Away matches won.
(R) Relegated

=== Results ===
Home \ Away	BAL	BFL	CMU	FTU	HAV	LLT
Bala Town	—	1–2	1–1	3–4	1–0	0–0
Briton Ferry Llansawel	2–1	—	3–1	0–0	0–2	3–1
Cardiff Metropolitan University	2–1	0–2	—	2–2	0–2	1–1
Flint Town United	1–1	0–0	1–1	—	0–1	1–2
Haverfordwest County	3–0	1–0	1–0	1–3	—	6–0
Llanelli Town	0–5	0–2	1–2	0–2	0–1	—

Source: Cymru Premier
Legend: Blue = home team win; Yellow = draw; Red = away team win.
For upcoming matches, an "a" indicates there is an article about the rivalry between the two participants.

== Conference League play-off ==
Teams placed 3rd–7th qualified for one-off play-off matches, with the winners earning the third spot in the 2026–27 UEFA Conference League first qualifying round; the higher-placed team per game received home advantage. Since the 2025–26 Welsh Cup winners (Caernarfon Town) finished in the top seven (4th), a spot was vacated.

=== Bracket ===
Semifinals
3	Barry Town United	1 (1)
7	Haverfordwest County	1 (3)
5	Colwyn Bay	0 (3)
6	Penybont	0 (5)

Finals
6	Penybont	2
7	Haverfordwest County	0

=== Semi-finals ===
25 April 2026	Colwyn Bay (5th)	0–0 (3–5 p)	Penybont (6th)	Old Colwyn
12:45				Stadium: Llanelian Road; Referee: Bryn Markham-Jones
	Penalties
	Williams (penalty scored); Hughes (penalty scored); Davies (penalty missed); Sirrell (penalty scored)		(penalty scored) Venables; (penalty scored) Wood; (penalty scored) Pritchard; (penalty scored) Daley; (penalty scored) Green

26 April 2026	Barry Town United (3rd)	1–1 (1–3 p)	Haverfordwest County (7th)	Barry
17:00	Hulbert 3'		Walters 70'	Stadium: Jenner Park; Referee: Tom Owen
	Penalties
	Patten (penalty missed); Margetson (penalty missed); Davies (penalty scored); Sainty (penalty missed)		(penalty scored) Ahmun; (penalty scored) Rees; (penalty scored) Abbruzzese

=== Final ===
2 May 2026	Penybont (6th)	2–0	Haverfordwest County (7th)	Bridgend
17:25	Venables 10'; Davies 64'			Stadium: DragonBet Stadium; Referee: John Jones

== Season statistics ==
=== Top scorers ===
Rank	Player	Club	Goals
1	(England) Jordan Williams	The New Saints	24
2	(Wales) Rhys Hughes	Connah's Quay Nomads	14
2	(Northern Ireland) Ryan Brobbel	The New Saints	14
2	(Wales) Ben Ahmun	Haverfordwest County	14
5	(Northern Ireland) Harry Franklin	Connah's Quay Nomads	13
5	(Wales) Jordan Davies	Colwyn Bay	13

=== Hat-trick ===
As of 21 March 2026

Player	For	Against	Result	Date
(Wales) Adam Davies	Caernarfon Town	Llanelli Town	6–1 (H)	16 August 2025
(Wales) Noah Daley	Penybont	Barry Town United	2–3 (A)	22 August 2025
(England) Elliott Reeves	Flint Town United	Llanelli Town	0–5 (A)	6 September 2025
(England) Jordan Williams	The New Saints	Haverfordwest County	5–0 (A)	6 September 2025
(Wales) James Crole	Penybont	Cardiff Metropolitan University	0–4 (A)	23 September 2025
(England) Harry Franklin	Connah's Quay Nomads	Briton Ferry Llansawel	0–3 (A)	11 October 2025
(England) Elliott Reeves	Flint Town United	Llanelli Town	4–0 (H)	11 October 2025
(England) Jordan Williams	The New Saints	Penybont	6–2 (H)	11 October 2025
(Wales) Jordan Davies	Colwyn Bay	Penybont	5–4 (H)	29 November 2025
(Northern Ireland) Rory Holden	The New Saints	Penybont	6–0 (H)	7 February 2026
(Wales) Dan Hawkins	Haverfordwest County	Llanelli Town	6–0 (H)	19 April 2026

Notes

(H) – Home team
(A) – Away team

=== Clean sheets ===
Rank	Player	Club	Clean sheets
1	(Wales) Nathan Shepperd	The New Saints	16
2	(Wales) George Ratcliffe	Barry Town United	13
3	(England) Joel Torrance	Bala Town	10
4	(Wales) Ifan Knott	Haverfordwest County	8
4	(England) Will Fuller	Briton Ferry Llansawel	8
4	(Wales) Kit Margetson	Connah's Quay Nomads	8
4	(England) Alex Brown	Colwyn Bay	8

=== Discipline ===
==== Player ====
- Most yellow cards: 12
  - (Wales) Joseph Lloyd (Llanelli Town)
- Most red cards: 2
  - (Wales) Mitchell Bates (Briton Ferry Llansawel)
  - (Wales) Harry Owen (Flint Town United)

==== Club ====
- Most yellow cards: 72
  - Connah's Quay Nomads
- Fewest yellow cards: 38
  - Bala Town
- Most red cards: 5
  - Flint Town United
  - Penybont
- Fewest red cards: 1
  - Caernarfon Town
  - Llanelli
  - The New Saints

=== Monthly awards ===
As of 12 May 2026

Month	Player of the Month		Manager of the Month	
Month	Manager	Club	Player	Club
July/ August	Tom Walters	Briton Ferry Llansawel	Richard Davies	Caernarfon Town
September	Gabe Kircough	Penybont	Craig Harrison	The New Saints
October	Rhys Hughes	Connah's Quay Nomads	Michael Wilde	Colwyn Bay
November	Jordan Williams	The New Saints	John Disney	Connah's Quay Nomads
December	Harry Franklin	Connah's Quay Nomads	John Disney	Connah's Quay Nomads
January	Rhys Hughes	Connah's Quay Nomads	Craig Harrison	The New Saints
February	Ben Margetson	Barry Town United	Andy Legg	Barry Town United
March	Cameron Ferguson	Bala Town	Michael Wilde	Colwyn Bay
April	Matty Jones	Caernarfon Town	Richard Davies	Caernarfon Town

== See also ==
- 2025–26 Cymru North
- 2025–26 Cymru South
- 2025–26 Welsh Cup
- 2025–26 Welsh League Cup
