= 2009–10 Welsh Premier League =

Edition of the soccer championship

Welsh Premier League
- Season: 2009–10
- Champions: The New Saints (5th title)
- Relegated: Rhyl; Connah's Quay; CPD Porthmadog; Welshpool Town; Caersws; Cefn Druids
- Champions League: The New Saints
- Europa League: Llanelli; Port Talbot Town; Bangor City (via dom. cup)
- Matches: 306
- Goals: 861 (2.81 per match)
- Top goalscorer: Rhys Griffiths (30)
- Biggest home win: Pt. Talbot 7–0 Cefn Druids
- Biggest away win: Welshpool 0–5 Prestatyn; Cefn Dr. 0–5 Prestatyn
- Highest scoring: Bangor 6–3 Bala

The 2009–10 Welsh Premier League was the 18th season of the Welsh Premier League since its establishment in 1992 as the League of Wales. It began on 14 August 2009 and ended on 24 April 2010. Rhyl were the defending champions.

== Teams ==
Bala Town were promoted from the Cymru Alliance and played in the top division for the first time in their history. Caersws survived relegation for a second straight year after ENTO Aberaman Athletic failed in their appeal to get a domestic licence after their floodlights were not up to the Welsh FA's expectations. None of the remaining top two teams in the Welsh Football League First Division could meet ground regulations.

The league was reduced to a size of 12 teams after this season following a unanimous decision by the Premier League clubs in June 2009. As a result of this, six clubs were relegated. The number of relegated teams could also have been seven or eight (the maximum), depending on whether any Cymru Alliance / Welsh Football League First Division clubs were eligible to be promoted to the 2010–11 Premier League. None of them were, so six teams were relegated, including last season's champions Rhyl.

=== Team summaries ===
Location of clubs in Welsh Premier League 2009–10

| Team | Ground | Capacity |
|---|---|---|
| Aberystwyth Town | Park Avenue | 5,500 |
| Airbus UK Broughton | The Airfield | 2,100 |
| Bala Town | Maes Tegid | 3,000 |
| Bangor City | Farrar Road Stadium | 1,500 |
| Caersws | Recreation Ground | 3,500 |
| Carmarthen Town | Richmond Park | 3,000 |
| Elements Cefn Druids | Plaskynaston Lane | 2,000 |
| Gap Connah's Quay | Deeside Stadium | 5,500 |
| Haverfordwest County | Bridge Meadow Stadium | 2,000 |
| Llanelli AFC | Stebonheath Park | 3,700 |
| Neath | The Gnoll | 7,000 |
| Newtown AFC | Latham Park | 5,000 |
| Port Talbot Town | Victoria Road | 2,500 |
| Porthmadog | Y Traeth | 2,000 |
| Prestatyn Town | Bastion Road | 2,500 |
| Rhyl | Belle Vue | 3,800 |
| The New Saints | Park Hall | 2,000 |
| Technogroup Welshpool Town | Maes y Dre Recreation Ground | 3,000 |

=== Managerial changes ===
| Team | Outgoing manager | Manner of departure | Date of vacancy | Incoming manager | Date of appointment |
|---|---|---|---|---|---|
| Gap Connah's Quay | (Wales) Steve O'Shaughnessy | Sacked | Pre-Season | (England) Mark McGregor | Pre-Season |
| Caersws | (Wales) David Taylor | Mutual Consent | Pre-Season | (Wales) Mickey Evans | Pre-Season |
| Aberystwyth Town | (Scotland) Brian Coyne | Resigned | 26 September 2009 | (Wales) Alan Morgan | 4 November 2009 |

== League table ==
| Pos | Team | Pld | W | D | L | GF | GA | GD | Pts | Qualification or relegation |
|---|---|---|---|---|---|---|---|---|---|---|
| 1 | The New Saints (C) | 34 | 25 | 7 | 2 | 69 | 13 | +56 | 82 | Qualification for Champions League second qualifying round |
| 2 | Llanelli | 34 | 25 | 5 | 4 | 79 | 26 | +53 | 80 | Qualification for Europa League first qualifying round |
| 3 | Port Talbot Town | 34 | 19 | 8 | 7 | 56 | 23 | +33 | 65 | Qualification for Europa League first qualifying round |
| 4 | Aberystwyth Town | 34 | 19 | 7 | 8 | 54 | 41 | +13 | 64 | |
| 5 | Bangor City | 34 | 19 | 6 | 9 | 75 | 45 | +30 | 63 | Qualification for Europa League second qualifying round (Note: Bangor City are the winners of the 2009–10 Welsh Cup competition and have qualified for the second qualifying round of the UEFA Europa League.) |
| 6 | Rhyl (R) | 34 | 18 | 8 | 8 | 74 | 43 | +31 | 62 | Relegation to Cymru Alliance (Note: Rhyl were denied the domestic licence for competing in the 2010–11 Welsh Premier League and were therefore relegated to the second tier. Welsh Premier League aspirants Llangefni Town (Cymru Alliance) and Afan Lido (Welsh Football League First Division) were also denied licenses meaning that no team from the second tier was promoted. Since these three teams failed to obtain licenses, the best three teams originally to be relegated, with all three obtaining their licenses, were spared from relegation (Bala Town, Haverfordwest County and Newtown AFC).) |
| 7 | Airbus UK Broughton | 34 | 12 | 13 | 9 | 49 | 37 | +12 | 49 | |
| 8 | Prestatyn Town | 34 | 12 | 12 | 10 | 53 | 53 | 0 | 48 | |
| 9 | Neath | 34 | 12 | 11 | 11 | 41 | 38 | +3 | 47 | |
| 10 | Carmarthen Town | 34 | 12 | 9 | 13 | 45 | 38 | +7 | 45 | |
| 11 | Bala Town | 34 | 12 | 9 | 13 | 39 | 47 | −8 | 45 | Spared from relegation |
| 12 | Haverfordwest County | 34 | 11 | 11 | 12 | 43 | 47 | −4 | 44 | Spared from relegation |
| 13 | Newtown | 34 | 10 | 11 | 13 | 54 | 57 | −3 | 41 | Spared from relegation |
| 14 | Gap Connah's Quay Nomads (R) | 34 | 11 | 8 | 15 | 31 | 42 | −11 | 41 | Relegation to Cymru Alliance |
| 15 | CPD Porthmadog (R) | 34 | 6 | 6 | 22 | 23 | 66 | −43 | 24 | Relegation to Cymru Alliance |
| 16 | Welshpool Town (R) | 34 | 6 | 5 | 23 | 30 | 70 | −40 | 23 | Relegation to Cymru Alliance |
| 17 | Caersws FC (R) | 34 | 3 | 4 | 27 | 26 | 94 | −68 | 13 | Relegation to Cymru Alliance |
| 18 | Elements Cefn Druids (R) | 34 | 1 | 6 | 27 | 16 | 77 | −61 | 9 | Relegation to Cymru Alliance |

Source: BBC
Rules for classification: 1) points; 2) goal difference; 3) number of goals scored.
(C) Champions; (R) Relegated

== Results ==
| Home \ Away | ABE | AIR | BAL | BAN | CAE | CMR | CDR | GCQ | POR | HAV | LLA | NEA | NEW | PTA | PRE | RHL | TNS | WEL |
|---|---|---|---|---|---|---|---|---|---|---|---|---|---|---|---|---|---|---|
| Aberystwyth Town | | 0–3 | 1–0 | 2–1 | 3–2 | 1–2 | 4–1 | 1–2 | 1–0 | 2–1 | 1–1 | 1–1 | 2–1 | 2–1 | 2–3 | 2–2 | 1–3 | 1–1 |
| Airbus UK Broughton | 2–0 | | 0–1 | 1–5 | 3–0 | 2–2 | 1–1 | 4–0 | 1–2 | 3–1 | 0–1 | 1–1 | 2–0 | 0–0 | 2–0 | 2–2 | 0–0 | 1–2 |
| Bala Town | 1–1 | 1–2 | | 2–1 | 2–0 | 1–3 | 1–0 | 2–2 | 0–0 | 1–1 | 0–1 | 1–0 | 1–1 | 1–1 | 2–4 | 0–4 | 0–1 | 2–1 |
| Bangor City | 0–1 | 3–0 | 6–3 | | 7–1 | 3–2 | 3–1 | 0–0 | 2–0 | 3–2 | 2–3 | 3–1 | 0–0 | 1–1 | 4–0 | 3–1 | 0–1 | 3–2 |
| Caersws FC | 0–4 | 0–4 | 1–3 | 1–3 | | 0–3 | 1–0 | 1–0 | 1–2 | 0–2 | 0–2 | 0–1 | 1–1 | 1–2 | 1–5 | 2–2 | 0–3 | 3–0 |
| Carmarthen Town | 0–0 | 0–1 | 2–1 | 2–2 | 1–0 | | 4–0 | 1–0 | 1–3 | 2–2 | 1–2 | 0–1 | 1–2 | 3–1 | 1–2 | 0–1 | 1–2 | 1–1 |
| Cefn Druids | 0–3 | 1–1 | 1–2 | 0–1 | 1–1 | 0–1 | | 0–1 | 1–0 | 1–2 | 2–5 | 0–1 | 0–2 | 0–1 | 0–5 | 1–1 | 0–0 | 0–1 |
| Connah's Quay | 0–3 | 0–1 | 0–1 | 0–1 | 5–0 | 0–0 | 3–1 | | 3–0 | 1–1 | 1–0 | 2–0 | 3–1 | 0–3 | 1–1 | 0–2 | 1–0 | 0–0 |
| CPD Porthmadog | 0–1 | 0–1 | 0–2 | 0–2 | 1–1 | 1–4 | 1–0 | 0–1 | | 0–0 | 0–4 | 1–4 | 1–1 | 0–1 | 2–0 | 0–2 | 1–1 | 2–3 |
| Haverfordwest County | 0–1 | 1–1 | 1–1 | 2–2 | 3–1 | 2–1 | 1–0 | 1–0 | 2–0 | | 0–1 | 1–2 | 1–2 | 1–1 | 3–3 | 2–4 | 0–0 | 1–0 |
| Llanelli | 4–0 | 2–2 | 2–0 | 3–2 | 7–1 | 1–0 | 4–0 | 5–0 | 5–0 | 1–1 | | 2–1 | 3–2 | 1–0 | 4–1 | 3–1 | 0–2 | 2–1 |
| Neath | 1–3 | 0–0 | 2–1 | 0–1 | 5–3 | 1–1 | 1–1 | 1–1 | 3–2 | 1–2 | 2–1 | | 1–1 | 0–2 | 1–1 | 2–0 | 0–1 | 4–0 |
| Newtown | 1–2 | 3–3 | 0–1 | 2–5 | 4–1 | 0–0 | 4–2 | 0–0 | 1–3 | 2–1 | 0–2 | 1–0 | | 2–2 | 3–2 | 2–4 | 0–2 | 4–1 |
| Port Talbot Town | 1–2 | 2–1 | 0–0 | 2–1 | 4–0 | 0–1 | 7–0 | 1–0 | 5–0 | 1–0 | 0–0 | 2–0 | 2–1 | | 1–1 | 2–1 | 2–0 | 3–0 |
| Prestatyn Town | 0–2 | 2–2 | 2–1 | 1–1 | 1–0 | 0–0 | 2–0 | 3–2 | 1–1 | 3–0 | 1–5 | 0–0 | 1–1 | 0–3 | | 0–0 | 0–1 | 2–1 |
| Rhyl | 1–1 | 2–1 | 5–2 | 5–1 | 3–1 | 2–1 | 6–0 | 4–1 | 4–0 | 1–2 | 0–0 | 0–1 | 4–2 | 2–0 | 1–1 | | 1–2 | 4–1 |
| The New Saints | 4–0 | 2–1 | 0–0 | 2–1 | 4–0 | 2–0 | 4–0 | 3–0 | 5–0 | 4–0 | 1–0 | 2–2 | 2–2 | 1–0 | 5–0 | 4–0 | | 4–0 |
| Welshpool Town | 1–3 | 0–0 | 1–2 | 1–2 | 3–1 | 1–3 | 2–1 | 0–1 | 2–0 | 1–3 | 1–2 | 0–0 | 1–5 | 0–2 | 0–5 | 1–2 | 0–1 | |

Source: Welsh Premiership Football League
Legend: Blue = home team win; Yellow = draw; Red = away team win.

== Top scorers ==
Source: welsh-premier.com

| Rank | Scorer | Club | Goals |
|---|---|---|---|
| 1 | (Wales) Rhys Griffiths | Llanelli AFC | 30 |
| 2 | (Wales) Jamie Reed | Bangor City | 24 |
| 3 | (Scotland) Chris Sharp | The New Saints | 23 |
| 4 | (Wales) Matthew Williams | Rhyl | 20 |
| 5 | (Wales) Luke Bowen | Aberystwyth Town | 17 |
| 6 | (Wales) Marc Lloyd-Williams | Airbus UK Broughton | 16 |
| 6 | (England) Martin Rose | Port Talbot Town | 16 |
| 8 | (England) Mark Connolly | Rhyl | 15 |
| 8 | (England) Lee Hunt | Bangor City | 15 |
| 10 | (Wales) Jack Christopher | Haverfordwest County | 14 |
| 10 | (England) Andy Moran | Prestatyn Town | 14 |
| 10 | (Wales) Craig Stiens | Neath | 14 |

== Awards ==
=== Monthly awards ===
| Month | Manager of the Month | | Player of the Month | |
| Month | Manager | Club | Player | Club |
|---|---|---|---|---|
| September | (England) Greg Strong | Rhyl | (Wales) Marc Lloyd-Williams | Airbus UK Broughton |
| October | (Wales) Andrew Dyer | Neath | (Wales) Lee Surman | Port Talbot Town |
| November | (England) Andy Cale | The New Saints | (England) Paul Smith | Bangor City |
| December | (England) Neville Powell | Bangor City | (Wales) Steve Evans | The New Saints |
| January | (Wales) Colin Caton | Bala Town | (Wales) Luke Sherbon | Aberystwyth Town |
| February | (Wales) Andy Legg | Llanelli | (Wales) Ricky Evans | Bala Town |
| March | (Wales) Alan Morgan | Aberystwyth Town | (England) Jamie Reed | Bangor City |

=== Annual awards ===
==== Player of the season ====
- Winner:

Liam McCreesh (Port Talbot Town)

- Nominated:

Steve Evans (The New Saints), Martin Rose (Port Talbot Town)

==== Young player of the season ====
- Winner:

Craig Jones (The New Saints)

- Nominated:

Scott Barrow (Port Talbot Town), Jamie Reed (Bangor City)

==== Manager of the season ====
- Winner:

Neville Powell (Bangor City)

- Nominated:

Andy Cale (The New Saints), Mark Jones (Port Talbot Town)

==== Team of the Season ====
| Nat. | Position | Name | Club |
|---|---|---|---|
| (Wales) | GK | Lee Kendall | Port Talbot Town |
| (England) | RB | Danny Holmes | The New Saints |
| (Wales) | CB | Steve Evans | The New Saints |
| (Wales) | CB | Michael Johnston | Bangor City |
| (Wales) | LB | Scott Barrow | Port Talbot Town |
| (Wales) | RM | Craig Jones | The New Saints |
| (Wales) | CM | Scott Ruscoe | The New Saints |
| (Wales) | CM | Liam McCreesh | Port Talbot Town |
| (England) | LM | Geoff Kellaway | Aberystwyth Town |
| (England) | ST | Martin Rose | Port Talbot Town |
| (Wales) | ST | Rhys Griffiths | Llanelli |

== Welsh clubs in Europe 2009–10 ==
=== UEFA Champions League ===
After winning the league in 2008/09 Rhyl represented the league in the premier football competition, they started in the second qualifying round with a trick tie with Serbian club Partizan Belgrade. They were beaten 4–0 at home in the first leg, and hammered 8–0 in Serbia in the second leg, thus ending their participation in Europe for the season.

=== UEFA Europa League ===
The New Saints and Llanelli started in the first qualifying round of the competition. TNS were drawn against Fram from Iceland and Llanelli were handed a tie with Motherwell from Scotland. In a good first leg for both sides, Llanelli produced the shock of the round with a 1–0 away win against Motherwell, giving them a wonderful chance of progression. TNS also had a good chance after a respectable 2–1 defeat in Iceland.

The second legs were disappointing however, as even though TNS took an early lead which would have earned them progression, Fram turned the game around and won 2–1, thus knocking out TNS from European competition for another season. Llanelli were also disappointed, losing 3–0 at home to Motherwell which put them out as well.

Bangor City were the only Welsh side in European competition when they started their Europa League campaign in the second qualifying round against FC Honka from Finland. They had hope of progression and this was compounded by a positive 2–0 defeat in Finland, but they lost the home leg 1–0, which knocked them out and ended Wales' participation in European competition for 2009.

=== UEFA ranking ===
The Welsh league picked a disappointing 0.250 for their participation in European competition in 2009, the only points coming from Llanelli's away win against Motherwell.

The league was ranked 46th out of 53 leagues in Europe by UEFA after the 2009–10 season.

- 44 Albania
- 45 Armenia
- 46 Wales
- 47 Montenegro
- 48 Faroe Islands
  - Full list
