= James Crole =

Welsh footballer

Personal information
- Full name: James William Thomas Crole
- Date of birth: 22 February 2004 (age 22)
- Place of birth: Bridgend, Wales
- Position: Striker

Team information
- Current team: Newport County
- Number: 11

Youth career
- Newport County
- Cardiff City

Senior career*
Years	Team	Apps	(Gls)
2022–2024	Cardiff City	0	(0)
2023	→ Torquay United (loan)	2	(0)
2024	→ Queen's Park (loan)	1	(0)
2024–2026	Penybont	48	(27)
2026–	Newport County	22	(1)

International career^{‡}
2022	Wales U18	2	(1)
2022	Wales U19	3	(2)
- * Club domestic league appearances and goals as of 14:51, 21 November 2026 (UTC) ‡ National team caps and goals as of 19:04, 25 February 2024 (UTC)

James William Thomas Crole (born 22 February 2004) is a Welsh footballer who plays as a striker for EFL League Two club Newport County. He is a Wales youth international.

== Club career ==
=== Cardiff City ===
Crole joined the Cardiff City academy from the Newport County academy at under-14 level. He signed his first professional contract with Cardiiff City for two years in June 2022.

In January 2023 Crole joined National League club Torquay United on loan for the remainder of the 2022-23 season.

On 27 February 2023, Crole made his senior debut for Cardiff City in the EFL Cup third round 5–2 defeat to Blackburn Rovers.

On 1 January 2024 Crole joined Scottish Championship club Queen's Park on loan for the remainder of the 2023-24 season. He made his debut for Queen's Park on 3 February 2024 in the 1-0 win against Inverness.

Crole departed Cardiff upon the expiry of his contract at the end of the 2023–24 season.

=== Penybont ===
In July 2024, Crole joined Cymru Premier club Penybont. Crole was joint winner of the Cymru Premier Golden Boot award for the 2024–25 season, scoring 16 alongside Caernarfon Town's Louis Lloyd.

=== Newport County ===
In January 2026, Crole joined EFL League Two club Newport County on a two-and-a-half year deal for an undisclosed fee. He made his debut for the side on 17 January 2026 in a 3-2 league defeat to Gillingham. Crole scored his first Newport goal in the EFL League Two 2-1 win against Barnet on 14 March 2026.

== International ==
Crole was called up to the Wales under-19 squad in September 2022 for the 2023 UEFA European Under-19 Championship qualification matches against Hungary, Republic of Ireland and Gibraltar. He featured in all three matches, scoring two goals against Gibraltar.

== Career statistics ==
As of match played 21 November 2026

Appearances and goals by club, season and competition
Club	Season	League			National cup		League cup		Continental		Other		Total	
Club	Season	Division	Apps	Goals	Apps	Goals	Apps	Goals	Apps	Goals	Apps	Goals	Apps	Goals
Cardiff City	2022–23	EFL Championship	0	0	0	0	0	0	–		0	0	0	0
Cardiff City	2023–24	EFL Championship	0	0	0	0	1	0	–		1 (Note: Appearance for Cardiff City U21s in Welsh League Cup)	0	2	0
Cardiff City	Total		0	0	0	0	1	0	0	0	1	0	2	0
Torquay United (loan)	2022–23	National League	2	0	0	0	–		–		0	0	2	0
Queen's Park (loan)	2023–24	Scottish Championship	1	0	0	0	0	0	–		0	0	1	0
Penybont	2024–25	Cymru Premier	31	16	0	0	1	1	–		0	0	32	17
Penybont	2025–26	Cymru Premier	17	11	2	3	2	4	2 (Note: Appearances in UEFA Conference League)	0	0	0	23	18
Penybont	Total		48	27	2	3	3	5	2	0	0	0	55	35
Newport County	2025–26	EFL League Two	20	1	0	0	0	0	–		0	0	20	1
Newport County	2026–27	EFL League Two	2	0	1	0	0	0	–		1	1	4	1
Career total			73	28	3	3	4	5	2	0	2	1	84	37

== Honours ==
Individual

- Cymru Premier Golden Boot: 2024–25
