= Daniel Jefferies =

Welsh footballer

Dan Jefferies
Personal information
- Full name: Daniel Rhys Jefferies
- Date of birth: 30 January 1999 (age 27)
- Place of birth: Bridgend, Wales
- Height: 1.88 m (6 ft 2 in)
- Position: Centre-back

Team information
- Current team: Penybont
- Number: 17

Youth career
- –2017: Swansea City
- 2017–2018: Colchester United
- 2018: Dundee

Senior career*
Years	Team	Apps	(Gls)
2016–2017	Swansea City	0	(0)
2017–2018	Colchester United	0	(0)
2018–2019	Dundee	2	(0)
2018–2019	→ Partick Thistle (loan)	4	(0)
2019–2025	Penybont	143	(6)
2025–2026	Briton Ferry	8	(0)
2026–	Penybont	8	(0)

International career
2014	Wales U15	3	(0)
2014	Wales U16	3	(1)
2015–2016	Wales U17	4	(0)
- * Club domestic league appearances and goals as of 15:19, 5 November 2026 (UTC)

Daniel Rhys Jefferies (born 30 January 1999) is a Welsh footballer who plays as a centre-back for Cymru Premier side Penybont

Jefferies is a product of the Swansea City Academy. He left the club in 2017 to join Colchester United. He joined Dundee in January 2018 and during his time there had a loan spell with Partick Thistle.

He has represented Wales at under-15, under-16 and under-17 level.

== Club career ==
Born in Bridgend, Wales, Jefferies attended Coleg Cymunedol Y Dderwen in Tondu, and later Cwmtawe Community School in Pontardawe while playing for the Swansea City Academy.

Jefferies made 14 appearances for the Swansea under-18 team during the 2016–17 season. He appeared on trial for Colchester United's under-18 and under-23s in early 2017. Colchester confirmed the signing of Jefferies from Swansea on 28 July 2017.

On 31 January 2018, he left Colchester and signed for Scottish Premiership side Dundee after appearing for the club on trial. He made his senior debut on 5 May 2018, against Hamilton Academical.

On 31 August 2018, Jefferies joined Scottish Championship club Partick Thistle on loan.

At the end of the 2018–19 season, Jefferies was released by Dundee.

In May 2026 it was announced that he would re-join Penybont.

== International career ==
Jefferies has played for Wales at under-15, under-16, and under-17 level.

He was a member of the Victory Shield-winning under-16 side in 2014.

== Career statistics ==
As of 20 June 2019

Appearances and goals by club, season and competition
Club	Season	League			National Cup		League Cup		Other		Total	
Club	Season	Division	Apps	Goals	Apps	Goals	Apps	Goals	Apps	Goals	Apps	Goals
Dundee	2017–18	Scottish Premiership	2	0	0	0	0	0	0	0	2	0
Dundee	2018–19	Scottish Premiership	0	0	0	0	0	0	2 (Note: Appearances for Dundee under-21s in the Scottish Challenge Cup in which age-restricted sides from the Scottish Premiership clubs compete against senior clubs)	1	2	1
Dundee	Total		2	0	0	0	0	0	2	1	4	1
Partick Thistle (loan)	2018–19	Scottish Championship	4	0	0	0	0	0	0	0	4	0
Penybont	2019–20	Cymru Premier	23	1	2	0	2	0	0	0	27	1
Career total			29	0	0	0	2	0	2	1	35	2

== Honours ==
Wales U16

- 2014 Victory Shield winner
