= Louis Lloyd =

Welsh footballer (born 2003)

Personal information
- Date of birth: 15 October 2003 (age 23)
- Position: Forward

Team information
- Current team: Stenhousemuir (on loan from St Johnstone)

Youth career
- Llandudno
- Wrexham
- Connah's Quay Nomads

Senior career*
Years	Team	Apps	(Gls)
2020–2022	Shrewsbury Town	0	(0)
2022–2023	Wrexham	0	(0)
2023–2025	Caernarfon Town	64	(25)
2025–	St Johnstone	5	(0)
2026–	→ Stenhousemuir (loan)	0	(0)
- * Club domestic league appearances and goals as of 13 April 2026

Louis Lloyd (born 15 October 2003) is a Welsh professional footballer who plays as a forward for Stenhousemuir on loan from St Johnstone.

== Career ==
Lloyd was first called up to a Shrewsbury Town matchday squad on 19 September 2020, remaining unused in a 2–1 home loss to Northampton Town in EFL League One. He made his debut on 10 November in a 4–3 win at Crewe Alexandra in the EFL Trophy group stage, as a last-minute substitute for hat-trick scorer Shilow Tracey.

On 30 November 2022, Lloyd returned to Wrexham, where he spent part of his youth career, following a successful trial. He was released by Wrexham at the end of the 2022–23 season.

On 10 June 2023, Lloyd signed for Caernarfon Town. Lloyd was joint winner of the Cymru Premier Golden Boot award for the 2024–25 season, scoring 16 goals alongside Penybont's James Crole.

In July 2025, he signed for St Johnstone.

In September 2026 he joined Stenhousemuir on loan.

== Career statistics ==
As of match played 28 March 2026

Appearances and goals by club, season and competition
Club	Season	League			National cup (Note: Includes Welsh Cup, Scottish Cup)		League cup (Note: Includes Welsh League Cup)		Europe		Other		Total	
Club	Season	Division	Apps	Goals	Apps	Goals	Apps	Goals	Apps	Goals	Apps	Goals	Apps	Goals
Shrewsbury Town	2020–21	League One	0	0	0	0	0	0	—		2 (Note: Appearances in EFL Trophy)	0	2	0
Shrewsbury Town	2021–22	League One	0	0	0	0	0	0	—		1	1	1	1
Shrewsbury Town	Total		0	0	0	0	0	0	0	0	3	1	3	1
Wrexham	2022–23	National League	0	0	0	0	0	0	—		0	0	0	0
Caernarfon Town	2023–24	Cymru Premier	32	9	1	0	0	0	—		2 (Note: Appearances in Cymru Premier European Playoffs)	1	35	10
Caernarfon Town	2024–25	Cymru Premier	32	16	1	0	2	0	4 (Note: Appearances in UEFA Conference League)	0	3	5	42	21
Caernarfon Town	Total		64	25	2	0	2	0	4	0	5	6	77	31
St Johnstone	2025–26	Scottish Championship	5	0	1	0	0	0	—		1 (Note: Appearances in Scottish Challenge Cup)	1	7	1
Career total			69	25	3	0	2	0	4	0	9	8	87	33

== Honours ==
St Johnstone

- Scottish Championship: 2025–26

Individual

- Cymru Premier Golden Boot: 2023–24
