= Jordan Williams (footballer, born 1992) =

English footballer (born 1992)

Personal information
- Full name: Jordan Lee Raymond Williams
- Date of birth: 13 December 1992 (age 33)
- Place of birth: Whiston, England
- Height: 1.81 m (5 ft 11 in)
- Position: Winger

Team information
- Current team: The New Saints
- Number: 17

Youth career
- Penlake Juniors
- Ashton Athletic

Senior career*
Years	Team	Apps	(Gls)
- Ashton Athletic
2012	Clitheroe		
2012–2015	Burscough		
2015–2016	Northwich Victoria		
2016–2017	Barrow	61	(16)
2017–2019	Rochdale	30	(2)
2018	→ Lincoln City (loan)	11	(0)
2019–2020	AFC Fylde	32	(9)
2020–2021	Stockport County	17	(0)
2021–	The New Saints	144	(67)

International career
2016	England C	1	(0)
- * Club domestic league appearances and goals as of 11:05, 9 November 2026 (UTC)

Jordan Lee Raymond Williams (born 13 December 1992) is an English professional footballer who plays for Cymru Premier side The New Saints as a winger.

== Club career ==
Born in Whiston, Williams grew up supporting Liverpool and played for the youth teams of Penlake Juniors and Ashton Athletic. He graduated to the reserves and first team at Ashton, and then followed the manager to Clitheroe, in May 2012. He departed from the club in November 2012 for Burscough who he played for whilst studying for a teaching degree at nearby Edge Hill University. He moved to Northwich Victoria in summer 2015 where he helped the club progress to the second round of the 2015–16 FA Cup, where over the ten-game run he scored six goals.

In January 2016 he signed for Barrow, before signing for League One club Rochdale in June 2017. He moved on loan to Lincoln City in January 2018. Williams was cup-tied for Lincoln's win in the 2018 EFL Trophy final.

He was released by Rochdale at the end of the 2018–19 season. On 31 May 2019, Williams agreed to join National League side AFC Fylde on a two-year contract following the expiration of his contract with Rochdale.

On 14 August 2020, Williams signed a two-year contract with for Stockport County for an undisclosed fee.

In June 2021, he signed for Cymru Premier side, The New Saints. He scored seventeen goals in 41 games for the club during the 2021–22 season including scoring twice in a 3–2 victory in the final of the Welsh Cup.

During the 2025–26 season, Williams scored 28 goals in 40 games, finishing the season as the Cymru Premier Golden Boot winner, being named in the Cymru Premier team of the season, and being awarded the league's player of the season.

== International career ==
Williams was capped by the England C team during his time at Barrow, winning his only cap in 2016.

== Career statistics ==
As of match played 13 November 2026

Club	Season	League			National cup (Note: Includes FA Cup, Welsh Cup)		League cup (Note: Includes EFL Cup, Welsh League Cup)		Europe		Other		Total	
Club	Season	Division	Apps	Goals	Apps	Goals	Apps	Goals	Apps	Goals	Apps	Goals	Apps	Goals
Barrow	2015–16	National League	20	5	0	0	–		–		–		20	5
Barrow	2016–17	National League	41	11	5	1	–		–		2 (Note: Appearances in FA Trophy)	2	48	14
Barrow	Total		61	16	5	1	–		–		2	2	68	19
Rochdale	2017–18	League One	11	0	1	0	2	0	–		5 (Note: Appearances in EFL Trophy)	0	19	0
Rochdale	2018–19	League One	19	2	2	0	0	0	–		3	1	24	3
Rochdale	Total		30	2	3	0	2	0	–		8	1	43	3
Lincoln City (loan)	2017–18	League Two	11	0	–		–		–		–		11	0
AFC Fylde	2019–20	National League	32	9	4	3	–		–		3	3	39	15
Stockport County	2020–21	National League	17	0	3	0	–		–		2	0	22	0
The New Saints	2021–22	Cymru Premier	31	15	3	2	0	0	6 (Note: Appearances in UEFA Conference League)	1	–		40	18
The New Saints	2022–23	Cymru Premier	8	0	1	1	1	0	4 (Note: Two appearances in UEFA Champions League, two appearances in UEFA Conference League)	0	–		14	1
The New Saints	2023–24	Cymru Premier	30	11	4	1	0	0	4 (Note: Two appearances in UEFA Champions League, two appearances in UEFA Conference League)	0	3 (Note: Appearances in Scottish Challenge Cup)	0	41	12
The New Saints	2024–25	Cymru Premier	29	10	4	3	2	0	11 (Note: Four appearances in UEFA Champions League, two appearances in UEFA Europa League, five appearances and one goal in UEFA Conference League)	1	–		46	14
The New Saints	2025–26	Cymru Premier	31	26	1	0	3	1	4 (Note: Two appearances and one goal in UEFA Champions League, two appearances in UEFA Conference League)	1	–		40	28
The New Saints	2026–27	Cymru Premier	15	5	2	1	0	0	1 (Note: One appearance in UEFA Champions League)	0	–		18	6
The New Saints	Total		144	67	15	8	6	1	30	3	3	0	198	79
Career total			291	95	28	12	8	1	30	3	18	6	377	117

== Honours ==
The New Saints

- Cymru Premier: – 2021–22, 2022–23, 2023–24, 2024–25, 2025–26
- Welsh Cup: – 2021–22, 2022–23, 2024–25
- Welsh League Cup: – 2023–24, 2024–25

Individual

- Cymru Premier Golden Boot: – 2025–26
- Cymru Premier Player of the Season: – 2025–26
- Cymru Premier Team of the Season: – 2025–26
- Cymru Premier Player of the Month: December 2021, November 2025
