= Tony Bird (footballer, born 1974) =

Welsh footballer (born 1974)

Personal information
- Date of birth: 1 September 1974 (age 52)
- Place of birth: Cardiff, Wales
- Height: 5 ft 10 in (1.78 m)
- Positions: Striker; midfielder

Senior career*
Years	Team	Apps	(Gls)
1992–1996	Cardiff City	75	(13)
1996–1997	Barry Town	54	(51)
1997–2000	Swansea City	86	(18)
1999–2000	→ Merthyr Tydfil (loan)		
2000–2002	Kidderminster Harriers	51	(3)
2002–2004	St. Patrick's Athletic		(23)
2004–2005	Drogheda United	10	(0)
2005	Carmarthen Town	0	(0)
2005	Cardiff Grange Quinns	1	(0)
2005–2006	Bath City	33	(8)
2006–2007	Haverfordwest County	5	(0)

International career
	Wales U21	8	
- * Club domestic league appearances and goals

Anthony Bird (born 1 September 1974) is a Welsh former professional footballer. A striker, he made over 200 appearances in the Football League, scoring 34 goals and represented Wales at under-21 level. He began his career at his home town club Cardiff City but was released by the club in 1996. He joined Welsh Premier League side Barry Town where he developed a reputation as a prolific striker, finishing the 1996–97 season as the league's top scorer and the highest scoring player in any European league with 42 goals. However, he missed out on the European Golden Shoe award due to the newly introduced points system, which awarded the prize to Barcelona forward Ronaldo, who scored 34 goals during the same season.

He returned to the Football League in 1997 with Swansea City where he made over 80 appearances and finished the 1997–98 season as the club's top scorer. He was released by the club in 2000 and reunited with his former Swansea manager Jan Mølby at Kidderminster Harriers. Bird went on to play for Irish sides St. Patrick's Athletic and Drogheda United before finishing his career with spells at non-league side Bath City and Welsh Premier sides Carmarthen Town, Cardiff Grange Quinns and Haverfordwest County.

== Career ==
=== Cardiff City ===
Born in Cardiff, Bird began his career at Cardiff City coming through the club's youth system, making his debut in August 1992 when he replaced Cohen Griffith during a 3–2 win over Walsall. He went on to make three starts during his first season and scored his first league goal in a 2–1 victory over Carlisle United as the Bluebirds won promotion to Division Two. Bird remained at Cardiff for the next three years, including playing in a 2–1 defeat to Barry Town in the Welsh Cup final in May 1994, replacing Garry Thompson as a substitute, and scoring twice against Standard Liège in the first leg of the first round of the 1993–94 European Cup Winners' Cup, although never fully managing to hold down a first team place and was released at the start of the 1996–97 season, despite scoring twice in the opening three games, in an attempt to cut costs at Ninian Park as the club began experiencing financial difficulties.

=== Barry Town ===
He joined Barry Town midway through the 1995–96 season, scoring 9 goals in 16 league appearances to help Barry win the League of Wales title. The following season, in his only full year at the club, he scored 42 league goals, finishing as the league's top scorer. His total also made him the top goalscorer in any league in Europe, however this was the first season that the European Golden Shoe award was decided on a points system rather than total number of goals resulting in Bird losing out on the award to Brazilian international Ronaldo. Three years previously, the award had been unofficially given to another League of Wales forward, David Taylor. He also scored one goal against Aberdeen in the 1996–97 UEFA Cup. as Barry retained the League of Wales title and won the Welsh Cup, defeating Cwmbrân Town 2–1 in the final.

=== Football League return ===
His form prompted Swansea City boss Jan Mølby to bring him back into league football along with teammate Dave O'Gorman for a combined fee of £60,000. Bird was a regular in his first season at the club, finishing as the club's top scorer for the 1997–98 season with 18 goals, before eventually following Molby to his next club, Kidderminster Harriers, following his release from Swansea in 2000. Molby's assistant at Kidderminster was Bird's former Barry Town manager Gary Barnett. He made his debut for the Harriers on 12 August 2000 against Torquay United, but suffered a goal drought at the club for several months, leading manager Molby to publicly offer his backing to Bird, commenting:"It's a nightmare from a striker's point of view. He's trying his hardest, maybe a little bit too hard, but I'm sure it will all come good in the end." He eventually scored his first goals on his 17th appearance of the season, netting a late brace during a 2–1 victory over Kingstonian in a Championship Shield match on 8 November 2000. He was transfer listed in January 2001, but managed to force his way back into the side by switching to a right-midfield position during an injury crisis at the club. He credited being placed on the transfer list as his motivation to prove himself at the club, stating: "What happened with the transfer-listing gave me a good kick up the backside. It made me get my head down and I concentrated on working hard."

=== Later career ===
He eventually moved to Ireland with St. Patrick's Athletic, having nearly moved to Shelbourne earlier in the summer, where he scored over 20 leagues goals in two seasons. At the end of the 2003–04 season, having finished as the club's top scorer in the league with 14 goals, Bird became embroiled in a dispute with the club over unpaid wages and, although the matter was later settled, he left the club for fellow League of Ireland Premier Division side Drogheda United. He moved back to Wales in 2005 after his contract at Drogheda was cancelled by mutual consent, joining Carmarthen Town to assist with their UEFA Cup qualifying matches against Longford Town however he did not feature in either leg. He joined Cardiff Grange Quinns in August 2005 where he made just one appearance before joining Bath City in September 2005 on an initial one-month deal, after a proposed move to Forest Green Rovers collapsed. He was later offered an extended contract at the club and remained there until the end of the season, turning down an offer from Newport County. He later also played for Haverfordwest County.

After his departure from Ireland, Bird attended a seven-week training course to become a qualified dog-groomer and, with help from the Professional Footballers' Association, now runs a business in the field in the Cardiff area. In 2011, Bird was appointed assistant manager to Craig Lima at Bridgend Town on a temporary basis, following the resignation of Mark Sage. The pair were later handed the job on a permanent basis. In 2016, Bird joined the coaching staff at Dinas Powys, working alongside Paul Giles. Bird has also been involved in the Show Racism the Red Card campaign and played in a charity match for a Show Racism the Red Card XI against a Football Association of Wales XI in 2012.

== Honours ==
Cardiff City

- Football League Third Division: 1992–93
- Welsh Cup runner-up: 1993–94

Barry Town

- League of Wales: 1995–96, 1996–97
- Welsh Cup: 1996–97

Swansea City

- Football League Third Division: 1999–2000

Individual

- League of Wales Golden Boot: 1996–97
