= Craig Stiens =

Welsh footballer (born 1984)

Personal information
- Full name: Craig Stiens
- Date of birth: 31 July 1984 (age 42)
- Place of birth: Swansea, Wales
- Position: Striker

Team information
- Current team: Merthyr Town

Senior career*
Years	Team	Apps	(Gls)
2002–2004	Leeds United	0	(0)
2002–2003	→ Swansea City (loan)	3	(0)
2004–2009	Merthyr Tydfil		
2009–2010	Neath	31	(14)
2010–2011	Merthyr Town		

International career
2000–2003	Wales U19	8	(1)
- * Club domestic league appearances and goals as of 11:00, 26 June 2010 (UTC)

Craig Stiens (born 31 July 1984, in Swansea) is a Welsh footballer currently without a club. A former Wales under-19 international, he began his career with Leeds United before making his professional debut in The Football League during a loan spell at Swansea City in 2002.

== Club career ==
Born in Swansea, Stiens spent his early years with Leeds United. In December 2002, he joined his home town club, Division Three side Swansea City on loan for the remainder of the 2002–03 season. He made his debut for the club two days after signing, coming on as a substitute in place of Jamie Wood during a 1–0 defeat to Exeter City on 14 December 2002. He made two more substitute appearances for the club in consecutive 1–0 defeats to Leyton Orient and Bristol Rovers but, despite spending a further five months on loan at Vetch Field, he did not make another league appearance before returning to Leeds.

He spent a further six months at Elland Road before being allowed to leave in January 2004 to sign for Southern League Premier Division side Merthyr Tydfil, making a goalscoring debut in a 3–0 win over Welling United. The following year, in his first full season with the club, he finished as the club's top scorer with 22 league goals as they reached the play-offs.

In May 2009, with Merthyr in financial difficulties, Stiens joined Welsh Premier League Neath, along with Merthyr teammates Matthew Harris and Ashley Evans, ahead of the club turning professional for the 2009–10 season. He scored 14 times in 31 league games as Neath finished in 9th place. At the end of the year, Stiens decided to return to Merthyr Town.

== International career ==
On 17 October 2000, Stiens made his debut for the Wales under-19 side at the age of just 16 when he replaced James Collins during a 1–0 defeat to Slovakia. He went on to win a further seven caps in the following three years, his only goal coming during an 8–2 win over Faroe Islands on 9 August 2001.
