= Chris Venables =

Welsh footballer (born 1985)

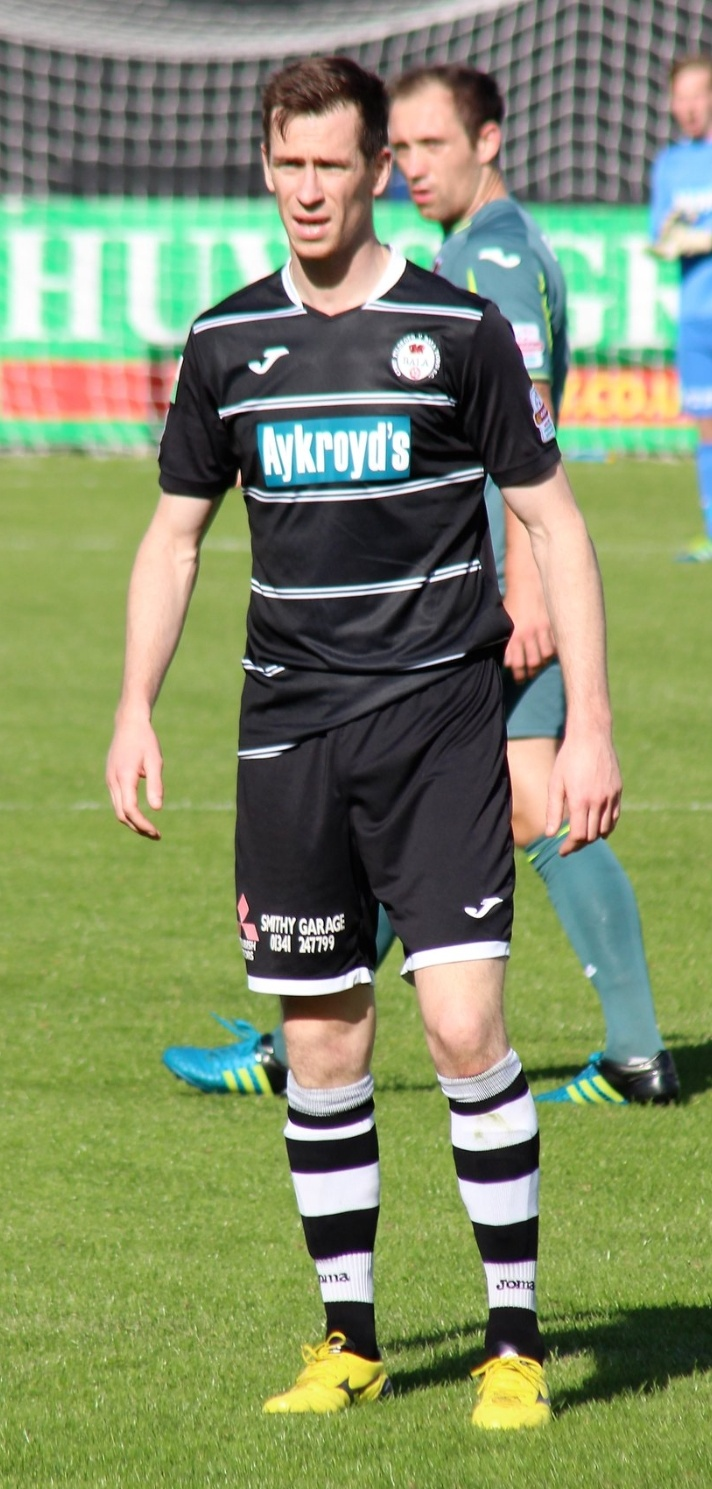
- Venables playing for Bala Town in 2016

Personal information
- Full name: Christopher Venables
- Date of birth: 23 July 1985 (age 41)
- Place of birth: Shrewsbury, England
- Height: 1.88 m (6 ft 2 in)
- Positions: Midfielder; striker

Team information
- Current team: Penybont
- Number: 9

Youth career
- Shrewsbury Town

Senior career*
Years	Team	Apps	(Gls)
2003–2007	Caersws	91	(25)
2007–2008	Welshpool Town	29	(8)
2008–2009	Aberystwyth Town	27	(3)
2009–2012	Llanelli Town	100	(19)
2012–2016	Aberystwyth Town	98	(73)
2016–2023	Bala Town	185	(90)
2023–	Penybont	86	(31)

International career
	Wales Semi-Pro U23	5	
2018–2019	Wales Semi-Pro	2	(1)
- * Club domestic league appearances and goals as of 08:15, 8 November 2026 (UTC)

Christopher Venables (born 23 July 1985) is a Welsh semi-professional footballer who plays as a striker for Cymru Premier club Penybont. He has been described as "one of the most acclaimed players ... [and has] earned a reputation as one of the most talented and consistent players in the league".

== Early life ==
Venables was born on 28 July 1985. He is a native of Llandinam, Wales. He attended Llanidloes High School in Powys, and grew up supporting Caersws. As a youth player, he joined the academy of English club Shrewsbury Town.

== Club career ==
Venables mainly operates as a midfielder or striker. He started his career with Caersws, with whom he won the 2007 Welsh League Cup. He then spent a season each with Welshpool Town and Aberystwyth Town, appearing in the 2009 Welsh Cup final with the latter, before signing for Llanelli Town in 2009. In the 2010–11 season, Llanelli won the Welsh Cup, with Venables scoring his side's fourth goal in a 4–1 defeat of Bangor City. While with Llanelli, he played in both legs of the first qualifying round of the UEFA Europa League on three occasions, but they would be eliminated by their opponents each time. Due to the club's Welsh Cup win, they qualified for the second qualifying round, facing Dinamo Tbilisi. Venables only played in the second leg, which saw Llanelli fall to a 5–0 loss.

In January 2013, he returned to Aberystwyth Town, where he moved further upfield to the striker position, becoming better known for his goalscoring prowess. In the 2013–14 season, Aber reached the 2014 Welsh Cup final against The New Saints. Owing to a first-half Venables brace, Aber were on the cusp of winning their first Welsh Cup since the 1899–1900 season, but the team would go on to concede three unanswered goals in the second-half. However, as runners-up, Aber qualified for the first qualifying round of the Europa League, since The New Saints won the league and thus qualified for the second qualifying round of the Champions League. Although Venables played in both legs, Aber were defeated 9–0 on aggregate by Derry City. During the calendar year of 2014, Venables scored 39 times, outscoring that year's Ballon d'Or winner, Cristiano Ronaldo, by one goal and Lionel Messi by four. As of December 2014, he had an average of 1.24 goals per game, behind Ronaldo's average of 1.64 goals per game. He was the league's top scorer for three consecutive seasons, and was the Player of the Season in back-to-back seasons.

In July 2016, he signed for Bala Town. In the 2016–17 season, Bala won the Welsh Cup for the first time, with Venables assisting Kieran Smith for the winning goal in a 2–1 victory over The New Saints. Having finished third in the league, Bala qualified for the first qualifying round of the Europa League, but were knocked out by Vaduz, with Venables scoring Bala's only goal over two legs. In the 2019–20 season, Venables led the league in goalscoring again, before the season was cut short due to the COVID-19 pandemic. At the time, Bala were third in the league, and given that the season abruptly ended, they were awarded with qualification for the Europa League. On 27 August 2020, Venables' sole goal against Valletta saw Bala progress to the second qualifying round for the first time in their history. However, they would be knocked out by Standard Liège, with Venables having a first-half penalty saved. On 2 May 2021, he scored a hat-trick against Barry Town United, securing qualification for the Conference League. His first goal of the match was also his 200th in Cymru Premier history, becoming the fifth player to have done so, after Marc Lloyd Williams, Rhys Griffiths, Michael Wilde and Lee Hunt. On 17 May, Venables received his fifth Golden Boot. Despite an early exit from the Conference League against Larne, Venables helped the club achieve second place in the 2021–22 season, securing qualification for the Conference League once again. In July 2022, Bala faced Sligo Rovers over two legs, which ended in a penalty shoot-out victory for the Irish side; Venables had been one of three players to successfully convert his penalty. In what became Venables' final season with Bala, the club finished fifth and reached both domestic cup finals, defeating Connah's Quay Nomads on penalties in the 2023 Welsh League Cup final, but were comfortably beaten 6–0 by The New Saints in the 2023 Welsh Cup final.

In June 2023, he signed for Penybont. As Penybont finished third the previous season, they qualified for the first qualifying round of the Europa Conference League; their first time competing in Europe. Venables scored the equaliser in the first leg against Santa Coloma, but he would be sent off in the second leg, as the Andorran side scored twice in extra-time to reach the next round. On 26 September 2023, Venables became the Cymru Premier's record appearance holder with 537, overtaking his former teammate Wyn Thomas, marking the occasion by scoring the only goal of the match against Barry Town United. In the return fixture on 10 February 2024, Venables was sent off in the first half, in an eventual 2–2 draw. In the 2024–25 season, Penybont finished as runners-up and qualified for the Conference League first qualifying round, allowing Venables another shot at European football. The qualification was secured when Connah's Quay lost 2–1 to The New Saints in the 2025 Welsh Cup final; had the Nomads won, they would have taken Penybont's spot in the Conference League. Venables appeared in the second leg against Kauno Žalgiris as a second-half substitute, by which point the Lithuanian club had an unassailable lead on aggregate. During the 2025–26 season, Venables missed a number of league matches through suspension, and was dismissed on two occasions in December 2025. Owing to alleged violent conduct in a match against Connah's Quay, he was retroactively suspended for three matches by the Football Association of Wales (FAW). In a Welsh Cup third round tie against Flint Town United, he was sent off in the seventh minute, for a challenge that was deemed dangerous. This saw Griffiths, now his manager, publicly question the integrity of the referee, which resulted in him being charged, and serving a touchline ban the following month. However, Venables would be sent off again in a match against Briton Ferry Llansawel. Penybont finished sixth in the league, which was enough to advance to one-off play-off matches for the last remaining spot of the Conference League first qualifying round. In the semi-final against Colwyn Bay, which ended in a 5–3 penalty shoot-out victory for Penybont; Venables was first up to successfully convert his penalty. In the final against Haverfordwest County, Venables scored the opening goal in a 2–0 win, and Penybont were later drawn with Santa Coloma for the second time in three years. Venables played in both legs, as Penybont were defeated 4–0 on aggregate.

== International career ==
In 2007, Venables was called up for the first time by the Wales national semi-professional football team at the Four Nations Tournament. He eventually made his debut in 2018, during a 3–2 loss to England C, where he scored a consolation goal. The following year, he was capped again in a 2–2 draw against the same opposition, assisting Adam Roscrow for Wales' second-half equaliser. In the years between his first call up and his debut, he had been capped five times for the under-23 semi-professional national team.

== Honours ==
Caersws

- Welsh League Cup: 2006–07

Llanelli Town

- Welsh Cup: 2010–11

Bala Town

- Welsh Cup: 2016–17
- Welsh League Cup: 2022–23

Individual

- Welsh Premier League/Cymru Premier Golden Boot (5): 2013–14, 2014–15, 2015–16, 2019–20, 2020–21
- Welsh Premier League/Cymru Premier Player of the Season (3): 2013–14, 2014–15, 2019–20
