= 2019–20 Cymru Premier =

Cymru Premier Uwch Gynghrair Cymru
- Season: 2019–20
- Dates: 16 August 2019 – 19 May 2020
- Champions: Connah's Quay
- Relegated: Airbus UK Broughton; Carmarthen Town
- Champions League: Connah's Quay
- Europa League: The New Saints; Bala Town; Barry Town
- Matches: 132
- Goals: 388 (2.94 per match)
- Top goalscorer: Chris Venables (24 goals)
- Biggest home win: Barry Town United 7–1 Carmarthen Town (18 January 2020)
- Biggest away win: Airbus UK Broughton 0–12 The New Saints (30 November 2019)
- Highest scoring: Airbus UK Broughton 0–12 The New Saints (30 November 2019)
- All statistics correct as of 1 May 2020.

The 2019–20 Cymru Premier (Welsh: Uwch Gynghrair Cymru 2019-20) (known as JD Cymru Premier for sponsorship reasons) was the 28th season of the Cymru Premier (formerly known as The Welsh Premier League), the highest football league within Wales since its establishment in 1992. Thirteenth-time champions, The New Saints were the defending champions, having won their eighth consecutive title in 2019. The season commenced on 16 August 2019 and concluded in March 2020, a few weeks earlier than the scheduled end date of 25 April 2020. Teams played each other twice on a home and away basis, before the league split into two groups after phase 1 matches were completed on 17 January 2020 – the top six and the bottom six.

== Effects of the 2019–20 coronavirus pandemic ==
On 13 March 2020, all games were suspended due to the COVID-19 pandemic. On 19 May 2020, the league was cancelled. Connah's Quay Nomads F.C. were declared the champions, for the first time in their history. They were given the league's bid to the 2020–21 UEFA Champions League. The New Saints and Bala Town finished 2nd and 3rd respectively, earning the league's two places in the 2020–21 UEFA Europa League first qualifying round.

The 2019–20 Welsh Cup was postponed and could not be completed by the UEFA deadline of entering European qualification. Therefore, the 4th-placed finished team, Barry Town, earned the preliminary round spot that would have normally gone to the winners of the European play-offs which would now not take place. The bottom two teams at the date of suspension were relegated.

== Teams ==
Twelve teams competed in the league – the top ten teams from the previous season, and one team each promoted from the Cymru North and Cymru South.

The two bottom placed teams from the 2018-2019 season, Llandudno, and Llanelli Town, were relegated to Cymru North and Cymru South, respectively, for the 2019–20 season.

Airbus UK Broughton, champions of the now defunct Cymru Alliance and Penybont, champions of the Welsh Football League Division One were promoted to the Cymru Premier. Airbus UK Broughton returned to the Cymru Premier after two years in the now defunct Cymru Alliance, while Bridgend-based Penybont were making their first appearance in the Cymru Premier having only been formed in 2013. By replacing Llanelli Town, the South Wales-based clubs remained at four.

=== Stadia and locations ===
Aberystwyth Town	Airbus UK Broughton	Bala Town	Barry Town United
Park Avenue	Hollingsworth Group International Airfield	Maes Tegid	Jenner Park Stadium
Capacity: 5,000	Capacity: 1,600	Capacity: 3,000	Capacity: 3,500
Caernarfon Town	Locations of the 2019–20 Cymru Premier teams		Cardiff Metropolitan University
The Oval	Locations of the 2019–20 Cymru Premier teams		Cyncoed Campus
Capacity: 3,000	Locations of the 2019–20 Cymru Premier teams		Capacity: 1,620
Carmarthen Town	Locations of the 2019–20 Cymru Premier teams		Cefn Druids
Richmond Park	Locations of the 2019–20 Cymru Premier teams		The Rock
Capacity: 3,000	Locations of the 2019–20 Cymru Premier teams		Capacity: 3,000
Connah's Quay Nomads	Newtown	Penybont	The New Saints
Deeside Stadium	Latham Park	Kymco Stadium	Park Hall
Capacity: 1,500	Capacity: 5,000	Capacity: 3,000	Capacity: 2,034

=== Personnel and kits ===
Team	Head coach	Captain	Kit manufacturer	Front shirt sponsor
Aberystwyth Town	(England) Matthew Bishop	(Wales) Marc Williams	Acerbis	Aberystwyth University
Airbus UK Broughton	(Wales) Steve O'Shaughnessy	(Wales) Paul Harrison	Umbro	Gardner Aerospace
Bala Town	(England) Colin Caton	(Wales) Chris Venables	Macron	Aykroyd's
Barry Town United	(Wales) Gavin Chesterfield	(Wales) Jordan Cotterill	Macron	RIM Motors, LDS Motor Factors
Caernarfon Town	(Wales) Huw Griffiths	(Wales) Nathan Craig	Errea	Gofal Bro Cyf, Parc Gwêl y Fenai
Cardiff Metropolitan University	(Wales) Christian Edwards	(England) Bradley Woolridge	Errea	Cardiff Metropolitan University
Carmarthen Town	(Wales) Kristian O'Leary	(Wales) Lee Surman	Kappa	Gravells Seat, Castell Howell Foods
Cefn Druids	(England) Stuart Gelling	(England) Neil Ashton	Errea	Wrexham Lager
Connah's Quay Nomads	(Scotland) Andy Morrison	(England) George Horan	Nike	Gap Personnel
Newtown	(Scotland) Chris Hughes	(Wales) Craig T. Williams	Errea	Control Techniques
Penybont	(Wales) Rhys Griffiths	(Wales) Rhys Wilson	Macron	Nathaniel House of Cars
The New Saints	(Wales) Scott Ruscoe	(England) Paul Harrison	Legea	RUK Group

== League table ==
Pos	Team	Pld	W	D	L	GF	GA	GD	Pts	PPG	Qualification or relegation (Note: Teams play each other twice (22 matches), before the league splits into two groups (the top six and the bottom six) for the last 10 matches.)
1	Connah's Quay Nomads (C)	26	16	8	2	47	19	+28	56	2.15	Qualification for the Champions League first qualifying round
2	The New Saints	26	16	4	6	69	27	+42	52	2.00	Qualification to the Europa League first qualifying round
3	Bala Town	26	15	4	7	53	23	+30	49	1.88	Qualification to the Europa League first qualifying round
4	Barry Town United	25	12	6	7	35	29	+6	42	1.68	Qualification to the Europa League preliminary round
5	Caernarfon Town	26	11	5	10	36	38	−2	38	1.46	
6	Newtown	25	10	5	10	25	30	−5	35	1.40	
7	Cardiff Metropolitan University	25	9	8	8	30	29	+1	35	1.40	
8	Cefn Druids	25	10	5	10	37	39	−2	35	1.40	
9	Aberystwyth Town	26	7	6	13	36	55	−19	27	1.04	
10	Penybont	25	5	6	14	29	48	−19	21	0.84	
11	Carmarthen Town (R)	25	4	6	15	28	49	−21	18	0.72	Relegation to Cymru North or Cymru South
12	Airbus UK Broughton (R)	26	4	5	17	28	67	−39	17	0.65	Relegation to Cymru North or Cymru South

Updated to match(es) played on 7 March 2020. Source: Cymru Premier, Soccerway
Rules for classification: 1) Points; 2) Goal difference; 3) Goals scored; 4) Matches won; 5) Play-off.
(C) Champions; (R) Relegated

== Results ==
Teams played each other twice on a home and away basis, before the league split into two groups – the top six and the bottom six.

=== Matches 1–22 ===
Home \ Away	ABE	AIR	BAL	BAR	CAE	CMU	CMR	CDR	CQN	NTW	PYB	TNS
Aberystwyth Town	—	1–2	0–5	0–1	2–3	2–2	3–2	1–3	1–1	1–2	1–0	1–10
Airbus UK Broughton	1–5	—	1–2	0–1	2–3	1–1	1–0	1–1	0–4	2–0	1–2	0–12
Bala Town	2–0	1–0	—	1–1	3–0	1–2	2–1	1–2	0–1	4–0	4–0	3–1
Barry Town United	3–1	2–0	2–2	—	0–0	1–1	7–1	1–0	0–4	0–1	3–0	1–4
Caernarfon Town	0–3	5–0	1–2	4–1	—	2–1	2–0	1–1	0–0	1–0	3–2	1–0
Cardiff Metropolitan University	1–2	1–0	1–0	0–1	2–0	—	0–3	2–1	0–1	1–0	1–1	1–1
Carmarthen Town	0–0	2–2	0–3	0–1	0–1	2–2	—	1–2	1–2	1–2	3–2	2–6
Cefn Druids	1–2	3–1	0–3	1–0	3–1	2–1	3–3	—	2–0	1–2	2–3	0–5
Connah's Quay Nomads	4–1	2–1	2–1	2–0	4–2	1–1	1–1	1–0	—	3–1	3–1	1–1
Newtown	0–0	0–0	1–0	2–3	3–1	1–0	1–0	0–0	1–1	—	1–1	0–2
Penybont	1–1	3–1	1–6	1–2	0–0	1–3	1–1	2–3	0–0	0–2	—	2–3
The New Saints	2–0	6–2	1–0	0–1	1–0	1–2	1–0	2–1	2–1	2–1	2–1	—

Source: Cymru Premier
Legend: Blue = home team win; Yellow = draw; Red = away team win.

== Season statistics ==
As of 22 December 2019

=== Scoring ===
==== Top scorers ====
Rank	Player	Club	Goals
1	(Wales) Chris Venables	Bala Town	15
2	(New Zealand) Greg Draper	The New Saints	13
3	(Wales) Kayne McLaggon	Barry Town United	10
4	(Wales) Henry Jones	Bala Town	9
4	(Wales) Eliot Evans	Cardiff Metropolitan University	9
4	(England) Jamie Insall	Connah's Quay Nomads	9
4	(England) Louis Robles	Bala Town	9
7	(Republic of Ireland) Dean Ebbe	The New Saints	8
8	(England) Michael Bakare	Connah's Quay Nomads	7
8	(Wales) James Davies	Cefn Druids	7
8	(Wales) Luke Bowen	Carmarthen	7
8	(England) Andy Owens	Airbus UK Broughton	7
