= 2004–05 Welsh Premier League =

Welsh Premier League
- Season: 2004–05
- Champions: Total Network Solutions
- Relegated: Afan Lido
- Champions League: Total Network Solutions
- UEFA Cup: Rhyl; Carmarthen Town
- Intertoto Cup: Bangor City
- Matches played: 306
- Goals scored: 892 (2.92 per match)
- Top goalscorer: Marc Lloyd Williams (31)

The 2004–05 Welsh Premier League was the 13th season of the Welsh Premier League since its establishment as the League of Wales in 1992. It began on 14 August 2004 and ended on 29 April 2005. The league was won by Total Network Solutions, their second title.

== League table ==
Pos	Team	Pld	W	D	L	GF	GA	GD	Pts	Qualification or relegation
1	Total Network Solutions (C)	34	23	9	2	83	25	+58	78	Qualification for Champions League first qualifying round
2	Rhyl	34	23	5	6	70	31	+39	74	Qualification for UEFA Cup first qualifying round
3	Bangor City	34	20	7	7	73	44	+29	67	Qualification for Intertoto Cup first round
4	Haverfordwest County	34	17	12	5	50	28	+22	63	
5	Caersws	34	19	5	10	67	39	+28	62	
6	Carmarthen Town	34	17	10	7	60	34	+26	61	Qualification for UEFA Cup first qualifying round (Note: As 2005–06 Welsh Cup Runners-up)
7	Cwmbran Town	34	15	8	11	52	47	+5	53	
8	Aberystwyth Town	34	15	8	11	45	40	+5	53	
9	Welshpool Town	34	14	9	11	55	46	+9	51	
10	Newtown	34	13	7	14	49	55	−6	46	
11	Porthmadog	34	11	12	11	38	39	−1	45	
12	Connah's Quay Nomads	34	9	9	16	48	58	−10	36	
13	Port Talbot Town	34	6	11	17	36	49	−13	29	
14	Llanelli	34	8	5	21	42	84	−42	29	
15	Caernarfon Town	34	7	7	20	28	72	−44	28	
16	Airbus UK	34	5	9	20	36	76	−40	24	
17	NEWI Cefn Druids	34	5	7	22	30	72	−42	22	
18	Afan Lido (Note: Afan Lido deducted three points for fielding a suspended player.) (R)	34	6	6	22	29	52	−23	21	Relegation to Welsh Division One

Rules for classification: 1) points; 2) goal difference; 3) number of goals scored.
(C) Champions; (R) Relegated

== Results ==
Home \ Away	ABE	AFA	AIR	BAN	CAE	CWS	CMR	CDR	CQN	CWM	HAV	LLA	NTW	PTT	POR	RHY	TNS	WEL
Aberystwyth Town		1–1	1–0	1–2	5–0	1–0	0–0	2–1	1–0	0–1	4–0	2–0	1–1	0–0	0–0	1–2	1–1	0–0
Afan Lido	0–0		4–0	2–3	1–0	1–0	0–2	1–0	0–1	0–2	0–1	1–1	1–3	0–1	1–1	1–2	0–2	0–1
Airbus UK	1–2	1–4		0–0	1–1	0–3	0–1	1–2	3–3	0–1	1–2	0–3	2–2	3–1	0–1	1–0	0–6	0–2
Bangor City	4–2	1–0	5–0		2–0	1–0	0–1	2–0	2–0	0–3	1–1	6–0	2–3	3–2	0–2	2–1	1–0	4–2
Caernarfon Town	0–2	0–0	0–3	2–1		0–1	0–5	2–0	1–1	1–1	0–2	1–4	1–2	3–1	3–1	1–4	0–7	1–3
Caersws	4–1	4–1	3–0	2–2	3–1		1–2	7–0	1–2	5–2	1–0	2–0	2–0	2–2	0–1	1–4	0–0	2–1
Carmarthen Town	4–1	1–1	3–0	3–3	1–2	1–1		1–1	2–2	1–1	4–2	5–1	3–2	2–0	2–1	0–1	0–1	1–1
NEWI Cefn Druids	0–1	3–0	2–2	0–4	0–1	0–5	0–1		0–5	1–3	0–2	2–3	0–2	1–0	1–2	0–3	1–3	2–1
Connah's Quay Nomads	0–2	4–2	1–2	3–4	1–2	2–1	1–2	4–0		1–2	2–2	1–3	0–3	0–2	3–1	1–1	0–7	1–1
Cwmbran Town	2–3	1–0	4–4	0–3	2–1	1–4	0–2	3–3	1–0		0–2	2–0	1–2	3–1	2–1	0–1	2–2	2–0
Haverfordwest County	4–1	2–1	6–1	1–1	1–1	0–0	0–0	1–1	0–0	1–0		3–0	2–1	3–1	0–0	2–1	0–0	3–0
Llanelli	2–4	3–1	2–2	5–1	2–1	2–4	0–3	1–4	0–2	0–4	0–3		2–2	1–2	1–1	2–1	0–4	1–2
Newtown	2–3	1–0	0–1	0–0	2–1	1–3	0–4	2–2	2–1	1–2	3–0	4–0		3–2	1–1	0–1	0–3	1–6
Port Talbot Town	0–1	1–2	3–2	1–4	0–0	0–1	0–0	1–1	2–2	1–1	0–1	4–0	0–0		1–2	1–3	2–2	3–0
Porthmadog	2–0	2–0	3–3	3–0	2–0	0–1	3–2	0–0	0–0	1–1	0–2	1–1	0–2	1–0		0–3	1–2	1–1
Rhyl	1–0	3–1	2–0	2–3	5–1	3–0	3–1	3–2	4–2	0–0	0–0	2–0	3–0	1–0	3–1		1–2	2–2
Total Network Solutions	3–1	2–1	1–1	1–1	5–0	5–0	2–0	1–0	2–1	2–0	2–0	4–2	3–0	1–1	2–1	2–2		1–0
Welshpool Town	2–0	2–1	2–1	1–5	1–1	2–3	3–0	2–0	0–1	3–2	1–1	4–0	2–1	0–0	1–1	1–2	5–2	

Legend: Blue = home team win; Yellow = draw; Red = away team win.
