= 2001–02 League of Wales =

League of Wales
- Season: 2001–02
- Champions: Barry Town
- Relegated: Rhayader Town
- Champions League: Barry Town
- UEFA Cup: Total Network Solutions; Bangor City
- Intertoto Cup: Caersws
- Matches played: 306
- Goals scored: 964 (3.15 per match)
- Top goalscorer: Marc Lloyd Williams (47)

The 2001–02 League of Wales was the tenth season of the League of Wales since its establishment in 1992. It began on 17 August 2001 and ended on 20 April 2002. The league was won for the second consecutive season by Barry Town, their sixth title overall.

== League table ==
| Pos | Team | Pld | W | D | L | GF | GA | GD | Pts | Qualification or relegation |
|---|---|---|---|---|---|---|---|---|---|---|
| 1 | Barry Town (C) | 34 | 23 | 8 | 3 | 82 | 29 | +53 | 77 | Qualification for Champions League first qualifying round |
| 2 | Total Network Solutions | 34 | 21 | 7 | 6 | 65 | 33 | +32 | 70 | Qualification for UEFA Cup qualifying round |
| 3 | Bangor City | 34 | 21 | 6 | 7 | 83 | 38 | +45 | 69 | Qualification for UEFA Cup qualifying round |
| 4 | Caersws | 34 | 18 | 4 | 12 | 65 | 44 | +21 | 58 | Qualification for Intertoto Cup first round |
| 5 | Afan Lido | 34 | 18 | 4 | 12 | 42 | 36 | +6 | 58 | |
| 6 | Rhyl | 34 | 17 | 5 | 12 | 53 | 45 | +8 | 56 | |
| 7 | Cwmbran Town | 34 | 17 | 4 | 13 | 66 | 53 | +13 | 55 | |
| 8 | Connah's Quay Nomads | 34 | 14 | 9 | 11 | 56 | 46 | +10 | 51 | |
| 9 | Aberystwyth Town | 34 | 14 | 9 | 11 | 53 | 46 | +7 | 51 | |
| 10 | Carmarthen Town | 34 | 13 | 9 | 12 | 51 | 37 | +14 | 48 | |
| 11 | Caernarfon Town | 34 | 12 | 8 | 14 | 64 | 64 | 0 | 44 | |
| 12 | Port Talbot Town | 34 | 12 | 7 | 15 | 44 | 55 | −11 | 43 | |
| 13 | Newtown | 34 | 9 | 11 | 14 | 35 | 44 | −9 | 38 | |
| 14 | Flexsys Cefn Druids | 34 | 8 | 8 | 18 | 49 | 79 | −30 | 32 | |
| 15 | Llanelli | 34 | 8 | 7 | 19 | 41 | 64 | −23 | 31 | |
| 16 | Oswestry Town | 34 | 8 | 6 | 20 | 39 | 84 | −45 | 30 | |
| 17 | Haverfordwest County | 34 | 6 | 10 | 18 | 45 | 76 | −31 | 28 | |
| 18 | Rhayader Town (R) | 34 | 3 | 6 | 25 | 29 | 89 | −60 | 15 | Relegation to Cymru Alliance |

Rules for classification: 1) points; 2) goal difference; 3) number of goals scored.
(C) Champions; (R) Relegated

== Results ==
| Home \ Away | ABE | AFA | BAN | BAR | CAE | CWS | CMR | CDR | CQN | CWM | HAV | LLA | NTW | OSW | PTT | RHA | RHY | TNS |
|---|---|---|---|---|---|---|---|---|---|---|---|---|---|---|---|---|---|---|
| Aberystwyth Town | | 2–0 | 2–1 | 2–2 | 0–0 | 1–3 | 1–1 | 1–1 | 2–0 | 3–0 | 0–0 | 3–1 | 2–2 | 3–0 | 4–1 | 1–0 | 1–1 | 1–3 |
| Afan Lido | 0–1 | | 1–0 | 1–1 | 3–0 | 2–1 | 1–0 | 0–0 | 0–2 | 2–0 | 3–0 | 2–1 | 1–0 | 3–0 | 2–1 | 4–1 | 2–1 | 0–2 |
| Bangor City | 2–0 | 1–0 | | 2–2 | 3–3 | 1–1 | 3–0 | 6–0 | 2–1 | 1–3 | 3–0 | 2–0 | 2–1 | 2–1 | 3–1 | 1–0 | 3–0 | 3–0 |
| Barry Town | 4–1 | 3–2 | 1–1 | | 2–0 | 0–3 | 0–0 | 6–0 | 0–1 | 2–1 | 5–0 | 2–0 | 3–0 | 7–1 | 3–0 | 5–0 | 1–0 | 3–1 |
| Caernarfon Town | 4–1 | 2–1 | 1–3 | 1–5 | | 3–3 | 1–2 | 4–2 | 2–1 | 0–2 | 6–0 | 4–5 | 0–0 | 4–1 | 1–2 | 2–0 | 3–2 | 0–1 |
| Caersws | 2–1 | 6–0 | 2–1 | 1–4 | 2–1 | | 1–1 | 0–0 | 1–2 | 2–0 | 3–0 | 2–1 | 1–0 | 2–3 | 2–1 | 3–0 | 2–0 | 1–2 |
| Carmarthen Town | 2–1 | 3–0 | 0–0 | 1–2 | 5–1 | 3–0 | | 0–2 | 2–2 | 1–2 | 1–2 | 0–0 | 3–1 | 3–2 | 0–1 | 5–0 | 1–0 | 3–1 |
| Flexsys Cefn Druids | 1–2 | 1–2 | 3–7 | 0–2 | 1–3 | 2–1 | 0–4 | | 1–2 | 2–4 | 2–2 | 0–1 | 1–0 | 1–2 | 0–2 | 4–2 | 2–0 | 2–2 |
| Connah's Quay Nomads | 1–2 | 2–0 | 4–2 | 2–2 | 1–2 | 1–2 | 0–0 | 2–1 | | 4–2 | 2–2 | 0–6 | 2–2 | 5–1 | 0–0 | 1–1 | 2–1 | 0–0 |
| Cwmbran Town | 2–0 | 0–1 | 3–6 | 1–2 | 3–2 | 3–2 | 1–1 | 5–1 | 2–1 | | 2–2 | 6–1 | 0–1 | 8–2 | 0–0 | 4–2 | 0–3 | 0–4 |
| Haverfordwest County | 2–3 | 0–1 | 2–4 | 0–1 | 2–2 | 2–4 | 0–3 | 2–2 | 0–3 | 2–0 | | 2–1 | 2–0 | 4–1 | 0–0 | 3–3 | 1–2 | 3–3 |
| Llanelli | 3–2 | 0–1 | 2–6 | 1–1 | 1–0 | 2–0 | 1–0 | 1–1 | 1–1 | 0–3 | 3–4 | | 1–1 | 2–2 | 1–2 | 1–1 | 0–3 | 1–3 |
| Newtown | 1–1 | 1–3 | 2–0 | 0–1 | 3–3 | 1–0 | 1–0 | 2–2 | 1–0 | 1–1 | 2–1 | 1–0 | | 1–1 | 1–3 | 1–0 | 2–2 | 0–1 |
| Oswestry Town | 2–5 | 0–3 | 0–1 | 0–2 | 1–1 | 1–3 | 1–1 | 0–5 | 1–0 | 0–2 | 3–2 | 0–1 | 0–0 | | 3–0 | 2–0 | 2–2 | 1–5 |
| Port Talbot Town | 1–1 | 1–1 | 1–0 | 2–3 | 1–4 | 1–0 | 1–0 | 6–2 | 0–2 | 1–2 | 1–1 | 3–2 | 3–1 | 2–3 | | 1–2 | 2–3 | 1–0 |
| Rhayader Town | 0–2 | 0–0 | 0–7 | 0–3 | 0–1 | 2–6 | 2–4 | 3–4 | 0–4 | 0–3 | 3–2 | 3–0 | 0–3 | 1–2 | 1–1 | | 1–3 | 0–1 |
| Rhyl | 3–0 | 1–0 | 0–3 | 3–1 | 3–1 | 1–3 | 3–1 | 1–2 | 0–4 | 1–0 | 2–1 | 2–0 | 1–0 | 2–0 | 3–1 | 1–1 | | 1–1 |
| Total Network Solutions | 2–1 | 2–0 | 1–1 | 1–1 | 2–2 | 1–0 | 3–0 | 2–1 | 5–1 | 0–1 | 2–1 | 1–0 | 3–2 | 1–0 | 4–0 | 4–0 | 1–2 | |

Legend: Blue = home team win; Yellow = draw; Red = away team win.
