= David Taylor (Welsh footballer) =

Welsh footballer and manager

Personal information
- Full name: David Taylor
- Date of birth: 25 August 1965 (age 61)
- Place of birth: Wales
- Position: Striker

Team information
- Current team: Caernarfon Town (coach)

Senior career*
Years	Team	Apps	(Gls)
1992–1993	Conwy United	17	(8)
1993–1994	Porthmadog	59	(58)
1994–1995	Inter Cardiff	19	(11)
1995	Conwy United	12	(3)
1995–1996	Newtown	16	(3)
1996–1997	Holywell Town	31	(18)
1997	Newtown	19	(2)
1997–1998	Welshpool Town	38	(14)
1999–2000	Flexsys Cefn Druids	5	(0)
2000–2001	Oswestry Town	7	(0)
2007–2009	Caersws	2	(1)
Total		225	(118)

Managerial career
- 2007–: Caersws (assistant manager)
- * Club domestic league appearances and goals

David Taylor (born 25 August 1965) is a retired Welsh footballer and current manager. A former forward, he achieved the feat of scoring the most goals in European football leagues during the 1993–94 season with Porthmadog (he received a golden boot trophy from sponsors Adidas.

Following his retirement from football, David worked as a claims handler for Towergate Insurance Brokers until his retirement in 2024.

== Honours ==
Individual

- League of Wales Golden Boot winner: 1993–94
- Top scorer in European leagues: 1993–94
