= Marc Lloyd Williams =

Welsh footballer

Personal information
- Full name: Marc Lloyd Williams
- Date of birth: 8 February 1973 (age 53)
- Place of birth: Bangor, Wales
- Position: Striker

Team information
- Current team: Llanberis

Senior career*
Years	Team	Apps	(Gls)
1992–1994	Porthmadog	75	(28)
1994–1995	Bangor City	29	(21)
1995–1996	Stockport County	18	(1)
1996	→ Haugesund (loan)	5	(0)
1996	Altrincham	3	(0)
1996	Colwyn Bay	20	(14)
1996–1998	Bangor City	58	(31)
1998–1999	Halifax Town	24	(6)
1999	York City	11	(4)
1999–2000	York City	22	(5)
2000–2002	Bangor City	55	(68)
2002–2003	Southport	18	(3)
2003	Bangor City	17	(10)
2003–2004	Aberystwyth Town	32	(18)
2004–2006	TNS	67	(60)
2006–2007	Bangor City	30	(19)
2007–2008	Newtown	20	(16)
2008	Rhyl	13	(7)
2008–2009	Porthmadog	33	(24)
2009–2010	Airbus UK Broughton	34	(16)
2010–2011	Newtown	4	(1)
2012–2014	Llanberis	13	(7)
2026–	Llanberis	2	(1)
Total		578	(346)

International career
- Wales B
- * Club domestic league appearances and goals as of 14:01, 27 August 2026 (UTC)

Marc Lloyd Williams (born 8 February 1973) is a Welsh footballer who plays as a forward for Llanberis. He is the Welsh Premier League's all-time top scorer, with 319 goals.

== Career ==
Williams was born in Bangor, and brought up in Llanberis. He has played for a number of clubs including Bangor City (5 spells), TNS, Stockport County, Haugesund, York City, Aberystwyth Town, Halifax Town, Southport, Altrincham, Colwyn Bay, Porthmadog (2 spells), Newtown (2 spells) and Rhyl.

Other honours include Wales B international appearances. Welsh Premier championship medal (3), Welsh Cup winner's medal (twice), Welsh Premier Golden Boot award (twice) and Norwegian First Division Championship medal.

Williams was the highest scorer in all European leagues with 47 goals in the 2001–02 season, but did not win the European Golden Boot as the Welsh Premier League has a lower co-efficient than some of Europe's bigger leagues. He joined Southport in July 2002. He then returned to Bangor in February 2003. Williams then joined Aberystwyth Town in June 2003, and probably enjoyed one of the best spells of his career, playing attractive football and scoring freely.

Williams returned to Bangor City in July 2006. Williams left Bangor in 2007 to join Rhyl FC, where he made 20 appearances scoring 16 goals, he then joined Newtown where he made 11 appearances scoring 5 goals. He returned to his roots rejoining Porthmadog for the start of the 2008–09 season.

In October 2010 he signed for Newtown again.

He is currently the all-time top scorer in the League of Wales, with 319 goals in 467 appearances.

Williams later played for Llanberis and retired in 2014.

In November 2016 he had a stroke.

In 2026, at 53 years old, he came out of retirement to sign for Llanberis again. His first appearance was in the Welsh Cup, scoring in an 8–0 win against Amlwch Town.

== Honours ==
Individual

- League of Wales Player of the Season: 2001–02
- Welsh Premier League Team of the Year: 2004–05
