= 2024–25 Cymru Premier =

Cymru Premier Uwch Gynghrair Cymru
- Season: 2024–25
- Dates: 9 August 2024 – 18 May 2025
- Champions: The New Saints (17th title)
- Relegated: Aberystwyth Town; Newtown
- UEFA Champions League: The New Saints
- UEFA Conference League: Haverfordwest County; Penybont
- Matches: 192
- Goals: 578 (3.01 per match)
- Top goalscorer: Louis Lloyd/Rhys Hughes (10 goals)
- Biggest home win: The New Saints 5–0 Flint Town United (15 October 2024); Connah's Quay Nomads 7–2 Flint Town United (26 December 2024)
- Biggest away win: Newtown 1–6 The New Saints (27 September 2024)
- Highest scoring: Connah's Quay Nomads 7–2 Flint Town United (26 December 2024)
- Longest winning run: 12 – The New Saints (22 December 2024–22 March 2025)
- Longest unbeaten run: 12 – The New Saints (22 December 2024–22 March 2025)
- Longest winless run: 13 – Newtown (15 October 2024–22 February 2025)
- Longest losing run: 9 – Aberystwyth Town (26 August 2024–15 October 2024)
- Highest attendance: 1,486 - Haverfordwest County 1–0 Aberystwyth Town (1 January 2025)
- Lowest attendance: 144 - Cardiff Metropolitan University 2–0 Flint Town United (14 December 2024)
- Average attendance: 403

The 2024–25 Cymru Premier (Welsh: Uwch Gynghrair Cymru 2024–25; known as the JD Cymru Premier for sponsorship reasons) was the 33rd season of the Cymru Premier (formerly known as the Welsh Premier League), the highest football league within Wales since its establishment in 1992.

The New Saints were the season's champions, their fourth successive title.

== Teams ==
The league consisted of twelve teams; the top ten teams from the previous season, one team promoted from the Cymru North, and one team promoted from the Cymru South. The New Saints entered the season as defending champions (for the third consecutive season).

The promoted teams were 2023–24 Cymru North runners-up Flint Town United (after champions Holywell Town failed to secure a Tier 1 licence), and 2023–24 Cymru South champions Briton Ferry Llansawel. They replaced the 2023–24 Cymru Premier bottom two teams, Colwyn Bay (relegated after one year in the top-flight) and Pontypridd United (relegated after two years in the top-flight). Flint Town United returned to the top-flight after a single-season absence, while Briton Ferry Llansawel marked their debut (not including former guise Briton Ferry Athletic).

=== Stadia and locations ===
Locations of the 2024–25 Cymru Premier teams

Team	Location	Stadium	Capacity
Aberystwyth Town	Aberystwyth	Park Avenue	5,000
Bala Town	Bala	Maes Tegid	3,000
Barry Town United	Barry	Jenner Park Stadium	2,650
Briton Ferry Llansawel	Briton Ferry	Old Road	2,300
Caernarfon Town	Caernarfon	The Oval	3,000
Cardiff Metropolitan University	Cyncoed	Cyncoed Campus	1,620
Connah's Quay Nomads	Flint	Cae-y-Castell	3,000
Flint Town United	Flint	Cae-y-Castell	3,000
Haverfordwest County	Haverfordwest	Bridge Meadow Stadium	2,100
Newtown	Newtown	Latham Park	5,000
Penybont	Bridgend	SDM Glass Stadium	3,000
The New Saints	(England) Oswestry	Park Hall	2,034

=== Personnel and kits ===
Team	Head coach	Captain	Kit manufacturer	Front shirt sponsor
Aberystwyth Town	(England) Antonio Corbisiero	(England) Jack Thorn	Acerbis	Aberystwyth University
Bala Town	(England) Colin Caton	(Wales) Nathan Peate	Macron	Aykroyd's
Barry Town United	(Wales) Andy Legg	(Wales) Kayne McLaggon	Macron	RIM Motors
Briton Ferry Llansawel	(Wales) Andy Dyer	(Wales) Alex Gammond	Macron	Woodpecker Garden Buildings
Caernarfon Town	(Wales) Richard Davies	(Wales) Darren Thomas	Surridge Sport	Williams Timber Solutions
Cardiff Metropolitan University	(Wales) Ryan Jenkins	(Wales) CJ Craven	Erreà	Cardiff Metropolitan University
Connah's Quay Nomads		(Republic of Ireland) John Disney	Adidas	Castle Green Homes
Flint Town United	(Wales) Lee Fowler	(Wales) Harry Owen	Macron	Essity
Haverfordwest County	(Wales) Tony Pennock	(Wales) Dylan Rees	Tor Sports	Gelli Mor
Newtown		(Wales) Shane Sutton	Adidas	Nidec
Penybont	(Wales) Rhys Griffiths	(Wales) Kane Owen	Macron	Nathaniel Cars
The New Saints	(England) Craig Harrison	(England) Danny Redmond	Macron	SiFi Networks

=== Managerial changes ===
Team	Outgoing manager	Manner of departure	Date of vacancy	Position in table	Incoming manager	Date of appointment
Connah's Quay Nomads	(Wales) Neil Gibson	Resigned	13 August 2024	10th	(England) Billy Paynter	24 August 2024
Aberystwyth Town	(Wales) Anthony Williams	Resigned	8 October 2024	12th	(England) Antonio Corbisiero	12 November 2024
Newtown	(Wales) Scott Ruscoe	Sacked	5 November 2024	9th	(Wales) Callum McKenzie	22 November 2024
Barry Town United	(Wales) Steve Jenkins	Restructure	31 January 2025	7th	(Wales) Andy Legg	31 January 2025
Newtown	(Wales) Callum McKenzie	Sacked	8 April 2025	11th	(England) Nathan Leonard	3 May 2025
Connah's Quay Nomads	(England) Billy Paynter	Sacked	13 April 2025	11th		

== Regular season ==
=== League table ===
Pos	Team	Pld	W	D	L	GF	GA	GD	Pts	Qualification
1	The New Saints	22	17	0	5	61	26	+35	51	Qualification for the Championship Conference
2	Penybont	22	15	5	2	42	16	+26	50	Qualification for the Championship Conference
3	Haverfordwest County	22	11	7	4	29	11	+18	40	Qualification for the Championship Conference
4	Caernarfon Town	22	10	4	8	35	35	0	34	Qualification for the Championship Conference
5	Bala Town	22	7	11	4	28	21	+7	32	Qualification for the Championship Conference
6	Cardiff Metropolitan University	22	9	5	8	32	29	+3	32	Qualification for the Championship Conference
7	Barry Town United	22	8	6	8	32	38	−6	30	Qualification for the Play-Off Conference
8	Connah's Quay Nomads	22	7	5	10	32	26	+6	26	Qualification for the Play-Off Conference
9	Briton Ferry Llansawel	22	6	3	13	33	45	−12	21	Qualification for the Play-Off Conference
10	Flint Town United	22	6	2	14	27	47	−20	20	Qualification for the Play-Off Conference
11	Newtown	22	5	4	13	24	46	−22	19	Qualification for the Play-Off Conference
12	Aberystwyth Town	22	4	2	16	18	53	−35	14	Qualification for the Play-Off Conference

Source: Cymru Premier
Rules for classification: 1) Points; 2) Goal difference; 3) Goals scored; 4) Head-to-head goal difference; 5) Head-to-head goals scored; 6) Head-to-head away goals scored; 7) Matches won; 8) Away matches won.

=== Results ===
Teams play each other twice, once at home and once away.

Home \ Away	ABE	BAL	BAR	BFL	CAE	CMU	CQN	FTU	HAV	NEW	PEN	TNS
Aberystwyth Town	—	0–0	1–0	1–6	3–1	1–2	1–1	0–2	0–3	3–1	0–3	2–4
Bala Town	3–0	—	3–1	2–0	0–2	0–1	0–0	2–0	0–2	2–2	1–2	1–0
Barry Town United	1–0	1–1	—	3–1	1–1	2–1	3–2	3–2	1–1	1–2	1–2	1–4
Briton Ferry Llansawel	4–0	2–2	0–0	—	0–1	1–5	1–5	1–1	1–2	2–1	0–2	3–1
Caernarfon Town	1–4	0–0	3–2	3–2	—	1–2	3–1	3–0	1–2	1–2	1–5	2–5
Cardiff Metropolitan University	3–0	3–3	1–1	1–3	1–2	—	2–1	2–0	0–0	2–1	1–1	0–2
Connah's Quay Nomads	3–0	0–2	1–2	2–1	1–1	1–0	—	7–2	0–1	1–1	0–1	1–2
Flint Town United	3–0	2–2	1–2	2–1	1–2	1–2	0–1	—	1–0	2–0	0–1	1–4
Haverfordwest County	1–0	0–0	1–1	5–1	0–0	1–0	0–0	4–1	—	3–0	0–0	0–1
Newtown	4–1	0–0	2–4	1–0	0–4	2–1	0–3	2–4	0–2	—	1–2	1–6
Penybont	5–1	1–1	4–1	0–1	2–0	2–2	1–0	3–1	1–1	0–0	—	2–1
The New Saints	2–0	2–3	4–0	5–2	1–2	3–0	2–1	5–0	2–1	2–1	3–2	—

Source: Cymru Premier
Legend: Blue = home team win; Yellow = draw; Red = away team win.

== Championship Conference ==
The top six teams from the regular season entered the Championship Conference, playing every other team in the group for the third and fourth time (once at home and once away). Results from the regular season were carried over into this round.

=== League table ===
Pos	Team	Pld	W	D	L	GF	GA	GD	Pts	Qualification
1	The New Saints (C)	32	26	0	6	89	31	+58	78	Qualification for the Champions League first qualifying round
2	Penybont	32	19	7	6	56	32	+24	64	Qualification for the Conference League first qualifying round (Note: The 2024–25 Welsh Cup winners qualified for the Conference League first qualifying round. Since the cup winners (The New Saints) qualified based on league position, the Conference League spot was passed to the second-placed team.)
3	Haverfordwest County (O)	32	13	12	7	39	26	+13	51	Qualification for the Conference League first qualifying round play-off final
4	Caernarfon Town	32	14	6	12	53	51	+2	48	Qualification for the Conference League first qualifying round play-off quarter-finals
5	Cardiff Metropolitan University	32	12	8	12	43	46	−3	44	Qualification for the Conference League first qualifying round play-off quarter-finals
6	Bala Town	32	8	13	11	38	43	−5	37	Qualification for the Conference League first qualifying round play-off quarter-finals

Source: Cymru Premier
Rules for classification: 1) Points; 2) Goal difference; 3) Goals scored; 4) Head-to-head goal difference; 5) Head-to-head goals scored; 6) Head-to-head away goals scored; 7) Matches won; 8) Away matches won.
(C) Champions; (O) Play-off winners

=== Results ===
Home \ Away	BAL	CAE	CMU	HAV	PEN	TNS
Bala Town	—	1–3	0–0	0–0	3–2	0–2
Caernarfon Town	5–0	—	2–1	1–1	3–2	0–1
Cardiff Metropolitan University	2–1	4–2	—	1–1	2–1	0–6
Haverfordwest County	3–2	1–1	1–0	—	1–2	1–3
Penybont	3–2	3–1	0–0	0–0	—	1–0
The New Saints	2–1	2–0	3–1	5–1	4–0	—

Source: Cymru Premier
Legend: Blue = home team win; Yellow = draw; Red = away team win.

== Play-Off Conference ==
The bottom six teams from the regular season entered the Play-Off Conference, playing every other team in the group for the third and fourth time (once at home and once away). Results from the regular season were carried over into this round.

=== League table ===
Pos	Team	Pld	W	D	L	GF	GA	GD	Pts	Qualification or relegation
7	Barry Town United	32	15	7	10	55	51	+4	52	Qualification for the Conference League first qualifying round play-off quarter-finals
8	Connah's Quay Nomads	32	12	6	14	47	35	+12	42	
9	Flint Town United	32	13	3	16	48	62	−14	42	
10	Briton Ferry Llansawel	32	9	5	18	46	65	−19	32	
11	Newtown (R)	32	6	8	18	36	65	−29	26	Relegation to the Cymru North
12	Aberystwyth Town (R)	32	6	3	23	28	71	−43	21	Relegation to the Cymru South

Source: Cymru Premier
Rules for classification: 1) Points; 2) Goal difference; 3) Goals scored; 4) Head-to-head goal difference; 5) Head-to-head goals scored; 6) Head-to-head away goals scored; 7) Matches won; 8) Away matches won.
(R) Relegated

=== Results ===
Home \ Away	ABE	BAR	BFL	CQN	FTU	NEW
Aberystwyth Town	—	1–2	0–1	1–1	1–2	0–1
Barry Town United	2–1	—	5–0	0–2	3–1	2–1
Briton Ferry Llansawel	2–3	3–4	—	1–0	1–2	1–1
Connah's Quay Nomads	3–0	0–2	0–1	—	4–0	1–0
Flint Town United	2–0	3–2	3–1	2–1	—	4–0
Newtown	2–3	1–1	2–2	2–3	2–2	—

Source: Cymru Premier
Legend: Blue = home team win; Yellow = draw; Red = away team win.

== Conference League play-off ==
Teams placed 2nd–7th qualified for one-off play-off matches, with the winners earning the second spot in the 2025–26 UEFA Conference League first qualifying round; the higher-placed team per game received home advantage. As the league lost a place in the Conference League due to a decrease in coefficient score, the play-off format was changed from previous seasons to include the 2nd-placed team. Teams finishing 4th-7th qualified for the quarter-finals; the 2nd and 3rd-placed teams qualified for the semi-finals.

Since the 2024–25 Welsh Cup winners (The New Saints) finished in the top two (1st), the 2nd-placed team qualified automatically for the Conference League and the spot was vacated; the 3rd-placed team received a bye to the final.

=== Bracket ===
Quarterfinals
4	Caernarfon Town	5
7	Barry Town United	2
5	Cardiff Metropolitan University	1
6	Bala Town	0

Semifinals
4	Caernarfon Town	0 (4)
5	Cardiff Metropolitan University	0 (2)

Final
3	Haverfordwest County	3
4	Caernarfon Town	1

=== Quarter-finals ===
26 April 2025	Caernarfon Town (4th)	5–2	Barry Town United (7th)	Caernarfon
12:15	Lloyd 23', 45+1', 58' (pen.), 73'; Davies 46'	Report	Richards 6'; McLaggon 86'	Stadium: The Oval; Attendance: 834; Referee: John Jones

26 April 2025	Cardiff Metropolitan University (5th)	1–0	Bala Town (6th)	Cyncoed
14:30	Reynolds 90+3'	Report		Stadium: Cyncoed Campus Stadium; Attendance: 291; Referee: Aaron Wyn Jones

=== Semi-final ===
11 May 2025	Caernarfon Town (4th)	0–0 (4–2 p)	Cardiff Metropolitan University (5th)	Caernarfon
17:10		Report		Stadium: The Oval; Attendance: 1,568; Referee: Ryan Kenny
	Penalties
	Lloyd (penalty scored); Lock (penalty scored); Owen (penalty scored); Canavan (penalty scored)		(penalty scored) Veale; (penalty scored) Rees; (penalty missed) Evans; (penalty missed) Chubb

=== Final ===
18 May 2025	Haverfordwest County (3rd)	3–1	Caernarfon Town (4th)	Haverfordwest
17:10	Ahmun 17', 86'; Hawkins 33'	Report	Lloyd 90+4'	Stadium: Bridge Meadow Stadium; Attendance: 1,717; Referee: Bryn Markham-Jones

== Season statistics ==
As of 8 April 2025

=== Top scorers ===
Rank	Player	Club	Goals
1	(Wales) Louis Lloyd	Caernarfon Town	16
1	(Wales) James Crole	Penybont	16
3	(Wales) Rhys Hughes	Connah's Quay Nomads	15
3	(England) Ollie Hulbert	Barry Town United	15
5	(England) Aramide Oteh	The New Saints	13
6	(England) Aaron Williams	Newtown	11
6	(Wales) Ben Ahmun	Haverfordwest County	11
6	(England) Elliott Reeves	Flint Town United	11

=== Hat-tricks ===
As of 23 March 2025

Player	For	Against	Result	Date
(Wales) Sion Bradley	The New Saints	Flint Town United	1–4 (A)	16 August 2024
(England) Zack Clarke	Caernarfon Town	Briton Ferry Llansawel	3–2 (H)	14 September 2024
(Ivory Coast) Florian Yonsian	Flint Town United	Aberystwyth Town	3–0 (H)	4 December 2024
(Wales) Harry Owen	Flint Town United	Briton Ferry Llansawel	3–1 (H)	22 February 2025
(England) Adam Wilson	The New Saints	Cardiff Metropolitan University	0–6 (A)	22 March 2025

Notes

(H) – Home team
(A) – Away team

=== Monthly awards ===
As of 23 March 2025

Month	Player of the Month		Manager of the Month	
Month	Manager	Club	Player	Club
July/ August	Ryan Reynolds	Cardiff Metropolitan University	Tony Pennock	Haverfordwest County
September	Sion Bradley	The New Saints	Rhys Griffiths	Penybont
October	Keenan Patten	Barry Town United	Tony Pennock	Haverfordwest County
November	James Crole	Penybont	Rhys Griffiths	Penybont
December	Alex Gammond	Briton Ferry Llansawel	Andy Dyer	Briton Ferry Llansawel
January	Ben Ahmun	Haverfordwest County	Richard Davies	Caernarfon Town
February	Danny Davies	The New Saints	Craig Harrison	The New Saints
March	Will Fuller	Briton Ferry Llansawel	Rhys Griffiths	Penybont
April	Louis Lloyd	Caernarfon	Richard Davies	Caernarfon

=== Attendances ===
Team	Highest	Lowest	Average
Aberystwyth Town	503	254	352
Bala Town	421	160	272*
Barry Town United	812	270	433
Briton Ferry Llansawel	1384	152	549
Caernarfon Town	959	364	576
Cardiff Metropolitan University	528	144	285
Connah's Quay Nomads	387	170	234
Flint Town United	670	185	341
Haverfordwest County	1486	220	520
Newtown	580	192	334
Penybont	1235	354	618
The New Saints	1234	179	360

Figures taken from FAW Cymru Football app and other club channels. Correct as of 14 April 2025.

* Denotes incomplete record, as some attendance figures are missing. Figures Bala v Cardiff Met (29/3) have not been publicly recorded. Average is total of home attendances recorded divided by actual number of home games played.

== See also ==
- 2024–25 Cymru North
- 2024–25 Cymru South
- 2024–25 Welsh League Cup
- 2024–25 Welsh Cup
- 2024–25 Ardal Leagues
