= Penybont F.C. =

Association football club in Bridgend, Wales

Penybont
- Full name: Penybont Football Club
- Nickname: Bont
- Short name: PFC
- Founded: 2013; 13 years ago (merger between Bridgend Town and Bryntirion Athletic)
- Ground: DragonBet Stadium, Bridgend
- Capacity: 1,200
- Coordinates: 51°30′43.1″N 3°36′32.1″W
- Chairman: Alan Whiteley
- Manager: Rhys Griffiths
- League: Cymru Premier
- 2025–26: Cymru Premier, 6th of 12
- Website: https://penybontfc.cymru
Home colours	Away colours

Penybont Football Club (Welsh: Clwb Pêl-droed Penybont) is a Welsh football club based in Bridgend (Welsh: Pen-y-bont ar Ogwr), that plays in the Cymru Premier. The club was formed in 2013, following the merger of Bridgend Town and Bryntirion Athletic. Penybont play their home games at Bryntirion Park, currently known as The DragonBet Stadium for sponsorship reasons.

== History ==
As part of the deal to merge the two largest football clubs in Bridgend, artificial turf was laid at Bryntirion Park and at the Bridgend College Football Academy in Pencoed. This work was funded by the sale of Bridgend Town's Coychurch Road ground to superstore chain ASDA.

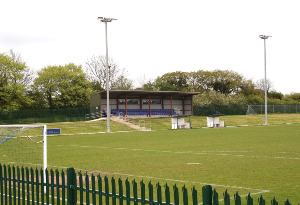
The Bryntirion Park ground circa 2009.

The club began its inaugural season with a series of away games because Bryntirion Park's new pitch installation was incomplete until January 2014. The club's first league game was away against Ton Pentre, the result of which was a 1–0 defeat.

The new pitch was officially opened by former Cardiff City manager Malky Mackay on 7 January 2014 at a friendly game played against a Cardiff City Development XI. Cardiff's development team won the match 5–0.

The club's first manager was Francis Ford, who managed Bryntirion Athletic prior to the club's merger with Bridgend Town. Penybont ended their inaugural season in third place in the Welsh Football League Division One.

On 18 January 2015, the club announced that it had reached a sponsorship agreement with Bridgend-based KYMCO Healthcare UK, which included renaming Bryntirion Park as The KYMCO Stadium.

The club finished the 2014–15 season in 5th place in Welsh League Division One.

On 12 September 2015, the club announced that it had applied for a Football Association of Wales Domestic License for the Cymru Premier. This indicated that the club was committed to improving the facilities at Bryntirion Park in order to make the club applicable for promotion to the top flight.

In May 2016, Francis Ford resigned from his post as manager to be replaced by former Plymouth Argyle, Newport County and Cymru Premier footballer Rhys Griffiths. On 11 June, former Cardiff City and Newport County player Martyn Giles was appointed as his assistant.

On 13 April 2019, it was confirmed that the club had secured promotion to the Cymru Premier after promotion rivals Cambrian & Clydach Vale and Cwmamman United suffered defeats.

On 4 July 2019, former Dundee F.C. and Partick Thistle player Daniel Jefferies signed for the club.

On 23 December 2021, the club announced the signing of former Swansea City, AFC Bournemouth and Wales international Shaun MacDonald on an 18-month deal.

In the 2022–23 season they finished in 3rd place qualifying them for their first-ever Europe game, against FC Santa Coloma in the first qualifying round of the 2023–24 UEFA Europa Conference League.

== European record ==
As of match played 16 July 2025

Season	Competition	Round	Club	Home	Away	Agg.
2023–24	UEFA Europa Conference League	1QR	(Andorra) FC Santa Coloma	1–1	0–2 (a.e.t.)	1–3
2025–26	UEFA Conference League	1QR	(Lithuania) Kauno Žalgiris	1–1	0–3	1–4
2026–27	UEFA Conference League	1QR	(Andorra) FC Santa Coloma	0–1	0–3	0–4

Notes

- QR: Qualifying round

== Current squad ==
As of 18 September 2026

Note: Flags indicate national team as defined under FIFA eligibility rules; some limited exceptions apply. Players may hold more than one non-FIFA nationality.

No.	Pos.	Nation	Player
1	GK	WAL	Dan Higgs (on loan from Cardiff City)
2	DF	WAL	Kai Ludvigsen
3	DF	ENG	Max Melbourne
4	MF	ENG	Tom Mehew
5	DF	WAL	Alyas Debono (on loan from Cardiff City)
6	DF	WAL	Mael Davies (Captain)
7	FW	WAL	Nathan Wood
8	MF	WAL	Owen Pritchard
9	FW	WAL	Chris Venables
10	FW	WAL	Ethan Cann
11	FW	ENG	Jonathan Leko
12	DF	GBS	Eduino Vaz
14	FW	WAL	Ioan Phillips
15	MF	WAL	Jac Clay
16	DF	WAL	Billy Borge

No.	Pos.	Nation	Player
17	DF	WAL	Daniel Jefferies
18	DF	WAL	Morgan Weaver
19	MF	ENG	Ryan Hill
20	MF	GBS	Marinho Manga
21	DF	WAL	Ash Baker
23	FW	ENG	Tyler Walker
24	MF	WAL	Danny Barrow
25	GK	WAL	Alex Pennock
32	DF	WAL	Liam Shephard
33	DF	WAL	Ethan Vaughan
35	GK	WAL	Jay Price
55	MF	WAL	Jamie Mashlan
72	MF	WAL	Jacob Villacorta

== Club honours ==
=== League ===
- Cymru Premier
  - Runners-up: 2024–25
- Southern Football League
  - Winners: 1979–80 (as Bridgend Town)
- Welsh Football League Division One
  - Winners: 1968–69, 1972–1973 (as Bridgend Town); 2010–2011 (as Bryntirion Athletic); 2018–19 (as Penybont)
  - Runners-up: 1975–76 (as Everwarm); 1976–77, 1984–85, 1985–86 (as Bridgend Town)
- Welsh Football League Division Two
  - Winners: 1996–97 (as Bridgend Town)
- Welsh Football League Division Three
  - Winners: 2003–04 (as Bryntirion Athletic)

=== Cups ===
- Welsh Cup
  - Runners-up: 2021–22
  - Semi finalists: 1976–77, 2008–09 (as Bridgend Town); 2022–23
- Welsh Football League Cup
  - Winners: 1987–88 (as Bridgend Town)
  - Runners-up: 1998–99 (as Bridgend Town); 2007–08, 2012–13 (as Bryntirion Athletic)
