= Scott Quigley =

English footballer (born 1992)

Personal information
- Full name: Scott David Quigley
- Date of birth: 2 September 1992 (age 34)
- Place of birth: Shrewsbury, England
- Height: 6 ft 4 in (1.93 m)
- Position: Forward

Youth career
- 2009–2012: The New Saints

Senior career*
Years	Team	Apps	(Gls)
2012–2017	The New Saints	86	(25)
2011–2012	→ Caersws (loan)		
2012	→ Carmarthen Town (loan)	5	(0)
2013–2014	→ Cefn Druids (loan)		
2017–2019	Blackpool	9	(0)
2018	→ Wrexham (loan)	17	(8)
2018–2019	→ Port Vale (loan)	11	(0)
2019	→ FC Halifax Town (loan)	15	(2)
2019–2021	Barrow	73	(35)
2021–2023	Stockport County	33	(6)
2022–2023	→ Rochdale (loan)	26	(5)
2023–2025	Eastleigh	63	(13)
Total		338	(94)
- * Club domestic league appearances and goals

Scott David Quigley (born 2 September 1992) is an English former professional footballer who played as a forward. He scored 126 goals in 403 league and cup appearances throughout a 12-year career in English and Welsh football.

A pacey two-footed striker, he had a three-year scholarship with The New Saints before becoming professional at the club in 2012. Following loan spells with Caersws, Carmarthen Town and Cefn Druids, he went on to score 61 goals in 122 appearances for TNS. During his five years at the club, he won five Welsh Premier League titles, three Welsh Cup titles and three Welsh League Cup titles, including two successive trebles in the 2014–15 and 2015–16 seasons. He was signed by Blackpool in 2017 and spent time on loan at Wrexham, Port Vale, and FC Halifax Town. He signed for Barrow in 2019. He helped the club to win promotion to the Football League as champions of the National League in the 2019–20 season. He left Barrow to sign with Stockport County in 2021 and won the National League title for the second time in three seasons in 2021–22. He was loaned to Rochdale for the 2022–23 campaign. He returned to non-League football after signing with Eastleigh in July 2023, where he stayed for two seasons.

== Career ==
=== The New Saints ===
Quigley joined New Saints in 2009 on a three-year scholarship programme. He went on loan to Cymru Alliance side Caersws in September 2011, though inadvertently cost the "Bluebirds" a three-point deduction after the club made an error during his registration. He signed a two-year professional contract with TNS in May 2012. He made his debut for the club on 12 September, coming on as an 86th-minute substitute for Simon Spender in a 1–0 defeat at Prestatyn Town. On 11 October 2012, he joined Welsh Premier League rivals Carmarthen Town on a one-month loan deal. He made an "explosive start" to his time at Richmond Park, helping to create a goal a minute after coming on as a half-time substitute during a 4–2 defeat to Connah's Quay Nomads. He made five appearances for Mark Aizlewood's "Old Gold", and went on to make a total of seven appearances for TNS by the end of the 2012–13 season as the Oswestry based club won the league title by a 22-point margin over Airbus UK Broughton.

On 16 August 2013, he went out on loan to Cymru Alliance side Cefn Druids. He scored two goals in six appearances for TNS during the 2013–14 campaign, with his first goals for the club coming in a 9–1 victory at Bangor City on 18 April. TNS again won the league under the stewardship of Craig Harrison, this time finishing 14 points clear of second-place Airbus UK Broughton. On 22 July 2014, he appeared in the UEFA Champions League for the first time, during the second round of qualification, as the Saints lost 2–0 at home to Slovak side ŠK Slovan Bratislava. He was named as the club's Young Player of the Year for the 2014–15 season, having scored 12 goals in 36 games. He also won his third Welsh Premier League title as TNS finished 18 points ahead of runners-up Bala Town. Two of his goals came in the final of the Welsh League Cup on 25 January, as the Saints triumphed 3–0 over Bala Town. On 2 May, he appeared as a 71st-minute substitute for Adrian Cieslewicz in the final of the Welsh Cup at Latham Park, which ended in a 2–0 victory over Newtown to secure TNS the domestic treble.

On 1 July 2015, he scored his first goal in European competition, as the Saints recorded a 2–1 win at Faroe Islanders B36 Tórshavn in the opening round of qualification. He received the first sending off of his career on 23 October, during stoppage time in a 4–0 win at Aberystwyth Town. He scored 18 goals from 39 appearances in the 2015–16 campaign, helping TNS to a fifth consecutive league title. He again appeared in the final of the Welsh League Cup, as TNS defeated Denbigh Town 2–0 at Maesdu Park on 25 January. They also retained their Welsh Cup title to complete their second-successive domestic treble, with Quigley scoring the second goal of a 2–0 victory over Airbus UK Broughton at the Racecourse Ground. He scored 16 goals in 26 games in the 2016–17 season, including two goals against San Marino side Tre Penne during Champions League qualification. TNS were again dominant in the league, finishing 27 points ahead of second-place Connah's Quay Nomads after recording a World record 27 consecutive top-flight wins. They also secured a third straight Welsh League Cup title with a 4–0 win over Barry Town United at Cyncoed Stadium. However, they lost the Welsh Cup final, falling 2–1 to Bala Town at Nantporth. He opened the 2017–18 season in good form by scoring three goals during Champions League qualification as the Saints defeated Gibraltar side Europa in the first round. Manager Scott Ruscoe said that he was "absolutely made up for the lad" after Quigley secured a move into the English Football League following his eight-year spell at Park Hall.

=== Blackpool ===
On 16 August 2017, Quigley signed a two-year contract (with the option of a third) with League One side Blackpool after being signed for an initial fee of £35,000 (potentially rising to £50,000). Manager Gary Bowyer said that "he's a young, powerful forward who fits in with the model we're trying to develop at the club". He made his debut for the "Tangerines" on 29 August, playing the first 70 minutes of an EFL Trophy match against Wigan Athletic at Bloomfield Road, which went on to end as a penalty shoot-out defeat following a 1–1 draw. He made his first league appearance on 12 September, coming on as an injury time substitute for Kyle Vassell in a 3–1 victory at Plymouth Argyle. On 16 January 2018, Quigley joined National League side Wrexham on loan for the remainder of the 2017–18 season. Manager Dean Keates said that "all being the well the frustration that he has had from the first half of the season [with limited first-team opportunities at Blackpool] he can take it out on our opposition for the rest of the season for us". He scored a both goals on his debut at Hartlepool United. He scored another brace against Aldershot Town. Having failed to score in nine substitute league appearances and five EFL Trophy starts for the "Seasiders", he rediscovered his form with the "Dragons" and scored eight goals in 17 National League fixtures.

On 5 July 2018, Quigley joined League Two club Port Vale on loan for the whole of the 2018–19 season, where he was reunited with former TNS teammate Connell Rawlinson. Manager Neil Aspin stated that he had been recommended by coach Gary Brabin. Upon joining the "Valiants" Quigley said "It's going to be my first proper stint in the Football League and I can't wait to get started". He scored his first and only goal for the club on 13 November, opening the scoring during a 2–1 win at Walsall in the EFL Trophy. He was recalled to Blackpool in January after making just one league start and 12 further appearances at Vale Park.

On 3 January 2019, Quigley returned to the National League on loan, this time at FC Halifax Town; manager Jamie Fullarton said that "not only will Scott add another dimension to our squad and hopefully bring goals, his personality and character will fit seamlessly into the group. He is a great addition and a real coup for us to get such a signing across the line".

=== Barrow ===
On 20 May 2019, Quigley signed for National League side Barrow on a three-year deal. He was the division's top-scorer with 20 goals by the time the National League was suspended due to the coronavirus pandemic, though Quigley himself was also suspended following a red card in a 1–0 home defeat to Notts County on 7 March. Though the season was not resumed, Barrow went on to be promoted to the Football League as National League champions. He signed a new three-year contract in July 2020. He was voted as Barrow's Fans' Player of the Year. He was also named on the National League Team of the Year, along with teammates Josh Kay and John Rooney.

He took until late November to score his first goal of Barrow's return to the Football League, though manager David Dunn believed it would kick-start the striker's season. Dunn was sacked a few weeks later though, and new appointment Michael Jolley said that Quigley was "a focal point for the team, he's a threat and a real handful. He takes a lot of heat on behalf of the team... I'm really looking forward to working with him". Jolley's reign lasted just two months, but caretaker manager Rob Kelly kept faith in Quigley, who scored 15 goals from 41 appearances to help Barrow to finish above the League Two relegation zone at the end of the 2020–21 season.

=== Stockport County ===
On 15 July 2021, Quigley announced his departure from Barrow and returned to the National League to join Stockport County for an undisclosed fee, signing a three-year deal. He cited "family reasons" as the reason for his move to Edgeley Park and urged Barrow fans not to listen to "lies" to the contrary as new Barrow manager Mark Cooper stated that Stockport had offered a contract that Barrow could not compete with. On 17 November, he scored two goals as Stockport overturned a 3–1 deficit to beat League One side Bolton Wanderers in the first round of the FA Cup. He scored ten goals in 37 appearances throughout the 2021–22 season as Dave Challinor's "Hatters" secured a return to the Football League as champions of the National League.

Having been limited to four substitute appearances after Stockport's return to the EFL, Quigley joined Rochdale on a season-long loan on 1 September 2022. Manager Jim Bentley commented that "Scott is a player I've always admired and have come close to signing previously". He scored five goals in twenty starts and seven substitute appearances for Rochdale in the 2022–23 campaign as the club were relegated out of the Football League in last place.

=== Eastleigh ===
On 17 July 2023, Quigley returned to the National League when he joined Eastleigh. He scored 11 goals in 46 games during the 2023–24 season. He departed the club upon the expiration of his contract at the end of the 2024–25 season after contributing another three goals from 25 games.

== Style of play ==
Quigley is a pacey two-footed forward. Despite being 6 ft 4 in (1.93 m), he prefers to play with the ball on the ground.

== Career statistics ==
Appearances and goals by club, season and competition
Club	Season	League			National Cup (Note: Includes Welsh Cup, FA Cup)		League Cup (Note: Includes Welsh League Cup, EFL Cup)		Europe		Other		Total	
Club	Season	Division	Apps	Goals	Apps	Goals	Apps	Goals	Apps	Goals	Apps	Goals	Apps	Goals
The New Saints	2012–13	Welsh Premier League	6	0	0	0	1	0	0	0	0	0	7	0
The New Saints	2013–14	Welsh Premier League	6	2	0	0	0	0	0	0	0	0	6	2
The New Saints	2014–15	Welsh Premier League	28	6	3	2	4	4	1 (Note: Appearance(s) in UEFA Champions League)	0	0	0	36	12
The New Saints	2015–16	Welsh Premier League	28	9	3	4	4	4	4	1	0	0	39	18
The New Saints	2016–17	Welsh Premier League	18	8	3	4	3	1	4	2	2 (Note: Appearances in Scottish Challenge Cup)	1	30	16
The New Saints	2017–18	Welsh Premier League	0	0	0	0	0	0	4	3	0	0	4	3
The New Saints	Total		86	25	9	10	12	9	13	6	2	1	122	51
Carmarthen Town (loan)	2012–13	Welsh Premier League	5	0	0	0	0	0	–		0	0	5	0
Blackpool	2017–18	League One	9	0	0	0	0	0	–		5 (Note: Appearance(s) in EFL Trophy)	0	14	0
Blackpool	2018–19	League One	0	0	0	0	0	0	–		0	0	0	0
Blackpool	Total		9	0	0	0	0	0	0	0	5	0	14	0
Wrexham (loan)	2017–18	National League	17	8	0	0	0	0	—		0	0	17	8
Port Vale (loan)	2018–19	League Two	11	0	0	0	1	0	–		1	1	13	1
FC Halifax Town (loan)	2018–19	National League	15	2	0	0	0	0	—		0	0	15	2
Barrow	2019–20	National League	35	20	1	0	—		—		1	0	37	20
Barrow	2020–21	League Two	38	15	1	0	0	0	—		2	0	41	15
Barrow	Total		73	35	2	0	0	0	0	0	3	0	78	35
Stockport County	2021–22	National League	31	6	4	4	—		—		2 (Note: Appearance(s) in FA Trophy)	0	37	10
Stockport County	2022–23	League Two	2	0	0	0	2	0	—		0	0	4	0
Stockport County	Total		33	6	4	4	2	0	0	0	2	0	41	10
Rochdale (loan)	2022–23	League Two	26	5	0	0	—		—		1	0	27	5
Eastleigh	2023–24	National League	40	11	5	0	—		—		1	0	46	11
Eastleigh	2024–25	National League	23	2	1	0	—		—		1	1	25	3
Eastleigh	Total		63	13	6	0	0	0	0	0	2	1	71	14
Career total			338	94	21	14	15	9	13	6	16	3	403	126

== Honours ==
The New Saints

- Welsh Premier League: 2012–13, 2013–14, 2014–15, 2015–16, 2016–17
- Welsh Cup: 2013–14, 2014–15, 2015–16; runner-up: 2016–17
- Welsh League Cup: 2014–15, 2015–16, 2016–17; runner-up: 2012–13

Barrow

- National League: 2019–20

Stockport County

- National League: 2021–22

Individual

- National League Team of the Year: 2019–20
- Barrow Fans' Player of the Year: 2020–21
