= Connell Rawlinson =

Welsh footballer

Personal information
- Full name: Connell Patrick Rawlinson
- Date of birth: 22 September 1991 (age 35)
- Place of birth: Wrexham, Wales
- Height: 1.85 m (6 ft 1 in)
- Position: Defender

Senior career*
Years	Team	Apps	(Gls)
2009–2010	Chester City	3	(0)
2010–2018	The New Saints	142	(9)
2012	→ Newtown (loan)	5	(0)
2018–2019	Port Vale	28	(1)
2019–2024	Notts County	140	(3)
2024–2026	Chester	39	(2)
Total		357	(15)

International career
2011–2018	Wales C		

Managerial career
- 2026: Chester (interim)
- * Club domestic league appearances and goals

Connell Patrick Rawlinson (born 22 September 1991) is a Welsh football coach and former professional player.

Rawlinson was a defender and began his career at Chester City, making three Conference Premier appearances before the club was liquidated in March 2010. He joined The New Saints the following season and went on to spend the next eight years with the club, winning seven Welsh Premier League titles, four Welsh Cups, and five Welsh League Cup titles. He was also named in the 2017–18 Welsh Premier League Team of the Season. He switched to the English Football League when he signed with Port Vale in May 2018. He was given a free transfer to National League side Notts County in August 2019. He was named County's Player of the Year for the 2019–20 season. Though the club lost the play-off final, they secured promotion out of the play-offs in 2023. He left Notts County after five years at the club and signed with Chester in July 2024. He began his coaching career at Chester and was appointed interim manager in March 2026.

== Early life ==
Rawlinson was born in Wrexham after his mother chose that maternity hospital rather than Chester due to the family living between the two locations.

== Career ==
=== Chester City ===
Rawlinson began his career with Chester City, making his debut as a substitute against Oxford United at the age of 17 in 2009. He made two further Conference Premier substitute appearances in the 2009–10 season, which were officially chalked off after the club's records were expunged following their liquidation in March 2010.

=== The New Saints ===
Rawlinson joined The New Saints and made his debut in the Welsh Premier League on 29 August 2010, coming on for Phil Baker as a 61st-minute substitute in a 2–1 victory over Bala Town at Park Hall. He was handed his first start on 4 September, in a 2–1 defeat at Llanelli. He went on to play in the final of the Welsh League Cup, as TNS recorded a 4–3 victory over Llanelli on 2 May. He appeared a total of 21 times in the 2010–11 campaign and was offered professional terms at TNS for the 2011–12 season. He won a Wales semi-professional cap against Estonia in October 2011. He scored his first senior goal on 28 January, in a 4–0 victory over Newport County in the fourth round of the Welsh Cup. He was sent off for the first time in his career on 18 February, during a 2–1 win at Llanelli. TNS won the Welsh Premier League at the end of the 2011–12 season. Rawlinson was also an unused substitute as they won the 2012 Welsh Cup with a 2–0 victory over Cefn Druids at Nantporth.

He was loaned out to Newtown for six weeks in November 2012. His arrival at Latham Park allowed manager Bernard McNally to move Andy Jones from central defence to centre-forward. Rawlinson featured in five Welsh Premier League games for the "Robins", and played just six games for the "Saints" by the end of the 2012–13 season, who successfully defended their league title. One of these appearances were in the Welsh League Cup final, which ended in a penalty shoot-out defeat to Carmarthen Town following a 3–3 draw after extra time. He scored his first goal in the Welsh Premier League on 1 April 2014, in a 3–1 home win over Newtown. He ended the 2013–14 season with 16 appearances, helping the club to retain their league title again. TNS also won the Welsh Cup, though Rawlinson was again an unused substitute during the 3−2 victory over Aberystwyth Town at the Racecourse Ground.

He made his debut in the UEFA Champions League on 15 July 2014, in a 1–0 defeat at Slovak side ŠK Slovan Bratislava, during the Second Round of qualification. He scored four goals in 37 appearances across the 2014–15 campaign, helping TNS to a fourth consecutive league title. On 25 January, he played in a 3–0 win over Bala Town in the final of the Welsh League Cup. He also won his third Welsh Cup as TNS secured a domestic treble with a 2–0 win over Newtown at Latham Park on 2 May, though was substituted after ten minutes for Christian Seargeant. He was restricted to 19 appearances in the 2015–16 season, though TNS again won the league. He did though feature in the final of the Welsh League Cup, as TNS defeated Denbigh Town 2–0 at Maesdu Park. TNS also secured the Welsh Cup and another treble with a 2–0 victory over Airbus UK Broughton.

He re-established himself in the first team during the 2016–17 season, scoring two goals in 40 league and cup games, as TNS clinched a sixth straight league title. TNS won the League Cup for the fourth consecutive time with a 4–0 win over Barry Town United at Cyncoed Stadium. During the season the club set a World record by winning 27 consecutive top-flight games. However, they failed to retain the Welsh Cup, losing out 2–1 to Bala Town in the final. On 20 January 2018, he lifted his fifth Welsh League Cup title after helping TNS to overcome Cardiff Metropolitan University 1–0 in the final. On 2 February, he scored both TNS's goals in a 2–2 draw at Cefn Druids. Later that month he turned down the club's offer of a new contract, which was due to expire in the summer. He captained Wales C in a 3–2 defeat to England C in March 2018. He ended the 2017–18 campaign with three goals in 35 appearances, as TNS won a seventh consecutive league title. He was named in the 2017–18 Welsh Premier League Team of the Season.

=== Port Vale ===
On 23 May 2018, Rawlinson signed with Port Vale of the English Football League. He made his debut for the "Valiants" on the opening day of the 2018–19 season, a 3–0 win over Cambridge United at Vale Park on 4 August. After the game manager Neil Aspin said that "he has set his standards and proved that he can play at this level, but now he has to do it consistently". He remained one of the first names on the team sheet, though was frequently utilised at right-back rather than at his favoured spot as a centre-back. On 27 November, he scored with a "towering header" in a 3–0 win at Yeovil Town. He was named on the EFL team of the week. He dropped out of the first-team picture after Aspin left the club in January and was replaced by John Askey. He was transfer-listed in May 2019, though after a good pre-season managed to force himself back into Askey's first-team plans.

=== Notts County ===
Rawlinson signed for newly-relegated National League club Notts County on 5 August 2019. He scored two goals in 40 appearances for the "Magpies" in the 2019–20 season, which was permanently suspended on 26 March due to the COVID-19 pandemic in England, with Notts County in the play-offs in third-place. County reached the play-off final at Wembley Stadium, though Rawlinson was an unused substitute as they lost the match 3–1 to Harrogate Town. Supporters voted him as Player of the Season, whilst he shared the Players' Player of the Season award with Kyle Wootton.

He played 43 games in the 2020–21 campaign, helping the club to again qualify for the play-offs, and said he was keen to extend his stay at Meadow Lane for as long as possible. Though County's defensive record was sound, new manager Ian Burchnall – who succeeded Neal Ardley in March – wanted the team to improve in front of goal. Rawlinson admitted he needed to do more in this regard as he failed to register a goal during the campaign. Notts County reached the play-off semi-finals, where they were beaten 4–2 by Torquay United after extra time. He featured 29 times in the 2021–22 season, helping County to qualify for the play-offs with a fifth-place finish. However, he was an unused substitute as they were beaten 2–1 by Grimsby Town after extra-time in the play-off quarter-finals. He made 28 league appearances in the 2022–23 campaign, as County finished as runners-up to his hometown club Wrexham despite amassing over 100 points. He played in the 2023 National League play-off final as County secured their place in the Football League with a penalty shoot-out victory over Chesterfield. He signed a new two-year contract in May 2023. He was transfer-listed at the end of the 2023–24 season, before leaving the club by mutual consent on 30 June 2024.

=== Chester ===
On 2 July 2024, Rawlinson signed a one-year deal with Chester, a phoenix club of his first club, Chester City, who were now members of the National League North. In January 2025, he was appointed club captain following the departure of George Glendon. He made 36 appearances across the 2024–25 season, and was an unused substitute in the play-off final defeat to Scunthorpe United. He signed a new player-coach contract in June 2025. He was named as interim manager on 1 March 2026. He guided the club to a play-off finish at the end of the 2025–26 season. Chester were beaten in the play-offs and Phil Parkinson was appointed as the club's new manager on 4 May.

== Coaching career ==
Rawlinson joined Peterborough United as a first-team coach in July 2026, with manager Luke Williams emphasising his expected role in improving the club's set piece play.

On 19 September 2026, it was announced that Ryan Harley, assisted by Rawlinson, would take caretaker charge until a new manager was appointed following the sacking of Williams. The duo departed the club in October 2026 following the appointment of Robbie Savage as first-team manager.

== Personal life ==
Rawlinson married 27-year-old Georgia Panton at Mold, Flintshire in July 2021 following an eight-year relationship. At the time of his wedding he had an eight-year-old daughter from a previous relationship. He supports Everton, and family members support Wrexham.

== Career statistics ==
Appearances and goals by club, season and competition
Club	Season	League			National cup (Note: Includes FA Cup, Welsh Cup)		League cup (Note: Includes Football League Cup, Welsh League Cup)		Other		Total	
Club	Season	Division	Apps	Goals	Apps	Goals	Apps	Goals	Apps	Goals	Apps	Goals
Chester City	2009–10	Conference Premier	3	0	0	0	—		0	0	3	0
The New Saints	2010–11	Welsh Premier League	16	0	0	0	5	0	0	0	21	0
The New Saints	2011–12	Welsh Premier League	14	0	2	1	2	0	0	0	18	1
The New Saints	2012–13	Welsh Premier League	4	0	1	0	1	0	0	0	6	0
The New Saints	2013–14	Welsh Premier League	15	1	0	0	1	0	0	0	16	1
The New Saints	2014–15	Welsh Premier League	29	3	3	0	4	1	1 (Note: Appearance(s) in the UEFA Champions League qualifying.)	0	37	4
The New Saints	2015–16	Welsh Premier League	12	0	2	0	1	0	4	0	19	0
The New Saints	2016–17	Welsh Premier League	28	2	3	0	2	0	7 (Note: 4 appearances in the UEFA Champions League qualifying and 3 appearances in the Scottish Challenge Cup.)	0	40	2
The New Saints	2017–18	Welsh Premier League	24	3	1	0	2	0	8 (Note: 4 appearances in the UEFA Champions League qualifying and 4 appearances in the Scottish Challenge Cup.)	0	35	3
The New Saints	Total		142	9	12	1	18	1	20	0	192	11
Newtown (loan)	2012–13	Welsh Premier League	5	0	0	0	0	0	0	0	5	0
Port Vale	2018–19	EFL League Two	28	1	1	0	1	0	6 (Note: Appearance(s) in the EFL Trophy)	1	36	2
Notts County	2019–20	National League	34	1	3	0	—		3	1	40	2
Notts County	2020–21	National League	38	0	0	0	—		5 (Note: 3 appearances in the FA Trophy and 2 appearances in the play-offs)	0	43	0
Notts County	2021–22	National League	22	0	2	0	—		5 (Note: 4 appearances and 1 goal in the FA Trophy and 1 appearance in the play-offs)	1	29	1
Notts County	2022–23	National League	28	1	1	0	—		3 (Note: 1 appearance in the FA Trophy and 2 appearances in the play-offs)	0	32	1
Notts County	2023–24	EFL League Two	18	1	2	0	0	0	3	0	23	1
Notts County	Total		140	3	8	0	0	0	19	2	167	5
Chester	2024–25	National League North	35	1	2	1	—		1 (Note: Appearance(s) in the play-offs)	0	38	2
Chester	2025–26	National League North	4	1	1	0	—		1 (Note: Appearance(s) in Cheshire Senior Cup)	1	6	2
Chester	Total		39	2	3	1	0	0	2	1	44	4
Career total			357	15	24	2	18	1	48	4	447	22

== Managerial statistics ==
As of match played 29 April 2026

Team	From	To	Record					Ref
Team	From	To	G	W	D	L	Win %	Ref
Chester (interim)	1 March 2026	4 May 2026	11	7	2	2	63.64	
Total			11	7	2	2	63.64	

== Honours ==
The New Saints

- Welsh Premier League: 2011–12, 2012–13, 2013–14, 2014–15, 2015–16, 2016–17, 2017–18
- Welsh Cup: 2012, 2014, 2015, 2016; runner-up: 2017
- Welsh League Cup: 2011, 2015, 2016, 2017, 2018; runner-up: 2013

Notts County

- National League play-offs: 2023

Individual

- Welsh Premier League Team of the Season: 2017–18
- Notts County Player of the Year: 2019–20
