= Greg Draper =

New Zealand footballer

Personal information
- Full name: Gregory Alexander Draper
- Date of birth: 13 August 1989 (age 37)
- Place of birth: Chard, England
- Height: 1.91 m (6 ft 3 in)
- Position: Striker

Youth career
- –2006: Ferrymead Bays

Senior career*
Years	Team	Apps	(Gls)
2006–2007	Canterbury United	14	(4)
2007–2009	Wellington Phoenix	2	(0)
2009	Melbourne Knights	20	(8)
2009–2010	Team Wellington	16	(10)
2010–2011	Basingstoke Town	28	(15)
2011–2021	The New Saints	252	(163)
2021–2022	Guilsfield	9	(4)
2022–2025	The New Saints Reserves	8	(20)
2025	Newtown	10	(3)

International career^{‡}
- New Zealand U17
2007	New Zealand U20	5	(0)
2008–2012	New Zealand U23	6	(3)
2008	New Zealand	1	(0)
- * Club domestic league appearances and goals as of 20:09, 25 October 2025 (UTC) ‡ National team caps and goals as of 19:52, 24 March 2012 (UTC)

Gregory Alexander Draper (born 13 August 1989) is an English-born New Zealand footballer. He is also a coach with The New Saints under-21s.

== Early life ==
Draper was born and raised in Chard, Somerset, before his parents decided to emigrate to Christchurch in New Zealand when he was 12 years old.

== Club career ==
Having begun playing youth football at the age of ten, Draper joined Canterbury United shortly after moving to New Zealand. Having played for a number of clubs in Australia and New Zealand, Draper joined English non-league club Basingstoke Town in August 2010 and made his competitive debut for the club on 17 August against St. Albans.

In June 2011 he joined The New Saints making his debut for the club on 18 June in a pre-season friendly against Cliftonville. His competitive debut came on 30 June against the same team in a Europa League first qualifying round match, where he was a 74th-minute substitute. He scored his first competitive goal for his new club on 3 September in a Welsh Premier League game against Llanelli where he scored the only goal of the game.

His rich vein of form led to him being awarded the Welsh Premier League player of the month for February 2012. He finished the season as the club's top scorer and was awarded the club's player of the season award.

In the 2017–18 season, Draper won the Welsh Premier League golden boot for finishing as the league's top goalscorer with 22 goals. He repeated the feat the following year, scoring a career high 27 goals.

In May 2019 he signed a two-year contract extension with the club. Draper was released by the club at the end of the 2020–21 season.

In June 2021, Draper dropped down a division to join Cymru North side Guilsfield.

In July 2025 he returned to playing senior football, signing for Cymru North club Newtown.

== International career ==
He represented New Zealand national football team in the 2007 FIFA U-20 World Cup in Canada.

Draper was included in the New Zealand squad for the football tournament at the Summer Olympics in Beijing. He played in New Zealand's group matches against Brazil (0–5) and Belgium (0–1).

His senior international debut for the All Whites came in 2008 in a 2010 FIFA World Cup qualifier against Fiji.

He was called up March 2012 for the 2012 Olympic qualifiers and scored his first international goal in New Zealand's second group match against Tonga. Draper scored the only goal in the final to qualify New Zealand for the 2012 Olympic Games in Great Britain. He finished the qualifying tournament with three goals in four games. He was shortlisted for the final squad for the tournament.

== Career statistics ==
=== Club ===
Club	Season	League			Cup		League Cup		Continental		Other		Total	
Club	Season	Division	Apps	Goals	Apps	Goals	Apps	Goals	Apps	Goals	Apps	Goals	Apps	Goals
Canterbury United	2006–07	NZ Premiership	7	4	—		—		—		—		7	4
Wellington Phoenix	2007–08	A-League	2	0	—		—		—		—		2	0
Wellington Phoenix	2008–09	A-League	0	0	—		—		—		—		0	0
Wellington Phoenix	Total		2	0	0	0	0	0	0	0	0	0	2	0
Melbourne Knights	2009	Victorian Premier League	22	7	—		—		—		—			
Team Wellington	2009–10	NZ Premiership	14	8	—		—		—		2 (Note: Appearances in New Zealand Football Championship play-offs)	2	16	10
Basingstoke Town	2010–11	Football Conference South	35	14					—					
The New Saints	2011–12	Welsh Premier League	29	22	5	5	—		3 (Note: Appearances in UEFA Europa League)	0	—			
The New Saints	2012–13	Welsh Premier League	20	5	1	0	—		1 (Note: Appearances in UEFA Champions League)	0	—			
The New Saints	2013–14	Welsh Premier League	26	16	1	2	—		1	0	—			
The New Saints	2014–15	Welsh Premier League	25	17	1	0	—		2	0	—			
The New Saints	2015–16	Welsh Premier League	21	9	3	2	3	7	4	0	—			
The New Saints	2016–17	Welsh Premier League	31	16	3	2	2	1	3	1	3 (Note: Appearances in Scottish Challenge Cup)	3		
The New Saints	2017–18	Welsh Premier League	31	23	1	0	3	2	3	0	4	2		
The New Saints	2018–19	Welsh Premier League	31	23	1	0	3	2	4 (Note: One appearance in UEFA Champions League; three appearances in UEFA Europa League)	0	1	0		
The New Saints	2019–20	Cymru Premier	25	18	2	3	1	0	5 (Note: Four appearances; one goal in UEFA Champions League; one appearance in UEFA Europa League)	1	1	0		
The New Saints	2020–21	Cymru Premier	29	14	0	0	0	0	1	0	0	0		
The New Saints	Total		303	163	18	14	12	12	27	2	9	5	369	196
Guilsfield	2021–22	Cymru North	9	4	0	0	1	0	—		—		10	4
Newtown	2025–26	Cymru North	1	0	0	0	1	0	—		—		2	0
Career total														

== Honours ==
The New Saints

- Welsh Premier League (9): 2011–12, 2012–13, 2013–14, 2014–15, 2015–16, 2016–17, 2017–18, 2018–19
- Welsh Cup (5): 2011–12, 2013–14, 2014–15, 2015–16, 2018–19
- Welsh League Cup (4): 2014–15, 2015–16, 2016–17, 2017–18

Individual

- Welsh Premier League Team of the Year: 2011–12, 2017–18
- Welsh Premier League Golden Boot (2): 2017–18, 2018–19
