= Simon Spender =

Welsh footballer

Personal information
- Full name: Simon Spender
- Date of birth: 15 November 1985 (age 40)
- Place of birth: Mold, Wales
- Position: Defender

Youth career
- 2002–2004: Wrexham

Senior career*
Years	Team	Apps	(Gls)
2004–2009	Wrexham	110	(5)
2009	→ Barrow (loan)	12	(0)
2009–2011	Barrow	87	(2)
2011–2021	The New Saints	202	(5)
2025	Newtown	3	(0)
Total		414	(12)

International career
2004–2008	Wales U21	6	(0)
- * Club domestic league appearances and goals

Simon Spender (born 15 November 1985) is a Welsh football coach and former professional footballer who is an academy coach at The New Saints.

== Career ==
Born in Mold, Flintshire, Spender came up through the youth system at Wrexham and made his debut in a 0–0 draw with Plymouth Argyle in March 2004. He made six appearances in the 2003–04 season, impressing in a 2–1 win over Luton Town. He made 19 appearances in the 2004–05 season and was rewarded with his first professional contract in May 2005. Spender made a further 21 appearances in the 2005–06 season and was given a new contract in summer of 2006. He established himself as the first-choice right-back and by the end of the 2007–08 season had made over 100 appearances for Wrexham. Spender missed three months of the 2008–09 season with a broken elbow and in March 2009, joined Barrow on loan for the remainder of the season, helping them to avoid relegation. He was not offered a contract by Wrexham at the end of the season, and signed a permanent two-year contract with Barrow.

Spender spent two seasons with Barrow. In his first year at the club he won the FA Trophy and made the most appearances for the club of any player that season. The following year Spender remained a regular and helped Barrow avoid relegation yet again. In May 2011 he was offered a new contract by Barrow, but chose to take up the option of professional football at The New Saints in the Welsh Premier League. His competitive debut for the club took place on 30 June 2011 against Cliftonville in a UEFA Europa League first qualifying round match.

Spender retired in June 2021 and moved into a coaching role at The New Saints.

He played for The New Saints reserves team in the 2022–23 and 2023–24 season, as well as making a further first team appearance for the club in the Welsh League Cup in the 2024–25 season, playing nine minutes in a match against Flint Town United.

In the 2025–26 season he returned to playing first team football, joining Cymru North team Newtown. He made his debut for the club in a CWFA Senior Cup match, before also appearing for the team in league matches. He went on to make five appearances for the club,

== Honours ==
The New Saints

- Welsh Premier League: 2011–12, 2012–13, 2013–14, 2014–15, 2015–16, 2016–17
- Welsh Cup: 2011–12, 2013–14, 2014–15, 2015–16
- Welsh League Cup: 2014–15, 2015–16, 2016–17, 2017–18

Barrow

- FA Trophy: 2009-10

Individual

- Welsh Premier League Team of the Year: 2014–15, 2015–16, 2016–17
