= Craig Harrison (footballer) =

English footballer and manager

Personal information
- Full name: Craig Harrison
- Date of birth: 10 November 1977 (age 49)
- Place of birth: Gateshead, England
- Height: 1.88 m (6 ft 2 in)
- Position: Defender

Team information
- Current team: The New Saints (manager)

Youth career
- Middlesbrough

Senior career*
Years	Team	Apps	(Gls)
1996–2000	Middlesbrough	32	(0)
1999	→ Preston North End (loan)	6	(0)
2000	→ Crystal Palace (loan)	4	(0)
2000–2003	Crystal Palace	34	(0)
Total		76	(0)

Managerial career
- 2008–2011: Airbus UK Broughton
- 2011–2017: The New Saints
- 2017–2018: Hartlepool United
- 2018: Bangor City
- 2021–2022: Connah's Quay Nomads
- 2022–: The New Saints
- * Club domestic league appearances and goals

Craig Harrison (born 10 November 1977) is an English professional football manager and former player who manages Cymru Premier side The New Saints.

In his seven-year playing career, in which he played in defence, he played for Middlesbrough, Preston North End and Crystal Palace.

From 2008, until his departure in 2011, he was the manager of Airbus UK Broughton. He then joined The New Saints as their new manager that same year. In June 2017, Harrison was appointed as the manager of Hartlepool United.

== Early life ==
Harrison was born in Gateshead, Tyne and Wear.

== Playing career ==
He is a product of the youth system at Middlesbrough, where he made a number of appearances during the 1997–98 promotion season under Bryan Robson. He was unfortunate not to play in the 1998 League Cup final, having been Boro's left-back in the three league games immediately before the final. However, he did play the full match as the club sealed promotion with a 4–1 final day win over Oxford United. He also started the club's first game back in the Premier League. Whilst at the club he had loan spells with Preston North End in 1999 and Crystal Palace in August 2000.

He joined Crystal Palace permanently the following month, and over the next two years made 34 league appearances for the club. In January 2002, he suffered a double compound fracture in his left leg whilst playing for the club's reserves against Reading. After nineteen months in rehabilitation and three operations, he subsequently retired from professional football in 2003. After retirement he battled depression and worked on property renovation and resale.

== Managerial career ==
=== Airbus UK Broughton ===
In the spring of 2008, he was appointed assistant manager of Welsh Premier League side Airbus UK Broughton after a chance meeting with the then manager Gareth Owen. In the summer of 2008, Harrison was appointed manager. In January 2010, he announced he was registering himself as a player for the club. He subsequently became director of football at the club.

=== The New Saints ===
In December 2011, Harrison was unveiled as director of football and manager of The New Saints

In his first season, he oversaw TNS being crowned the 2011–12 Welsh Premier League Champions, as well as the winning the Welsh Cup. He won the Welsh Premier League again in the 2013–2014 season, before securing the Welsh Premier League for the third year running and becoming the first team in Europe to win their domestic league.

In May 2017, he was named Welsh Premier League manager of the season, having led the side to their sixth successive Welsh Premier League title, as well as the Welsh League Cup and breaking Ajax's 44-year-old world record for the longest winning streak in top-flight football.

=== Hartlepool United ===
On 26 May 2017, Harrison was appointed as manager of newly relegated National League club Hartlepool United.

Harrison was awarded the National League's manager of the month award for October 2017. Following only one victory since late November, Harrison left his position as manager in February 2018.

=== Bangor City ===
On 23 May 2018, Harrison was appointed as manager of Bangor City following their relegation from the Welsh Premier League after failing to obtain a tier one license. On 19 October the same year he left the club to go to Connah's Quay as first team coach. He stated a desire to return to full-time work as the key factor behind his decision.

=== Connah's Quay Nomads ===
In October 2018, Harrison joined the coaching staff at Connah's Quay Nomads following his departure from Bangor City.

In September 2021, Harrison was appointed manager of Connah's Quay following the resignation of Andy Morrison.

=== Return to The New Saints ===
In August 2022 he returned to The New Saints as Head Coach.

== Managerial statistics ==
As of match played 10 October 2026

Managerial record by team and tenure
Team	Nat	From	To	Record							
Team	Nat	From	To	G	W	D	L	GF	GA	GD	Win %
Airbus UK Broughton	(Wales)	2 July 2008	29 December 2011	143	48	33	62	213	229	−16	33.57
The New Saints	(Wales)	30 December 2011	26 May 2017	238	175	34	29	616	182	+434	73.53
Hartlepool United	(England)	26 May 2017	21 February 2018	36	10	10	16	37	57	−20	27.78
Bangor City	(Wales)	30 May 2018	19 October 2018	11	7	1	3	21	11	+10	63.64
Connah's Quay Nomads	(Wales)	29 September 2021	4 August 2022	28	14	9	5	41	27	+14	50.00
The New Saints	(Wales)	4 August 2022	Present	207	156	17	34	603	167	+436	75.36
Total				663	410	104	149	1,531	673	+858	61.84

== Honours ==
=== As a manager ===
TNS

- Welsh Premier League: 2011–12, 2012–13, 2013–14, 2014–15, 2015–16, 2016–17, 2022–23, 2023–24, 2024-25, 2025–26
- Welsh Cup: 2011–12, 2013–14, 2014–15, 2015–16, 2022-23, 2024–25
- Welsh League Cup: 2014–15, 2015–16, 2016–17, 2023–24, 2024-25

Connah's Quay Nomads

- Welsh League Cup: 2021-22
