= 2020–21 Cymru Premier =

Cymru Premier Uwch Gynghrair Cymru
- Season: 2020–21
- Dates: 12 September 2020 – 29 May 2021
- Champions: Connah's Quay Nomads
- Relegated: No relegation
- Champions League: Connah's Quay Nomads
- Europa Conference League: The New Saints; Bala Town; Newtown
- Matches: 192
- Goals: 600 (3.13 per match)
- Top goalscorer: Chris Venables (24 goals)
- Biggest home win: The New Saints 10–0 Flint Town (3 October 2020)
- Biggest away win: Cefn Druids 0–7 Newtown (30 April 2021)
- Highest scoring: The New Saints 10–0 Flint Town (3 October 2020)
- All statistics correct as of 26 September.

The 2020–21 Cymru Premier (Welsh: Uwch Gynghrair Cymru 2020–21) (known as the JD Cymru Premier for sponsorship reasons) was the 29th season of the Cymru Premier (formerly known as the Welsh Premier League), the highest football league within Wales since its establishment in 1992. Connah's Quay Nomads were the defending champions. Teams played each other twice on a home and away basis, before the league split into two groups after phase 1 matches were completed.

COVID-19 restrictions were put in place by the FAW. Starting Monday 10 August 2020, clubs could train in groups of 15 and contact training was allowed at all levels of football. However, competitive and exhibition matches were not allowed to take place at this time.

On 21 August 2020, The Football Association of Wales received confirmation that the JD Cymru Premier has been granted elite athletic status by the Welsh Government, meaning that the 2020–21 season could commence on 11 September 2020.

== Teams ==
Twelve teams competed in the league – the top ten teams from the previous season, and one team each promoted from the second tier, the Cymru North and Cymru South.

The two bottom placed teams from the 2019–20 season, Airbus UK Broughton and Carmarthen Town, were relegated to the Cymru North and the Cymru South respectively for the 2020–21 season.

Flint Town United, runners-up of the Cymru North were promoted to the league due to champions Prestatyn Town's failure to secure a Tier 1 license. Similarly, Haverfordwest County, runners-up of the Cymru South, were also promoted due to champions Swansea University's failure to secure a Tier 1 license.

=== Stadia and locations ===
Locations of the 2020–21 Cymru Premier teams

Team	Location	Stadium	Capacity
Aberystwyth Town	Aberystwyth	Park Avenue	5,000
Bala Town	Bala	Maes Tegid	3,000
Barry Town United	Barry	Jenner Park Stadium	3,500
Caernarfon Town	Caernarfon	The Oval	3,000
Cardiff Metropolitan University	Cyncoed	Cyncoed Campus	1,620
Cefn Druids	Rhosymedre	The Rock	3,000
Connah's Quay Nomads	Connah's Quay	Deeside Stadium	1,500
Flint Town United	Flint	Cae-y-Castell	1,000
Haverfordwest County	Haverfordwest	Bridge Meadow Stadium	2,100
Newtown	Newtown	Latham Park	5,000
Penybont	Bridgend	Bryntirion Park	3,000
The New Saints	(England) Oswestry	Park Hall	2,034

=== Personnel and kits ===
Team	Head coach	Captain	Kit manufacturer	Front shirt sponsor
Aberystwyth Town	(Wales) Gavin Allen	(Wales) Marc Williams	Acerbis	Aberystwyth University
Bala Town	(England) Colin Caton	(Wales) Chris Venables	Macron	Aykroyd's
Barry Town United	(Wales) Gavin Chesterfield	(Wales) Jordan Cotterill	Macron	RIM Motors
Caernarfon Town	(Wales) Huw Griffiths	(England) Gareth Edwards	Surridge Sports	Gofal Bro Cyf, Parc Gwêl y Fenai
Cardiff Metropolitan University	(Wales) Christian Edwards	(England) Bradley Woolridge	Errea	Cardiff Metropolitan University
Cefn Druids	(Wales) Jason Starkey (caretaker)	(England) Michael Jones	Errea	Wrexham Lager
Connah's Quay Nomads	(Scotland) Andy Morrison	(England) George Horan	Nike	Mind
Flint Town United	(Wales) Neil Gibson	(England) Richie Faulkes	Macron	Essity
Haverfordwest County	(Wales) Wayne Jones	(Wales) Sean Pemberton	Joma	West Wales Properties
Newtown	(Scotland) Chris Hughes	(Wales) Craig T. Williams	Errea	Control Techniques
Penybont	(Wales) Rhys Griffiths	(Wales) Rhys Wilson	Macron	Nathaniel House of Cars
The New Saints	(Australia) Anthony Limbrick	(England) Paul Harrison	Legea	SiFi Networks

== League table ==
Pos	Team	Pld	W	D	L	GF	GA	GD	Pts	Qualification (Note: Teams play each other twice (22 matches), before the league splits into two groups (the top six and the bottom six) for the last 10 matches. Due to the cancellation of Cymru North and South seasons, there is no promotion or relegation.)
1	Connah's Quay Nomads (C)	32	25	4	3	70	20	+50	79	Qualification for the Champions League first qualifying round
2	The New Saints	32	24	5	3	84	17	+67	77	Qualification for the Europa Conference League first qualifying round
3	Bala Town	32	18	6	8	67	42	+25	60	Qualification for the Europa Conference League first qualifying round
4	Penybont	32	13	7	12	42	40	+2	46	Qualification for the Europa Conference League play-offs
5	Barry Town United	32	13	4	15	42	53	−11	43	Qualification for the Europa Conference League play-offs
6	Caernarfon Town	32	10	7	15	43	67	−24	37	Qualification for the Europa Conference League play-offs
7	Newtown (O)	32	12	6	14	57	53	+4	42	Qualification for the Europa Conference League play-offs
8	Cardiff Metropolitan University	32	11	7	14	47	46	+1	40	
9	Haverfordwest County	32	10	7	15	38	56	−18	37	
10	Aberystwyth Town	32	8	9	15	47	53	−6	33	
11	Flint Town United	32	10	2	20	38	58	−20	32	
12	Cefn Druids	32	4	4	24	25	95	−70	16	

Source: Cymru Premier table
Rules for classification: 1) Points; 2) Goal difference; 3) Head-to-head points; 4) Goals scored; 5) Matches won.
(C) Champions; (O) Play-off winners

== Results ==
12 September 2020 - 31 May 2021

=== Matches 1–22 ===
Home \ Away	ABE	BAL	BAR	CAE	CMU	CDR	CQN	FTU	HAV	NTW	PYB	TNS
Aberystwyth Town	—	1–2	1–2	1–2	2–3	3–1	1–3	3–1	2–1	1–0	1–1	2–2
Bala Town	5–2	—	4–0	1–2	4–1	2–1	1–3	5–0	1–2	3–1	4–1	1–1
Barry Town United	1–0	6–2	—	3–1	1–0	4–1	0–0	6–3	2–1	0–0	0–1	0–3
Caernarfon Town	2–2	1–1	2–0	—	3–2	1–2	1–2	2–1	1–4	1–1	1–1	0–4
Cardiff Metropolitan University	1–1	1–1	1–2	0–3	—	0–0	1–2	2–1	0–0	2–1	0–1	0–1
Cefn Druids	0–4	1–3	0–1	1–2	1–1	—	0–5	1–2	4–1	2–4	0–2	0–4
Connah's Quay Nomads	2–0	1–1	3–1	3–1	3–1	2–1	—	2–0	2–0	2–1	1–0	2–0
Flint Town United	3–0	1–2	0–1	0–2	0–1	1–2	0–1	—	0–2	1–0	0–1	0–6
Haverfordwest County	2–0	1–1	2–1	1–1	1–0	1–1	1–4	0–3	—	2–2	0–4	2–1
Newtown	1–1	0–2	1–1	2–3	4–1	4–1	1–5	3–2	0–3	—	2–0	0–4
Penybont	1–1	1–5	1–0	6–0	1–0	1–1	0–0	1–2	2–0	2–1	—	0–4
The New Saints	4–1	0–0	2–1	4–1	2–0	5–0	1–0	10–0	3–2	2–0	2–1	—

Source: Cymru Premier
Legend: Blue = home team win; Yellow = draw; Red = away team win.
- On 17 August 2020 the FAW announced that all official domestic match balls will be sponsored by Macron
- Welsh television channel S4C will broadcast certain matches

=== Matches 23–32 ===
==== Top six ====
Home \ Away	BAL	BAR	CAE	CQN	PYB	TNS
Bala Town	—	1–0	5–2	2–1	1–0	0–1
Barry Town United	1–4	—	3–2	1–2	3–3	0–6
Caernarfon Town	3–0	0–1	—	1–6	2–2	0–2
Connah's Quay Nomads	2–0	1–0	4–0	—	0–2	0–0
Penybont	2–3	2–0	2–0	0–2	—	0–3
The New Saints	2–0	3–0	0–0	1–4	1–0	—

Source: Cymru Premier
Legend: Blue = home team win; Yellow = draw; Red = away team win.

==== Bottom six ====
Home \ Away	ABE	CMU	CDR	FTU	HAV	NTW
Aberystwyth Town	—	1–1	5–1	0–1	2–2	1–2
Cardiff Metropolitan University	5–1	—	6–0	2–1	6–1	2–2
Cefn Druids	0–3	1–2	—	0–6	2–1	0–7
Flint Town United	0–0	2–0	5–0	—	2–0	0–2
Haverfordwest County	1–0	0–2	2–0	0–0	—	1–2
Newtown	0–4	2–3	5–0	1–0	5–1	—

Source: Cymru Premier
Legend: Blue = home team win; Yellow = draw; Red = away team win.

== UEFA Europa Conference League play-offs ==
Teams that finished in positions fourth to seventh at the end of the regular season participated in play-offs to determine the third participant to enter the Europa Conference League first qualifying round.

=== Semi-finals ===
22 May 2021
17:15

Barry Town	1–3	Caernarfon Town
Edwards 44' (o.g.)	Report	Hayes 41', 50'; Bickerstaff 90+5'

Jenner Park, Barry
Referee: Simon Lee Evans
23 May 2021
12:15

Penybont	0–1	Newtown
	Report	Breese 86'

The SDM Glass Stadium, Bridgend
Referee: Iwan Arwel Griffith

=== Final ===
29 May 2021
12:00

Caernarfon Town	3–5	Newtown
Kenny 18'; D. Thomas 59', 74'	Report	Rushton 39' (pen.); Mwandwe 45'; Davies 80', 82'; Breese 86'

The Oval, Caernarfon
Referee: Huw Jones

== Season statistics ==
=== Top scorers ===
Rank	Player	Club	Goals
1	(Wales) Chris Venables	Bala Town	24
2	(England) Michael Wilde	Connah's Quay Nomads	18
3	(New Zealand) Greg Draper	The New Saints	14
4	(Wales) Will Evans	Bala Town	13
4	(England) Ollie Hulbert	Cardiff Met	13
4	(Wales) Eliot Evans	Cardiff Met	13

=== Monthly awards ===
Month	Manager of the Month		Player of the Month	
Month	Manager	Club	Player	Club
October	(Wales) Scott Ruscoe	The New Saints	(England) Chris Venables	Bala Town
November	(Wales) Scott Ruscoe	The New Saints	(Wales) Will Evans	Bala Town
December	(Scotland) Andy Morrison	Connah's Quay	(Wales) Lewis Harling	Penybont
March	(Scotland) Andy Morrison	Connah's Quay	(England) George Horan	Connah's Quay
April	(Scotland) Andy Morrison	Connah's Quay	(England) Michael Wilde	Connah's Quay

=== Annual awards ===
Award	Winner	Club
Manager of the Season	(Scotland) Andy Morrison	Connah's Quay Nomads
Player of the Season	(England) Michael Wilde	Connah's Quay Nomads
Young Player of the Season	(Wales) Mael Davies	Penybont
Goal of the Season	(England) Sameron Dool	Connah's Quay Nomads
Save of the Season	(Wales) Connor Roberts	Aberystwyth Town

Team of the Season
Goalkeeper	(England) Oliver Byrne (Connah's Quay Nomads)			
Defenders	(England) John Disney (Connah's Quay Nomads)	(England) Ryan Astles (The New Saints)	(England) George Horan (Connah's Quay Nomads)	(Wales) Kane Owen (Penybont)
Midfielders	(England) Callum Morris (Connah's Quay Nomads)	(England) Ryan Brobbel (The New Saints)	(Poland) Adrian Cieślewicz (The New Saints)	(Wales) Danny Davies (Connah's Quay Nomads)
Forwards	(England) Chris Venables (Bala Town)		(England) Michael Wilde (Connah's Quay Nomads)	
