= 2015–16 Welsh Premier League =

Welsh Premier League
- Season: 2015–16
- Champions: The New Saints (10th title)
- Relegated: Port Talbot Town; Haverfordwest County
- Champions League: The New Saints
- Europa League: Bala Town; Llandudno; Connah's Quay Nomads
- Matches: 180
- Goals: 529 (2.94 per match)
- Top goalscorer: (England) Chris Venables (20)
- Biggest home win: Connah's Quay Nomads 5–0 Port Talbot Town (12 December 2015); The New Saints 5–0 Airbus UK Broughton (27 February 2016); Rhyl 5–0 Port Talbot Town (9 April 2016)
- Biggest away win: Newtown 0–6 The New Saints (13 February 2016)
- Longest unbeaten run: The New Saints (21)
- All statistics correct as of 9 April 2016.

The 2015–16 Welsh Premier League (known as the Dafabet Welsh Premier League for sponsorship reasons) was the 24th season of the Welsh Premier League, the highest football league within Wales since its establishment in 1992. The New Saints were the defending champions.

Teams played each other twice on a home and away basis, before the league was split into two groups at the end of January 2016 – the top six and the bottom six.

== Teams ==
Location of the 2015-16 Welsh Premier League clubs

Cefn Druids and Prestatyn Town were relegated out of the Welsh Premier League the previous season, while Llandudno were promoted as winners of the Cymru Alliance and Haverfordwest County were promoted as winners of Welsh Football League Division One. It will be Llandudno's debut campaign in the league.

=== Stadia and locations ===
Team	Location	Stadium	Capacity
Aberystwyth Town	Aberystwyth	Park Avenue	5,000
Airbus UK Broughton	Broughton	The Airfield	1,600
Bala Town	Bala	Maes Tegid	3,000
Bangor City	Bangor	Nantporth	3,000
Carmarthen Town	Carmarthen	Richmond Park	3,000
Connah's Quay Nomads	Connah's Quay	Deeside Stadium	1,500
Haverfordwest County	Haverfordwest	Bridge Meadow Stadium	2,000
Llandudno	Llandudno	Park MBi Maesdu	1,013
Newtown	Newtown	Latham Park	5,000
Port Talbot Town	Port Talbot	Victoria Road	6,000
Rhyl	Rhyl	The Corbett Sports Stadium	3,000
The New Saints	Oswestry	Park Hall	2,000

=== Personnel and kits ===
Team	Head coach	Captain	Kit manufacturer	Shirt sponsors
Aberystwyth	(Wales) Ian Hughes	(Wales) Stuart Jones	Nike	Cambrian Tyres
Airbus UK	(England) Andy Preece	(England) Andy Jones	Macron	Gardner Aerospace
Bala	(Wales) Colin Caton	(Northern Ireland) Conall Murtagh	Joma	Aykroyd's
Bangor	(Wales) Neville Powell	(Wales) Leon Clowes	Macron	Dafydd Hardy (home) Anglesey Sea Zoo (away)
Carmarthen	(Wales) Mark Aizlewood	(Wales) Kyle Bassett	Macron	Jeff White (home) Natwest Cymru (away)
Connah's Quay Nomads	(Scotland) Andy Morrison	(England) George Horan	Macron	Driving Force
Haverfordwest County	(Wales) David Hughes	(Wales) Dale Griffiths	Kappa	West Wales Properties.co.uk
Llandudno	(Wales) Alan Morgan	(Wales) Tom Dix	Adidas	The UPVC Outlet
Newtown	(Wales) Chris Hughes	(England) Matthew Cook	Givova	NEO/Elephant & Castle Hotel
Port Talbot	(Wales) Andy Dyer	(Wales) Liam McCreesh	Macron	Blanco's
Rhyl	(Wales) Gareth Owen	(England) Dean Keates	Adidas	VanTruck
TNS	(Wales) Carl Darlington	(England) Paul Harrison	Legea	PlanetHippo

== League table ==
Pos	Team	Pld	W	D	L	GF	GA	GD	Pts	Qualification or relegation (Note: Teams played each other twice (22 matches), before the league was split into two groups (the top six and the bottom six) for the last 10 matches.)
1	The New Saints (C)	32	18	10	4	72	24	+48	64	Qualification for the Champions League first qualifying round (Note: The New Saints qualified for the Europa League first qualifying round by winning the 2015–16 Welsh Cup. However, since they already qualified for European competition based on their league position, the spot awarded to the cup winners was passed down the league.)
2	Bala Town	32	15	12	5	48	27	+21	57	Qualification for the Europa League first qualifying round
3	Llandudno	32	15	7	10	53	46	+7	52	Qualification for the Europa League first qualifying round
4	Connah's Quay Nomads (O)	32	15	3	14	50	42	+8	48	Qualification for the European competition play-offs (Note: Teams played for a spot in the Europa League first qualifying round.)
5	Newtown	32	11	9	12	46	54	−8	42	Qualification for the European competition play-offs
6	Airbus UK Broughton	32	12	6	14	46	55	−9	42	Qualification for the European competition play-offs
7	Carmarthen Town	32	14	5	13	45	52	−7	47	Qualification for the European competition play-offs
8	Aberystwyth Town	32	13	7	12	51	47	+4	46	
9	Bangor City	32	13	6	13	49	52	−3	45	
10	Port Talbot Town (R)	32	10	9	13	39	56	−17	39	Relegation to Welsh Division One (Note: Rhyl were spared from relegation as Port Talbot Town failed to obtain a FAW domestic licence.)
11	Rhyl	32	5	12	15	36	50	−14	27	
12	Haverfordwest County (R)	32	5	6	21	27	57	−30	21	Relegation to Welsh Division One

Source: Welsh Premier League, Soccerway
Rules for classification: 1) Points; 2) Goal difference; 3) Goals scored; 4) Matches won; 5) Play-off.
(C) Champions; (O) Play-off winners; (R) Relegated

== Results ==
Teams played each other twice on a home and away basis, before the league split into two groups – the top six and the bottom six.

=== Matches 1–22 ===
Home \ Away	ABE	AIR	BAL	BAN	CMR	CQN	HAV	LND	NTW	PTA	RHL	TNS
Aberystwyth Town		1–2	1–1	4–0	1–2	1–1	1–2	1–4	1–2	1–3	3–1	0–4
Airbus UK Broughton	2–0		2–0	1–4	5–1	3–2	2–1	0–2	1–4	2–0	0–0	1–1
Bala Town	0–1	2–1		3–0	2–1	2–0	3–2	3–0	1–0	5–2	0–0	0–0
Bangor City	2–3	3–0	1–1		1–2	2–1	2–1	0–3	3–0	1–2	1–0	0–2
Carmarthen Town	0–3	2–3	0–0	2–1		1–0	4–1	2–4	0–2	0–0	1–1	1–6
Connah's Quay Nomads	1–2	1–1	2–1	1–3	4–0		2–1	2–1	0–2	5–0	3–1	2–0
Haverfordwest County	0–1	0–1	0–2	2–1	0–0	0–2		2–0	0–1	1–2	1–1	0–4
Llandudno	3–2	1–0	0–0	1–2	1–2	1–0	1–0		0–2	1–1	1–0	3–4
Newtown	0–0	0–3	2–3	0–3	4–1	4–2	3–0	0–3		1–1	1–2	2–2
Port Talbot Town	4–2	2–2	0–0	2–0	0–3	0–4	1–2	1–4	1–1		0–3	0–1
Rhyl	2–2	1–0	1–3	1–1	1–4	1–2	1–2	1–1	1–1	0–1		0–0
The New Saints	1–1	4–0	1–1	2–0	2–0	2–0	2–0	1–1	4–1	3–1	2–2	

Source: Welsh Premier League
Legend: Blue = home team win; Yellow = draw; Red = away team win.

=== Matches 23–32 ===
Top six

Home \ Away	AIR	BAL	CQN	LND	NTW	TNS
Airbus UK Broughton		0–3	0–1	3–4	2–2	3–2
Bala Town	3–1		3–1	0–0	1–1	0–0
Connah's Quay Nomads	2–1	0–1		2–3	1–0	2–1
Llandudno	1–1	3–2	1–2		3–2	1–5
Newtown	0–3	2–2	3–2	1–1		0–6
The New Saints	5–0	2–0	0–0	2–0	1–2	

Source: Welsh Premier League
Legend: Blue = home team win; Yellow = draw; Red = away team win.

Bottom six

Home \ Away	ABE	BAN	CMR	HAV	PTA	RHL
Aberystwyth Town		4–0	2–4	3–1	1–0	3–1
Bangor City	0–0		2–2	5–2	0–2	4–3
Carmarthen Town	1–0	0–1		1–0	2–3	2–0
Haverfordwest County	1–3	1–1	1–2		1–1	1–1
Port Talbot Town	2–2	1–1	0–2	2–0		4–0
Rhyl	0–1	3–4	1–0	1–1	5–0	

Source: Welsh Premier League
Legend: Blue = home team win; Yellow = draw; Red = away team win.

== UEFA Europa League play-offs ==
Teams who finished in positions fourth to seventh at the end of the regular season participated in play-offs to determine the third participant for the 2016–17 UEFA Europa League, who will qualify for the first qualifying round.

=== Semi-finals ===
7 May 2016
17:15 BST

Newtown	1–2	Airbus UK Broughton
Sutton 36'	Report	McGinn 14' (pen.), 38' (pen.)

Latham Park, Newtown
Attendance: 221
Referee: Lee Evans

8 May 2016
15:30 BST

Connah's Quay Nomads	2–0	Carmarthen Town
Rushton 5'; Baynes 63'	Report

Deeside Stadium, Connah's Quay
Attendance: 708
Referee: Bryn Markham-Jones

=== Final ===
14 May 2016
17:15 BST

Connah's Quay Nomads	1–0	Airbus UK Broughton
Baynes 79'	Soccerway; BBC Sport

Deeside Stadium, Connah's Quay
Attendance: 904
Referee: Dean John
