= Seamus Heath =

Northern Irish footballer and manager (born 1961)

Personal information
- Full name: Seamus Martin James Paul Heath
- Date of birth: 6 December 1961 (age 64)
- Place of birth: Belfast, Northern Ireland
- Position: Midfielder

Youth career
- Cromac Albion

Senior career*
Years	Team	Apps	(Gls)
1979–1982	Luton Town	0	(0)
1982	→ Lincoln City (loan)	7	(0)
1983–1984	Wrexham	32	(1)
1984–1986	Tranmere Rovers	17	(0)
1986	Portadown	4	(1)
1986–?	Bollklubben-46	?	(?)
1989–1990	Glentoran	11	(0)
1990	Bollklubben-46	?	(?)
1990–1992	Glentoran	28	(0)
1992–1994	Distillery	43	(0)
1994–1995	Derry City	9	(0)
1995–1996	Cliftonville	12	(0)

Managerial career
- 2005: Northern Ireland U19 (assistant)
- 2006–2007: Kilmore Recreation
- 2016–2017: Annagh United (youth)
- 2017–2018: Knockbreda (youth)
- 2018: Aberystwyth Town
- * Club domestic league appearances and goals

Seamus Heath (born 6 December 1961) is a Northern Irish former association football midfielder and coach who was most recently manager of Welsh Premier League club Aberystwyth Town.

Heath was an archetypal journeyman appearing for several clubs during the course of his career. He subsequently carved out a successful career in coaching.

== Playing career ==
Heath began his career at amateur club Cromac Albion where for a time he roomed with future Northern Ireland international Mal Donaghy. In April 1979 he joined Football League side Luton Town although Heath did not make any league appearances for the club and in April 1982 joined Lincoln City on loan. He spent the 1983–84 season at Wrexham and then played for Tranmere Rovers before returning to Northern Ireland with Portadown in October 1986.

Soon afterwards Heath moved to Finland to play for Bollklubben-46 and subsequently played for a number of other clubs in the country. In October 1989 he joined Glentoran although the following summer Heath returned to Bollklubben-46. He rejoined Glentoran in October 1990. Heath signed for Distillery in July 1992. He moved to League of Ireland side Derry City in August 1994. He returned to the Irish Football League with Cliftonville in August 1995.

== Coaching ==
Heath served as youth development officer at Glenavon and until 2005 combined this with a wider role as one of 23 Irish Football Association (IFA) youth development officers. In this capacity he also served as assistant manager of the Northern Ireland under-19 team. In January 2006 Heath was appointed manager of Kilmore Recreation.

Heath would return to the IFA around 2007 as a "Grassroots Development Officer" for the Down district. As of 2011 Heath remains in position with the IFA. He has also turned out for the Northern Ireland over 45s in veterans matches.

On 28 March 2018, Heath was announced as manager of Welsh club Aberystwyth Town due to former manager Neville Powell's pro licence expiring.
