= 2016–17 Welsh Premier League =

Welsh Premier League
- Season: 2016–17
- Dates: 12 August 2016 – 22 April 2017
- Champions: The New Saints (11th title)
- Relegated: Rhyl; Airbus UK Broughton
- Champions League: The New Saints
- Europa League: Connah's Quay Nomads; Bala Town; Bangor City
- Matches: 192
- Goals: 587 (3.06 per match)
- Biggest home win: The New Saints 10–0 Rhyl (28 August 2016)
- Biggest away win: Airbus UK Broughton 0–7 Newtown (14 April 2017)
- Highest scoring: The New Saints 10–0 Rhyl (28 August 2016); Bala Town 4–6 The New Saints (22 April 2017)

The 2016–17 Welsh Premier League (known as the Dafabet Welsh Premier League for sponsorship reasons) was the 25th season of the Welsh Premier League, the highest football league within Wales since its establishment in 1992. The New Saints are the defending champions. The fixtures were announced on 22 June 2016. The season began on 12 August 2016 and ended on 22 April 2017; the Europa League play-offs will followed afterwards.

Teams played each other twice on a home and away basis, before the league split into two groups at the end of January 2017 – the top six and the bottom six.

On 30 December 2016, The New Saints broke Ajax's 44-year-old world record for the longest winning streak in top-flight football with their 27th consecutive win in all competitions. Their record run of 27 wins came to an end with a 3–3 draw on 14 January 2017.

On 4 March 2017, The New Saints defeated Bangor 4–0 to clinch their sixth straight Welsh Premier League title and eleventh Welsh league title overall.

This was the final season the league was sponsored by Dafabet.

== Teams ==
Locations of the 2016–17 Welsh Premier League teams

Haverfordwest County and Port Talbot Town were relegated out of the Welsh Premier League the previous season, while Cefn Druids were promoted as winners of the Cymru Alliance and Cardiff Metropolitan University were promoted as winners of Welsh Football League Division One. It will be Cardiff Metropolitan University's debut campaign in the league under that name, although they were formerly members when known as Inter Cardiff.

=== Stadia and locations ===
Team	Location	Stadium	Capacity
Aberystwyth Town	Aberystwyth	Park Avenue	5,000
Airbus UK Broughton	Broughton	The Airfield	1,600
Bala Town	Bala	Maes Tegid	3,000
Bangor City	Bangor	Nantporth	3,000
Cardiff Metropolitan University	Cardiff	Cyncoed Campus	1,620
Carmarthen Town	Carmarthen	Richmond Park	3,000
Cefn Druids	Wrexham	The Rock	3,000
Connah's Quay Nomads	Connah's Quay	Deeside Stadium	1,500
Llandudno	Llandudno	Park MBi Maesdu	1,013
Newtown	Newtown	Latham Park	5,000
Rhyl	Rhyl	The Corbett Sports Stadium	3,000
The New Saints	Oswestry	Park Hall	2,000

== League table ==
Pos	Team	Pld	W	D	L	GF	GA	GD	Pts	Qualification or relegation (Note: Teams played each other twice (22 matches), before the league split into two groups (the top six and the bottom six) for the last 10 matches.)
1	The New Saints (C)	32	28	1	3	101	26	+75	85	Qualification for the Champions League first qualifying round
2	Connah's Quay Nomads	32	16	10	6	45	24	+21	58	Qualification for the Europa League first qualifying round (Note: Bala Town qualified for the Europa League first qualifying round by winning the 2016–17 Welsh Cup.)
3	Bala Town	32	16	9	7	61	46	+15	57	Qualification for the Europa League first qualifying round
4	Bangor City (O)	32	16	4	12	53	53	0	52	Qualification for the Europa League play-offs (Note: Teams played for one spot in the Europa League first qualifying round.)
5	Carmarthen Town	32	10	9	13	40	46	−6	39	Qualification for the Europa League play-offs
6	Cardiff Metropolitan University	32	10	6	16	41	41	0	36	Qualification for the Europa League play-offs
7	Newtown	32	12	9	11	59	41	+18	45	Qualification for the Europa League play-offs
8	Cefn Druids	32	9	12	11	40	48	−8	39	
9	Llandudno	32	7	14	11	31	45	−14	35	
10	Aberystwyth Town	32	10	4	18	41	63	−22	34	
11	Rhyl (R)	32	8	6	18	38	76	−38	30	Relegation to the Cymru Alliance
12	Airbus UK Broughton (R)	32	5	6	21	37	78	−41	21	Relegation to the Cymru Alliance

Source: Welsh Premier League, Soccerway
Rules for classification: 1) Points; 2) Goal difference; 3) Goals scored; 4) Matches won; 5) Play-off.
(C) Champions; (O) Play-off winners; (R) Relegated

== Results ==
Teams play each other twice on a home and away basis, before the league split into two groups – the top six and the bottom six.

=== Matches 1–22 ===
Home \ Away	ABE	AIR	BAL	BAN	CMU	CMR	CDR	CQN	LND	NTW	RHL	TNS
Aberystwyth Town	—	3–1	1–3	0–3	0–2	0–3	0–1	1–3	0–0	1–0	4–0	1–5
Airbus UK Broughton	0–1	—	2–4	4–2	1–0	1–1	3–2	0–3	2–3	0–2	0–3	1–4
Bala Town	4–0	3–3	—	1–1	1–0	0–0	2–0	0–0	3–0	1–0	6–1	0–2
Bangor City	4–0	2–1	2–0	—	2–1	1–2	2–1	0–2	2–1	2–1	3–2	1–2
Cardiff Metropolitan University	1–0	2–0	0–1	4–0	—	1–3	5–0	1–2	1–1	2–1	4–0	1–2
Carmarthen Town	0–5	2–1	2–3	1–1	0–0	—	2–2	0–0	0–1	3–1	5–0	2–4
Cefn Druids	0–3	2–2	4–4	2–3	0–0	0–0	—	0–0	1–3	1–0	4–3	0–2
Connah's Quay Nomads	4–0	5–1	1–1	2–2	0–0	1–0	1–0	—	1–1	1–0	2–0	0–3
Llandudno	0–1	2–0	1–3	1–0	0–1	2–0	0–0	0–2	—	0–0	2–2	0–5
Newtown	2–2	2–4	0–0	1–2	0–1	4–2	1–1	2–1	0–0	—	3–3	3–3
Rhyl	3–1	3–1	2–0	1–0	1–0	0–1	0–3	1–2	0–0	1–3	—	1–2
The New Saints	2–1	4–0	5–1	4–0	3–1	2–1	4–0	3–0	5–0	1–0	10–0	—

Source: Welsh Premier League
Legend: Blue = home team win; Yellow = draw; Red = away team win.

=== Matches 23–32 ===
==== Top six ====
Home \ Away	BAL	BAN	CMU	CMR	CQN	TNS
Bala Town	—	3–2	3–1	1–1	1–1	4–6
Bangor City	1–2	—	3–2	0–2	2–1	3–0
Cardiff Metropolitan University	2–3	2–3	—	2–2	0–0	0–5
Carmarthen Town	0–1	2–3	0–4	—	1–3	1–0
Connah's Quay Nomads	2–0	1–1	2–0	0–1	—	2–1
The New Saints	3–2	4–0	2–0	2–0	1–0	—

Source: Welsh Premier League
Legend: Blue = home team win; Yellow = draw; Red = away team win.

==== Bottom six ====
Home \ Away	ABE	AIR	CDR	LND	NTW	RHL
Aberystwyth Town	—	1–0	0–0	3–4	0–4	4–0
Airbus UK Broughton	4–2	—	0–0	0–0	0–7	0–2
Cefn Druids	2–1	3–1	—	3–2	1–2	4–1
Llandudno	0–2	2–2	0–0	—	1–2	1–1
Newtown	6–1	4–1	1–1	2–2	—	3–2
Rhyl	2–2	2–1	0–2	1–1	0–2	—

Source: Welsh Premier League
Legend: Blue = home team win; Yellow = draw; Red = away team win.

== UEFA Europa League play-offs ==
Teams who finished in positions fourth to seventh at the end of the regular season participated in play-offs to determine the third participant for the 2017–18 UEFA Europa League, who qualified for the first qualifying round.

=== Semi-finals ===
6 May 2017
14:30 BST

Bangor City	3–2	Newtown
Taylor-Fletcher 5'; Nardiello 12'; Roberts 75'	BBC Sport; Soccerway	Boundford 19'; Mitchell 26'

Nantporth, Bangor
Attendance: 638
Referee: Dean John

7 May 2017
14:15 BST

Carmarthen Town	1–2	Cardiff Metropolitan University
Griffiths 48'	BBC Sport; Soccerway	Roscrow 60'; Corsby 90+3'

Richmond Park, Carmarthen
Attendance: 417
Referee: Lee Evans

=== Final ===
13 May 2017
17:15 BST

Bangor City	1–0	Cardiff Metropolitan University
Rittenberg 31'	BBC Sport; Soccerway

Nantporth, Bangor
Attendance: 956
Referee: Bryn Markham-Jones

== Season statistics ==
=== Top goalscorers ===
Rank	Player	Team	Goals
1	(England) Jason Oswell	Newtown	22
2	(New Zealand) Greg Draper	The New Saints	15
2	(England) Alex Darlington	The New Saints	15
4	(England) Mike Haynes	Bala Town	14
5	(Wales) Daniel Nardiello	Bangor City	13
6	(Poland) Adrian Cieslewicz	The New Saints	12
7	(England) Nick Rushton	Connah's Quay Nomads/Newtown	11
7	(Wales) Liam Thomas	Carmarthen Town	11
9	(England) Tony Gray	Airbus UK Broughton	10
9	(England) Ashley Ruane	Cefn Druids	10
9	(Wales) Henry Jones	Bangor City	10
