= Neville Powell =

Welsh football player and manager (born 1963)

Personal information
- Date of birth: 2 September 1963 (age 63)
- Place of birth: Flint, Flintshire, Wales
- Position: Midfielder

Senior career*
| Years | Team | Apps | (Gls) |
| 1981–1984 | Tranmere Rovers | 86 | (4) |
| 1984–1992 | Bangor City | | |
| 1993–1996 | Connah's Quay Nomads | 89 | (6) |

Managerial career
- 1993–2007: Connah's Quay Nomads
- 2007–2016: Bangor City
- 2017–2019: Aberystwyth Town
- * Club domestic league appearances and goals

Neville Powell (born 2 September 1963) is a Welsh football manager and former professional player who was most recently director of football at Aberystwyth Town.

== Career ==
Powell began his playing career at Tranmere Rovers, making a goalscoring debut for the club at the age of 17 on 1 March 1981 in a match against Torquay United. He left the club in 1984 having made 86 appearances for the Prenton Park club, scoring four goals. He went on to spend eight years with Bangor City, playing for the club in the first season of the Welsh Premier League.

In 1993, he took over as player-manager of Connah's Quay Nomads, where his playing career came to an end following a broken leg sustained during a game against Llansantffraid on the opening day of the 1996–97 season. After 14 years in charge at Connah's Quay, Powell took over as manager of Bangor City in 2007, replacing Steve Bleasdale.

Bangor under Neville Powell have been very successful, beating FC Honka in the Europa League 3–2 on aggregate in July 2010, also winning the Welsh Cup for three consecutive years (2008–2010) and winning the Welsh Premier League in the 2010–11 season after starting the season with 15 consecutive wins, a run which was acknowledged across Europe.

On 25 July 2016, news broke that Neville Powell had been "relieved of his duties", according to a statement released by the club.

On 11 July 2017, Powell was named as manager of Aberystwyth Town. On 28 March 2018 the club announced Powell would become director of football and Irish coach Seamus Heath would become manager.

On 6 May 2020, Powell left Aberystwyth Town.

== Career statistics ==
Appearances and goals by club, season and competition
| Club | Season | League | | | National cup (Note: Includes FA Cup, Welsh Cup) | | League cup (Note: Includes League Cup) | | Continental | | Total | |
| Club | Season | Division | Apps | Goals | Apps | Goals | Apps | Goals | Apps | Goals | Apps | Goals |
|---|---|---|---|---|---|---|---|---|---|---|---|---|
| Tranmere Rovers | 1981–82 | Fourth Division | | | | | | | – | | | |
| Tranmere Rovers | 1982–83 | Fourth Division | | | | | | | – | | | |
| Tranmere Rovers | 1983–84 | Fourth Division | | | | | | | – | | | |
| Tranmere Rovers | Total | | | | | | | | 0 | 0 | 86 | 4 |
| Bangor City | 1984–85 | Northern Premier League | | | | | | | – | | | |
| Bangor City | 1985–86 | Northern Premier League | | | | | | | 4 | | | |
| Bangor City | 1986–87 | Northern Premier League | | | | | | | – | | | |
| Bangor City | 1987–88 | Northern Premier League Premier Division | | | | | | | – | | | |
| Bangor City | 1988–89 | Northern Premier League Premier Division | | | | | | | – | | | |
| Bangor City | 1989–90 | Northern Premier League Premier Division | | | | | | | – | | | |
| Bangor City | 1990–91 | Northern Premier League Premier Division | | | | | | | – | | | |
| Bangor City | 1991–92 | Northern Premier League Premier Division | | | | | | | – | | | |
| Bangor City | 1992–93 | League of Wales | | | | | | | – | | | |
| Bangor City | Total | | | | | | | | | | | |
| Connah's Quay Nomads | 1993–94 | League of Wales | | | | | | | – | | | |
| Connah's Quay Nomads | 1994–95 | League of Wales | | | | | | | – | | | |
| Connah's Quay Nomads | 1995–96 | League of Wales | | | | | | | – | | | |
| Connah's Quay Nomads | Total | | 95 | 36 | | | | | 0 | 0 | 89 | 6 |
| Career total | | | | | | | | | 0 | 0 | | |

== Managerial statistics ==
As of 16 October 2010

| Team | Nat | From | To | Record | | | | | | |
| Team | Nat | From | To | G | W | D | L | GF | GA | Win % |
|---|---|---|---|---|---|---|---|---|---|---|
| Connah's Quay Nomads | (Wales) | May 1993 | 9 May 2007 | 494 | 193 | 124 | 177 | 766 | 746 | 39.07 |
| Bangor City | (Wales) | 9 May 2007 | 25 July 2016 | 141 | 77 | 26 | 38 | 283 | 169 | 54.61 |
| Aberystwyth Town | (Wales) | 11 July 2017 | 2018 | 0 | 0 | 0 | 0 | 0 | 0 | — |
| Total | | | | 635 | 270 | 150 | 215 | 1,044 | 915 | 42.52 |

== Honours ==
=== Player ===
Bangor City

- Northern Premier League runner-up: 1986–87
- Welsh Cup: finalist 1984–85
- Northern Premier League President's Cup: 1989

Connah's Quay Nomads

- Welsh League Cup: 1995–96

=== Managerial ===
Connah's Quay Nomads

- Welsh League Cup: 1995–96

Bangor City

- Welsh Premier League: 2010–11
- Welsh Cup: 2007–08, 2008–09, 2009–10; finalist 2010–11
- Welsh League Cup; finalist 2008–09, 2017–18

=== Individual ===
- Welsh Premier League Manager of the Month: January 2018, December 2011, December 2010, September 2010, December 2009, November 2007
- Welsh Premier League Manager of the Year: 2009–10, 2010–11
