= 2017–18 Welsh League Cup =

Nathaniel MG Cup

Tournament details
- Country: Wales; England
- Dates: 29 August 2017 – 20 January 2018
- Teams: 28

Final positions
- Champions: The New Saints
- Runner-up: Cardiff Met

Tournament statistics
- Matches played: 27
- Goals scored: 80 (2.96 per match)
- All statistics correct as of 6 March 2018.

The 2017–18 Welsh League Cup (known for sponsorship purposes as The Nathaniel MG Cup) was the 26th season of the Welsh Premier League's cup competition, which was established in 1992.

Played under a regionalised, knock-out format, the 2017–18 competition was the fourth to be held since the tournament was expanded to include clubs from outside the Welsh Premier League. As well as the 12 Welsh Premier League clubs from the previous season, the top five qualifying clubs from the northern and southern feeder leagues would enter the tournament, along with a number of wildcard entrants.

The New Saints reached their tenth final and won the match 1–0, retaining the trophy and securing their ninth title. Their opponents were fellow Welsh Premier League side Cardiff Met who made their first appearance in the final.

== First round ==
Ties were played on 29 & 30 August 2017.

The semi-finalists from the previous season, The New Saints, Barry Town United, Connah's Quay and Carmarthen Town received a bye to the second round.

Team 1	Score	Team 2
Holywell Town	5–4 (a.e.t.)	Prestatyn Town
Afan Lido	2–1	Penybont
Airbus UK	3–2	Cefn Druids
Bala Town	0–1	Newtown
Bangor City	5–2	Denbigh Town
Caersws	0–2	Aberystwyth Town
Goytre	1–2	Cardiff Met
Haverfordwest County	2–1	Goytre United
Llandudno	0–1	Caernarfon
Pontypridd Town	3–0	Taffs Well
Porthmadog	3–5	Holyhead Hotspur
Rhyl	0–1	Flint Town United

== Second round ==
Ties were played on 3 October 2017.

Team 1	Score	Team 2
Aberystwyth Town	1–2	Airbus UK
Barry Town United	4–2	Afan Lido
Cardiff Met	2–1 (a.e.t.)	Pontypridd Town
Connah's Quay Nomads	2–0	Bangor City
Flint Town United	1–5	The New Saints
Haverfordwest County	0–1 (a.e.t.)	Carmarthen
Holyhead Hotspur	0–3	Caernarfon
Newtown	2–0	Holywell Town

== Quarter-finals ==
Ties were played on 24 October 2017.

Team 1	Score	Team 2
Airbus UK	0–2	Connah's Quay Nomads
Barry Town United	0–2	Cardiff Met
Carmarthen	0–2	Newtown
The New Saints	2–0	Caernarfon

== Semi-finals ==
Ties were played on 15 & 22 November 2017 respectively.

Team 1	Score	Team 2
Cardiff Met	1–0	Newtown
Connah's Quay Nomads	0–1	The New Saints

== Final ==
The match was played on Saturday 20 January 2018 at Park Avenue, Aberystwyth. It was the 13th time the venue had hosted the final.

The tie was broadcast live on S4C.

20 January 2018
17:15

Cardiff Metropolitan University (0)	0–1	The New Saints (0)
	Match stats	Jamie Mullan 63'

Park Avenue, Aberystwyth
Attendance: 906
Referee: Iwan Griffith
