= 2012–13 Welsh Premier League =

Football competition

Welsh Premier League
- Season: 2012–13
- Champions: The New Saints
- Relegated: Llanelli
- Champions League: The New Saints
- Europa League: Airbus UK Broughton; Bala Town; Prestatyn Town (via domestic cup)
- Matches: 192
- Goals: 677 (3.53 per match)
- Top goalscorer: Michael Wilde (25 goals)
- Biggest home win: Bangor City 7–1 Aberystwyth; The New Saints 6–0 Bangor City
- Biggest away win: Newtown 1–7 Airbus UK
- Highest scoring: Connah's Quay 6–4 Afan Lido
- Highest attendance: 846; Bangor City 2–1 Connah's Quay
- Lowest attendance: 76; Afan Lido 2–1 Connah's Quay

The 2012–13 Welsh Premier League, known as the Corbett Sports Welsh Premier League for sponsorship reasons) was the 21st season of the Welsh Premier League, the highest football league within Wales since its establishment in 1992. The season began on 17 August 2012.

The New Saints successfully defended their title.

== Teams ==
Following a decision by UEFA not to allow Neath F.C. a license to compete both domestically and in continental competitions, it was ruled that they would be relegated no matter where in the league they finished. Bottom club Newtown were spared relegation.

Gap Connah's Quay finished first in the 2011–12 Cymru Alliance to return to the Welsh Premier League after a two-year absence.

=== Stadia and locations ===
Location of teams in the 2012–13 Welsh Premier League

Team	Stadium	Capacity
Aberystwyth Town	Park Avenue	5,500
Afan Lido	Marston Stadium	4,200
Airbus UK Broughton	The Airfield	2,100
Bala Town	Maes Tegid	3,000
Bangor City	Nantporth	3,000
Carmarthen Town	Richmond Park	3,000
Gap Connah's Quay	Deeside Stadium	1,500
Llanelli AFC	Stebonheath Park	3,700
Newtown AFC	Latham Park	5,000
Port Talbot Town	Victoria Road	2,500
Prestatyn Town	Bastion Road	2,500
The New Saints	Park Hall	3,000

== League table ==
Pos	Team	Pld	W	D	L	GF	GA	GD	Pts	Qualification or relegation
1	The New Saints (C)	32	24	4	4	86	22	+64	76	Qualification for Champions League second qualifying round
2	Airbus UK Broughton	32	17	3	12	76	42	+34	54	Qualification for Europa League first qualifying round
3	Bangor City	32	14	9	9	65	53	+12	51	Qualification for Europa League play-offs
4	Port Talbot Town	32	13	8	11	51	52	−1	47	Qualification for Europa League play-offs
5	Prestatyn Town	32	11	7	14	62	79	−17	40	Qualification for Europa League first qualifying round (Note: The winner of the 2012–13 Welsh Cup qualify for the 2013–14 UEFA Europa League First qualifying round)
6	Carmarthen Town	32	10	7	15	36	50	−14	37	Qualification for Europa League play-offs
7	Bala Town (O)	32	17	5	10	62	41	+21	56	Qualification for Europa League play-offs
8	Connah's Quay Nomads (Note: Gap Connah's Quay deducted one point for fielding ineligible player.)	32	12	5	15	62	69	−7	40	Qualification for Europa League play-offs
9	Newtown	32	10	7	15	44	54	−10	37	
10	Aberystwyth Town	32	9	10	13	37	58	−21	37	
11	Llanelli (R)	32	10	6	16	41	68	−27	36	Relegation to Welsh Division Three
12	Afan Lido	32	8	3	21	43	79	−36	27	

Source: Welsh Premier League
Rules for classification: 1) points; 2) goal difference; 3) number of goals scored.
(C) Champions; (O) Play-off winners; (R) Relegated

== Llanelli A.F.C. ==
On 22 April 2013, Llanelli A.F.C. were liquidated by HM Revenue and Customs at the High court in London with debts of £21,000; this did not affect the final league table as the club had already played all their league fixtures prior to the ruling.

== Results ==
Teams will play each other twice on a home and away basis, before the league is split into two groups at the end of January 2013 - the top six and the bottom six. Clubs in these groups will play each other twice again to bring the total fixture count to 32.

=== Matches 1–22 ===
Home \ Away	ABE	AFA	AIR	BAL	BAN	CMR	CQN	LLA	NEW	PTA	PRE	TNS
Aberystwyth Town		4–2	1–0	1–1	0–0	1–0	3–0	0–2	0–2	0–5	4–1	1–4
Afan Lido	0–0		1–5	1–0	2–3	2–1	2–1	0–1	2–3	0–3	2–4	1–3
Airbus UK Broughton	5–1	3–1		1–0	2–3	1–2	2–2	1–1	2–1	5–0	5–0	2–1
Bala Town	3–2	3–2	0–2		2–1	3–0	3–6	1–2	4–4	2–0	1–2	2–2
Bangor City	7–1	4–1	2–0	5–0		2–2	2–1	1–2	3–0	2–2	3–3	0–1
Carmarthen Town	2–0	1–1	2–1	1–1	0–1		2–4	1–0	4–2	1–0	2–2	0–0
Connah's Quay Nomads	1–2	6–4	4–1	0–1	2–6	1–1		3–1	2–1	2–0	3–3	1–3
Llanelli	0–0	3–2	2–4	1–4	2–2	4–2	1–6		0–3	0–1	2–2	0–6
Newtown	3–1	1–2	1–7	1–1	3–2	1–2	1–3	1–1		1–1	1–4	1–1
Port Talbot Town	2–4	6–1	4–4	2–1	1–1	2–1	6–1	1–2	1–0		1–0	1–3
Prestatyn Town	2–2	4–2	1–6	1–0	4–1	7–1	4–1	3–1	2–5	1–1		1–0
The New Saints	3–0	2–1	1–0	1–0	3–0	0–3	5–1	0–0	0–1	5–0	4–1	

Source: Welsh Premier League
Legend: Blue = home team win; Yellow = draw; Red = away team win.

=== Matches 23–32 ===
Top six

Home \ Away	AIR	BAN	CMR	PTA	PRE	TNS
Airbus UK Broughton		2–0	2–0	2–0	4–1	1–2
Bangor City	2–0		2–0	3–3	3–3	1–4
Carmarthen Town	1–0	0–1		0–0	3–2	0–1
Port Talbot Town	1–0	1–1	1–0		4–1	0–3
Prestatyn Town	0–4	0–1	2–1	0–1		1–7
The New Saints	4–2	6–0	3–0	5–0	3–0	

Source: Welsh Premier League
Legend: Blue = home team win; Yellow = draw; Red = away team win.

Bottom six

Home \ Away	ABE	AFA	BAL	CQN	LLA	NEW
Aberystwyth Town		4–3	1–3	1–1	2–1	0–0
Afan Lido	0–0		0–2	2–1	1–3	2–1
Bala Town	1–0	4–0		0–5	4–0	3–1
Connah's Quay Nomads	1–1	3–0	1–0		4–2	0–2
Llanelli	4–3	0–2	1–5	0–1		0–1
Newtown	0–0	0–1	0–1	1–0	1–2	

Source: Welsh Premier League
Legend: Blue = home team win; Yellow = draw; Red = away team win.

== UEFA Europa League play-offs ==
Teams who finished in positions third through eighth at the end of the regular season will play-off to determine the second participant for the 2013–14 UEFA Europa League.

=== Quarter-finals ===
4 May 2013
14:30 BST

Bala Town	1 – 0	Gap Connah's Quay
Hunt 76' (pen.)	Report

Maes Tegid, Bala
Attendance: 409
Referee: Mark Whitby

=== Semi-finals ===
11 May 2013
14:00 BST

Bangor City	2 – 4	Bala Town
Jones 57'; Hoy 79'	Report	S. Jones 29'; M. Jones 34'; Sheridan 43', 47'

Book People stadium, Bangor
Attendance: 457
Referee: Richard Harrington

11 May 2013
14:00 BST

Port Talbot Town	1 – 0	Carmarthen Town
Brooks 72'	Report

Victoria Road, Port Talbot
Attendance: 410
Referee: Nick Pratt

=== Final ===
18 May 2013
15:00 BST

Port Talbot Town	0 – 1	Bala Town
	Report	Irving 89'

Victoria Road, Port Talbot
Attendance: 658
Referee: Mark Petch

== Top goalscorers ==
Rank	Player	Club	Goals
1	(England) Michael Wilde	The New Saints	25
2	(England) Chris Simm	Bangor City	21
3	(England) Andy Parkinson	Prestatyn Town	19
4	(Wales) Alex Darlington	The New Saints	18
4	(England) Lee Hunt	Bala Town	18
6	(Wales) Mark Jones	Afan Lido / Aberystwyth Town	17
7	(Wales) David Brooks	Port Talbot Town	16
8	(England) Martin Rose	Llanelli	14
9	(England) Jamie Petrie	Gap Connah's Quay	13
9	(Wales) Liam Thomas	Carmarthen Town	13
