= Victoria Road, Port Talbot =

Sports stadium in Port Talbot, Wales

Coordinates: 51°35′25″N 3°48′8″W

Victoria Road
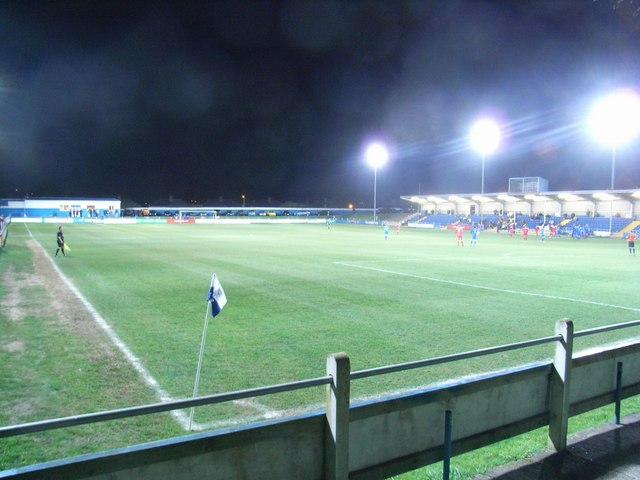
- Interactive map of Victoria Road
- Former names: Remax Stadium
- Location: Port Talbot, Wales
- Capacity: 6,000
- Surface: Grass

Tenants
- Port Talbot Town F.C. (1901-present)

Victoria Road is a field sports stadium located on Victoria Road in Port Talbot, Wales.

== Facilities ==
The stadium has a capacity of 6,000 (1,000 seated) and is the home of Port Talbot Town F.C. The record attendance at the stadium is 2,640, set at a match against Swansea City in the FAW Premier Cup on 15 January 2007. The record league attendance is 804 for a game against Afan Lido on 27 January 2004, however, the club generally struggle to attract a large number of fans, with an average league attendance of just 207 between 1994 and 2010. In an attempt encourage more people to attend the club's games, spectators were allowed to pay whatever price they wanted for a ticket to watch the club's match against Bala Town on 5 January 2013.
