= 2014–15 Welsh Premier League =

Welsh Premier League
- Season: 2014–15
- Champions: The New Saints (9th title)
- Relegated: Prestatyn; Cefn Druids
- Champions League: The New Saints
- Europa League: Bala Town; Airbus; Newtown
- Matches: 192
- Goals: 656 (3.42 per match)
- Top goalscorer: Chris Venables (25 goals)
- Biggest home win: Bala Town 8–1 Carmarthen Town
- Biggest away win: Cefn Druids 0–5 Aberystwyth Town
- Highest scoring: Bala Town 8–1 Carmarthen Town
- Longest winning run: 8 matches The New Saints
- Longest unbeaten run: 30 matches The New Saints
- Longest winless run: 10 games Bangor City; Prestatyn Town
- Longest losing run: 5 games Cefn Druids
- All statistics correct as of 14 March 2015.

The 2014–15 Welsh Premier League (known as the Corbett Sports Welsh Premier League for sponsorship reasons) was the 23rd season of the Welsh Premier League, the highest football league within Wales since its establishment in 1992. The season began on 22 August 2014. The New Saints claimed their ninth Welsh top flight championship on 14 March 2015 after a 3–0 win against nearest rivals in the table Bala Town.

== Teams ==
Location of the 2014–15 Welsh Premier League clubs

Afan Lido were relegated out of the Welsh Premier League the previous season, while Cefn Druids were promoted as winners of the Cymru Alliance.

=== Stadia and locations ===
Team	Location	Stadium	Capacity
Aberystwyth Town	Aberystwyth	Park Avenue	5,000
Airbus UK Broughton	Broughton	The Airfield	1,600
Bala Town	Bala	Maes Tegid	3,000
Bangor City	Bangor	Nantporth	3,000
Carmarthen Town	Carmarthen	Richmond Park	3,000
Cefn Druids	Wrexham	The Rock	3,000
Gap Connah's Quay	Connah's Quay	Deeside Stadium	1,500
Newtown	Newtown	Latham Park	5,000
Port Talbot Town	Port Talbot	Victoria Road	6,000
Prestatyn Town	Prestatyn	Bastion Road	2,300
Rhyl	Rhyl	The Corbett Sports Stadium	3,000
The New Saints	Oswestry	Park Hall	2,000

=== Personnel and kits ===
Team	Head coach	Captain	Kit manufacturer	Shirt sponsors
Aberystwyth	(Wales) Ian Hughes	(Wales)	Nike	Cambrian Tyres
Airbus UK	(England) Andy Preece	(Wales)	Macron	Gardner Aerospace
Bala	(Wales) Colin Caton	(Wales)	Joma	Aykroyd's
Bangor	(Wales) Neville Powell	(Wales)	Macron	Pentraeth Kia
Carmarthen	(Wales) Mark Aizlewood	(Wales)	Macron	McGinley Support
Cefn Druids	(Wales) Huw Griffiths	(Wales)	Joma	AtWill Pubs
Nomads	(England) Mark McGregor	(Wales)	Macron	Think Accounting
Newtown	(Wales) Chris Hughes	(Wales)	Givova	NEO/EOM
Port Talbot	(Wales) Jarred Harvey	(Wales)	Macron	Blanco's
Prestatyn	(Wales) Neil Gibson	(Wales)	Erreà	G & G Foods
Rhyl	(England) Greg Strong	(Wales)	FBT	VanTruck
TNS	(Wales) Carl Darlington	(Wales)	Legea	Derma V10

== League table ==
Pos	Team	Pld	W	D	L	GF	GA	GD	Pts	Qualification or relegation
1	The New Saints (C)	32	23	8	1	90	24	+66	77	Qualification for Champions League first qualifying round
2	Bala Town	32	18	5	9	67	42	+25	59	Qualification for Europa League first qualifying round
3	Airbus UK Broughton	32	18	4	10	62	34	+28	58	Qualification for Europa League first qualifying round
4	Aberystwyth Town	32	14	10	8	69	61	+8	52	Qualification for Europa League play-offs
5	Port Talbot Town	32	13	4	15	54	59	−5	43	Qualification for Europa League play-offs
6	Newtown (O)	32	10	8	14	52	65	−13	38	Qualification for Europa League play-offs
7	Connah's Quay Nomads	32	11	10	11	44	53	−9	43	Qualification for Europa League play-offs
8	Rhyl	32	11	9	12	41	49	−8	42	
9	Carmarthen Town	32	12	6	14	48	57	−9	42	
10	Bangor City	32	9	8	15	48	62	−14	35	
11	Cefn Druids (R)	32	7	6	19	38	64	−26	27	Relegation to Cymru Alliance
12	Prestatyn Town (R)	32	4	6	22	43	86	−43	18	Relegation to Cymru Alliance

Source: Welsh Premier League
Rules for classification: 1) points; 2) goal difference; 3) number of goals scored.
(C) Champions; (O) Play-off winners; (R) Relegated

== Results ==
Teams play each other twice on a home and away basis, before the league is split into two groups at the end of January 2015 – the top six and the bottom six.

=== Matches 1–22 ===
Home \ Away	ABE	AIR	BAL	BAN	CMR	CDR	CQN	NEW	PTA	PRE	RHL	TNS
Aberystwyth Town		2–1	4–0	3–3	5–3	4–2	1–1	1–0	0–3	3–1	2–0	1–1
Airbus UK Broughton	1–1		2–1	5–1	2–0	2–3	4–0	3–0	3–0	2–1	2–1	2–3
Bala Town	4–0	0–0		3–0	8–1	3–1	0–1	3–1	4–1	4–2	1–2	0–3
Bangor City	2–2	1–2	0–3		1–2	0–1	0–2	1–3	2–1	3–3	0–0	0–5
Carmarthen Town	1–3	2–1	1–2	0–2		2–1	1–1	1–1	2–1	3–1	1–0	1–2
Cefn Druids	0–5	1–1	0–1	2–2	1–3		3–2	0–2	2–1	3–1	0–1	0–4
Connah's Quay Nomads	2–4	0–3	0–1	1–0	1–1	1–1		2–3	1–1	3–1	1–3	1–5
Newtown	6–3	1–0	1–2	2–1	0–2	4–1	1–2		3–3	4–3	1–0	2–3
Port Talbot Town	1–2	2–0	4–3	2–0	2–0	4–1	1–1	2–0		3–0	3–0	1–5
Prestatyn Town	2–1	0–2	3–3	1–2	1–3	0–4	3–2	2–2	2–1		1–2	1–3
Rhyl	0–1	1–2	0–1	3–2	1–1	1–1	1–1	2–2	0–3	2–2		2–2
The New Saints	1–1	1–1	1–0	2–0	3–0	3–1	2–0	1–1	2–0	6–0	6–1	

Source: Welsh Premier League
Legend: Blue = home team win; Yellow = draw; Red = away team win.

=== Matches 23–32 ===
Top six

Home \ Away	ABE	AIR	BAL	NEW	PTA	TNS
Aberystwyth Town		1–3	1–2	3–2	2–2	0–4
Airbus UK Broughton	3–2		1–2	6–1	5–0	1–0
Bala Town	3–3	3–0		1–2	4–1	1–1
Newtown	3–3	0–2	1–1		1–3	0–0
Port Talbot Town	1–2	1–0	1–3	4–0		1–3
The New Saints	3–3	2–0	3–0	4–2	6–0	

Source: Welsh Premier League
Legend: Blue = home team win; Yellow = draw; Red = away team win.

Bottom six

Home \ Away	BAN	CMR	CDR	CQN	PRE	RHL
Bangor City		1–0	5–3	1–2	4–0	4–3
Carmarthen Town	3–3		3–1	2–3	5–2	1–3
Cefn Druids	0–2	0–1		2–0	0–1	1–2
Connah's Quay Nomads	1–1	2–1	0–0		3–1	1–1
Prestatyn Town	1–3	1–1	1–1	3–4		1–2
Rhyl	1–1	1–0	2–1	1–2	2–1	

Source: Welsh Premier League
Legend: Blue = home team win; Yellow = draw; Red = away team win.

== UEFA Europa League play-offs ==
Teams who finished in positions fourth to seventh at the end of the regular season took part in play-offs to determine the third participant for the 2015–16 UEFA Europa League.

=== Semi-finals ===
9 May 2015
14:30 BST

Port Talbot Town	0–1 (a.e.t.)	Newtown
		Boundford 120'

GenQuip Stadium, Port Talbot
Attendance: 347
Referee: Kevin Perry

10 May 2015
12:45 BST

Aberystwyth	3–2	Connah's Quay
Venables 18' (pen.); Evans 84' (o.g.); Jones 90'	Report	Miller 14'; Evans 67'

Park Avenue, Aberystwyth
Attendance: 391
Referee: Bryn Markham-Jones

=== Final ===
17 May 2015
12:45 BST

Aberystwyth	1–2	Newtown
Venables 29' (pen.)	Report	Goodwin 9'; Hearsey 43'

Park Avenue, Aberystwyth
Attendance: 1,012
Referee: Lee Evans

== Season statistics ==
As of 18 May 2015

=== Top goalscorers ===
Rank	Player	Team	Goals
1	(Wales) Chris Venables	Aberystwyth Town	28
2	(England) Martin Rose	Port Talbot Town	18
2	(England) Jason Oswell	Newtown	18
4	(New Zealand) Greg Draper	The New Saints	17
4	(England) Lee Hunt	Bala Town	17
6	(England) Michael Wilde	The New Saints	16
6	(England) Tom Field	Airbus UK Broughton	16
8	(Wales) Luke Bowen	Port Talbot Town	14
9	(England) Mark Connolly	Bala Town	13
9	(England) Ian Sheridan	Bala Town	13
11	(England) Lee Healey	Cefn Druids F.C/Bangor	12

=== Hat-tricks ===
As of 14 February 2015

Player	For	Against	Result	Date
(Wales) Chris Venables^{4}	Aberystwyth Town	Cefn Druids	5–0	22 August 2014
(England) Mark Connolly	Bala Town	Carmarthen Town	8–1	7 September 2014
(England) Aaron Bowen	Rhyl	Bangor City	3–2	14 September 2014
(Wales) Luke Boundford	Newtown	Aberystwyth Town	6–3	4 October 2014
(England) Lee Healey	Cefn Druids	Prestatyn Town	3–1	31 October 2014
(England) Martin Rose	Port Talbot Town	Aberystwyth Town	3–0	20 December 2014
(Wales) Chris Hartland	Carmarthen Town	Bangor City	3–3	31 January 2015
(England) Tom Field	Airbus UK Broughton	Aberystwyth Town	3–2	14 February 2015

^{4} Player scored 4 goals
