= Maesdu Park =

Stadium in Llandudno, Wales

- Interactive map of Maesdu Park
- Full name: The Go Goodwins Stadium
- Location: Llandudno, Conwy, Wales
- Coordinates: 53.3158°N 3.8296°W
- Capacity: 1,013
- Surface: 4G

Construction
- Opened: 1991

Tenant
- Llandudno

Maesdu Park (known as The Go Goodwins Stadium for sponsorship reasons) is a multi-sport stadium in Llandudno, Wales. It is currently used mostly for football matches, and is the home ground of Cymru Premier team Llandudno F.C. The 2016 Welsh League Cup final was held at the ground.

== History ==
Maesdu Park was first opened in 1991, with the club moving from the town's Oval ground which had hosted football after Llandudno's previous ground was sold for use as an Asda store in the 1970s. Floodlights were added in 1994 and the following season the club constructed a small clubhouse and two small stands providing 130 seats. A new press box, changing rooms and new grandstands have since been completed.

An artificial pitch was installed at the stadium in the summer of 2010.

In a deal with Giant Hospitality in August 2016, the stadium was renamed. A later sponsorship deal saw the ground named the OPS Wind Arena.

From January 2019, Bangor City played at the ground when water and electricity were cut off from their Nantporth home due to debt. Llandudno were forced to play a home game at Nantporth in October 2022 due to safety concerns over the OPS Wind Arena pitch

In July 2024, The club announced a new partnership deal with Go Goodwins Coach Travel. As part of this partnership, the ground was renamed The Go Goodwins Stadium. Additionally, Go Goodwins will also feature as the main sponsor on the club's new Home and Away shirts for both the men's First Team and Reserves.

For the 2025/26 season, JD Cymru Premier team Caernarfon Town temporarily played their home games at the ground, whilst their stadium The Oval was given a major renovation.

== Clubhouse ==
The stadium has its own bar, The Crossbar, which is available for hire as well as opening on match days.
