= Connah's Quay F.C. =

Former association football club in Wales

Connah's Quay
- Full name: Connah's Quay Football Club
- Nickname: Fishermen
- Founded: 1890
- Dissolved: 1905
- Ground: Halfway Ground, Connah's Quay
Home colours

Connah's Quay F.C. was a Welsh football team. They were nicknamed The Fishermen.

== History ==
The club was founded in 1890 and played in the Golftyn area of the town close to the present stadium. The club folded in 1905 after completing their first season in the Wirral Combination Senior Division 1904–05.

A brand new club called Connah's Quay Twenties was then formed and signed on most of the original Connah's Quay club players and they then joined the Chester & District League Div 1

In 1907, this new Connah's Quay Twenties club merged with another local side Hawarden Bridge, and became known as Connah's Quay and Shotton United

Connah's Quay and Shotton United entered The Combination (with their team name shortened to Connah's Quay in most newspapers). The Combination folded in 1911 so they joined the Liverpool County Combination for 1911–12 season. They then played in the North Wales Alliance and the Cheshire League before folding in 1931.
