= 2016–17 Welsh League Cup =

Nathaniel MG Cup

Tournament details
- Country: Wales; England
- Dates: 6 September 2016 – 21 January 2017
- Teams: 28

Final positions
- Champions: The New Saints
- Runner-up: Barry Town United

Tournament statistics
- Matches played: 27
- Goals scored: 111 (4.11 per match)
- All statistics correct as of 3 February 2017.

The 2016–17 Welsh League Cup (known for sponsorship purposes as The Nathaniel MG Cup) was the 25th season of the Welsh Premier League's cup competition, which was established in 1992.

Played under a regionalised, knock-out format, the 2016–17 competition was the third to be held since the tournament was expanded to include clubs from outside the Welsh Premier League.

As well as the 12 Welsh Premier League clubs from the previous season, the top five qualifying clubs from the northern and southern feeder leagues would enter the tournament, along with a number of wildcard entrants.

The New Saints beat Barry Town United 4–0 in the final, retaining the trophy and securing their eighth title in their ninth appearance in the final.

Their opponents were Barry Town United of the southern section of the Welsh football league system's second tier.

The prize fund for the competition was £15,000, with £10,000 for the winners.

== First round ==
Ties were played on 6 & 7 September 2016.

The semi-finalists from the previous season, The New Saints, Denbigh Town, Connah's Quay and Carmarthen Town received a bye to the second round.

Team 1	Score	Team 2
Abergavenny Town	1–2 (a.e.t.)	Goytre
Cambrian and Clydach	1–3 (a.e.t.)	Barry Town United
Flint Town United	1–5	Bala Town
Guilsfield	2–1	Airbus UK Broughton
Haverfordwest County	6–2 (a.e.t.)	Port Talbot Town
Llandudno	2–1	Holyhead Hotspur
Caernarfon Town	1–5	Rhyl
Cardiff Met	5–0	Taffs Well
Holywell Town	3–5	Cefn Druids
Penrhyncoch	1–2	Aberystwyth Town
Pontypridd Town	2–4	Newtown
Prestatyn Town	4–4 (1–3 on pens)	Bangor City

== Second round ==
Ties were played on 4 & 5 October 2016.

Team 1	Score	Team 2
Barry Town United	1–0	Cardiff Met
Haverfordwest County	1–0	Aberystwyth Town
Llandudno	0–1	Rhyl
The New Saints	2–1	Bala Town
Carmarthen Town	4–2	Goytre
Cefn Druids	2–3	Bangor City
Connah's Quay Nomads	3–1	Denbigh Town
Guilsfield	0–3	Newtown

== Quarter-finals ==
Ties were played on 25 & 26 October 2016.

Team 1	Score	Team 2
Bangor City	0–1	The New Saints
Barry Town United	7–1	Haverfordwest County
Connah's Quay Nomads	2–1	Rhyl
Newtown	2–3 (a.e.t.)	Carmarthen Town

== Semi-finals ==
Ties were played on 8 & 22 November 2016 respectively.

The second semi-final was originally played on 15 November, only to be abandoned due to heavy fog with the score at 2–2.

Team 1	Score	Team 2
Barry Town United	1–0	Carmarthen Town
Connah's Quay Nomads	0–1	The New Saints

== Final ==
The match was played on Saturday 21 January 2017 at Cyncoed Stadium, Cardiff and was the first time the Welsh capital city had hosted the final.

The tie was broadcast live on S4C.

21 January 2017
17:15

The New Saints (0)	4–0	Barry Town United (0)
Seargeant 78'; Cieślewicz 80'; Seargeant 84'; Seargeant 89'

Cyncoed Stadium, Cardiff
Attendance: 1,116
Referee: Iwan Griffith (Conwy)
