= Connah's Quay Nomads F.C. =

Welsh football club

Connah's Quay Nomads
- Full name: Connah's Quay Nomads Football Club
- Nickname: The Nomads
- Founded: July 1946; 80 years ago (as Connah's Quay Juniors)
- Ground: Essity Stadium, Flint
- Capacity: 1,000 (250 Seated)
- Chairman: Gary Dewhurst
- Manager: John Disney
- League: Cymru Premier
- 2025–26: Cymru Premier, 2nd of 12
- Website: www.the-nomads.co.uk
| Home colours | Away colours |

Connah's Quay Nomads Football Club (Welsh: Clwb Pêl-droed Cei Connah) is a Welsh professional football club based in Connah's Quay, Flintshire. They play in the Cymru Premier.

The club was founded in 1946 as Connah's Quay Juniors and adopted the Connah's Quay Nomads F.C. name in 1951. From 2008 to 2017, naming rights were controlled by gap personnel, a recruitment firm, and the club was consequently known as Gap Connah's Quay. The club's home ground is at Cae y Castell in Flint, and accommodates 1,000 spectators.

For the 2006–07 season, they temporarily played their home games in Flint due to drainage problems with the Deeside Stadium pitch.

In April 2013, the club announced that starting with the 2013–14 season, they would be using an all red home kit, accompanied by an all yellow away kit to complement the new logo which includes the traditional colours used in the Connah's Quay Town crest.

On 2 March 2023 it was announced that from the 2023–24 season, they will play their home games in Flint due to behind the scenes tenancy problems with the owners of the Deeside Stadium. On 11 November 2025, the team announced plans to build a new 4000 seater stadium for themselves, Shotton Steel RFC, and potential International matches in both Rugby and Football.

== History ==
=== Early years ===
Before the Nomads, two clubs represented the town. The first was Connah's Quay, founded in 1890 and playing in the Golftyn area of the town. The club reached the Welsh Cup finals of 1908 and 1911, losing both times to Chester and Wrexham, respectively, but was disbanded soon after. A new club, Connah's Quay & Shotton, was formed in 1920, renting land at the rear of the Halfway House Hotel from the Northgate Brewery, and become members of the Welsh National League (North) as a fully professional outfit in 1922.

In 1928, the club moved to Dee Park, Shotton and won both the Welsh National League (North) championship and the prestigious Welsh Cup in 1929. In the final they defeated First Division Cardiff City 3–0 at Wrexham's Racecourse Ground. Cardiff's team contained several players who had beaten Arsenal in the 1927 FA Cup Final. Six months later Connah's Quay & Shotton folded with debts totalling more than £1,000, leaving Connah's Quay Albion to carry the town's football banner through the second war.

Formed in July 1946 as Connah's Quay Juniors, the present-day club was the brainchild of the Everton and Wales centre-half T. G. Jones, a native of the town. Attracted by the reputation of the famous international, the Deeside youngsters flocked to join the new team which quickly became a major force in North Wales youth soccer, winning the Welsh Youth Cup in 1948.

By natural progression a senior team was formed and joined the Flintshire League in 1948. Success soon followed and Connah's Quay Juniors reached the final of the Welsh Amateur Cup in 1950–51. Prior to the 1952–53 season, the club's suffix was changed to Nomads and the team ventured into the Welsh League (North). Though unsuccessful in their challenge for the league title, Connah's Quay once again contested the final of the Welsh Amateur Cup, this time winning the trophy against Caersws Amateurs. The club also reached the semi-final of the Welsh Senior Cup before going down to Football League side Chester at Wrexham's Racecourse ground. Despite winning the North Wales Amateur Cup three times in the 1950s, Nomads moved into local football for seven years prior to rejoining the Welsh League in 1966, twice finishing as runners-up at the start of the 1970s.

In 1974, however, the club joined the newly formed Clwyd League and spent more than a dozen seasons at this level, winning the championship twice. Without doubt, Nomads' most successful season was 1980–81 when they won seven trophies including the Welsh Intermediate Cup, beating Newport YMCA in the final, and the Clwyd League without losing a game. Following three successful seasons in the Welsh Alliance, Connah's Quay became founder members of the Cymru Alliance in 1990 and the League of Wales two seasons later.

Finishing 8th in the new national competition in 1992–93 was a fine achievement after a poor start as was Nomads' appearance in the semi-final of the Welsh Cup despite the disappointment of a 2–1 aggregate defeat against Clwyd rivals Rhyl. Neville Powell joined the club as player/manager in the summer of 1993 though he suffered a bad injury very early in his career at Connah's Quay that would end his playing career. Nevertheless, he steadily built his team into one capable of challenging for a European place. Within twelve months of Powell's arrival, Nomads won the North Wales Coast F.A. Cup and, in 1995–96, won the League of Wales League Cup, beating Ebbw Vale in the final at Caersws.

During the 1997–98 season the club finished seventh in the League of Wales, thus gaining entry into the FAW Premier Cup, and also reached the final of the Welsh Cup for the first time as Connah's Quay Nomads. In the final, played at Wrexham's Racecourse Ground, Bangor City scored a last-minute equaliser and won the cup in a penalty shoot-out when the teams finished level after extra time. The club's home had remained at the Halfway Ground since its formation in 1946, but in July 1998 Nomads moved into the newly constructed athletics stadium at nearby Deeside College in Kelsterton after playing the previous season's home matches 25 miles from Connah's Quay at Rhyl's Belle Vue Stadium. The Halfway Ground has since been demolished and is now the site of a residential development.

=== Emergence ===
Eighteen league victories during 2002–03 saw Nomads reach fifth place in the table, just a point short of a qualifying position for the UEFA Cup. The following season failed to live up to expectations and they finished in 12th place – a feat repeated a year later despite a poor start to that season.

In 2006–07, following protracted problems with drainage at the new ground that had caused numerous postponements and a consequent backlog of fixtures at the end of consecutive seasons, the club played at neighbouring Flint Town United's Cae Y Castell ground whilst extensive reconstruction of the Deeside Stadium drainage system was undertaken. Nomads enjoyed a successful season, eventually finishing in fifth place after a disappointing late run of defeats.

During the following close season manager Neville Powell left to become Bangor City manager, followed by other members of the coaching staff and several senior players. Powell had previously captained Bangor for a number of years before moving to Connah's Quay. Londoner Jim Hackett, formerly a youth coach at Chester City, was appointed manager and he was soon joined by Congleton Town manager Andy Lee as his assistant. Between them they assembled a fresh squad from scratch, including a number of players with previous associations with the two new men and only three players from the previous season, two of whom (Adam Dickinson and Christopher Williams) were under contract. The third, Gary Pinch, was made club captain. The changes were to continue the next close season though, when following the bereavement and retirement of several directors in a twelve-month period, Nomads were taken over in June 2008 and former Caernarfon Town boss Steve O'Shaughnessy was appointed manager.

After only one season, in which the club finished in ninth place, the club replaced O'Shaughnessy. First Hackett was re-appointed as an interim measure before moving to take up a coaching position in Hong Kong, whereupon Nomads appointed Chester born Mark McGregor player/manager at the start of season 2009–10. McGregor previously played in The Football League for Wrexham, where he began his career before transfers to Burnley, Blackpool and Port Vale, making more than 500 senior appearances in total.

Nomads narrowly missed out on the cut off for the Super 12 League, and began the 2010–11 league in the Cymru Alliance, which they subsequently won following a successful season including a Golden Boot award for striker Gary O'Toole, however the team was denied promotion to the Cymru Premier after failing to gain a domestic licence. Nomads won the league again in the 2011–12 season, becoming the first team to win back-to-back Championship titles in the history of the HGA Cymru Alliance League. Striker Gary O'Toole also won the Golden Boot award again and with The Nomads having successfully obtained a domestic licence, promotion back to the Welsh Premier League was secured for season 2012–13.

The 2012–13 season saw a good start for The Nomads with early victories over Port Talbot Town, Llanelli and Newtown. A string of poor results left The Nomads in the lower half of the Welsh Premier League, and prior to the split, they were still in contention to qualify for the championship conference phase of the league season, and with a 6–3 away victory at Bala Town appeared to have secured a place in the top six championship conference, but a controversial decision saw The Nomads deducted a point for the brief fielding of mid-season signing Lee Davey, who was ineligible to play for the Nomads having already played for two other teams in the 2012–13 season. The Nomads were deducted one point, which saw Carmarthen Town elevated to sixth place and The Nomads left in the play-off conference to fight against relegation and attempt to secure a lucrative UEFA Europa League place. The Nomads reached the play-off, having finished eighth in the league, but were beaten 1–0 by eventual Europa League qualifiers Bala Town.

The 2012–13 season also saw the rise to fame of The Nomads Academy's best product thus far, as Rhys Healey scored 14 goals in 21 appearances in all competitions, catching the eye of Cardiff City, signing for the side, who at the time were in the English Premier League. Healey went on to make his Cardiff City debut in the final game of the season against Chelsea.

In January 2015 it was announced that Mark McGregor had left the club by mutual consent after five and a half years at the club and First Team Coach Allan Bickerstaff and Assistant Manager Jay Catton would take charge of the team for the remainder of the 2014–15 Welsh Premier League season. The remainder of the season saw a good run for The Nomads which resulted in finishing seventh in the league, placing the team in the UEFA Europa League playoffs, only to lose 3–2 to Aberystwyth Town F.C. Following the conclusion of the 2014–15 season, Nomads winger, Sean Miller was named as the Welsh Premier League Young Player of the season.

Ahead of the 2015–16 season, Manager, Allan Bickerstaff signed a new three-year deal with the club. However, after winning just 3 of the first 11 games of the 2015–16 season, Bickerstaff parted ways with the club. Former Manchester City captain, Andy Morrison was appointed as first team manager on 2 November 2015.

Morrison turned The Nomads' season around following his appointment, and led the club to a record highest league position, finishing fourth behind Champions, The New Saints, Bala Town and MBi Llandudno respectively. The fourth-placed finish ensured The Nomads place in the Welsh Premier League's Europa League Play-offs, with the benefit of home advantage having finished the highest in the league out of the qualifying teams. In their semi-final, The Nomads defeated Carmarthen Town 2–0. This secured a final fixture with Airbus UK Broughton, which The Nomads won 1–0 thanks to a late Wes Baynes strike, thus securing the club's first place in European football as they secured a spot in the 2016–17 UEFA Europa League First Qualifying Round.

The 2016–17 season started early due to the UEFA Europa League qualification, with a two legged first qualifying round clash with Norwegian side, Stabæk. The Nomads held Stabæk to a 0–0 draw at Rhyl before traveling to Fredrikstad, Norway where an early Callum Morris strike secured an historic 1–0 victory for The Nomads. The result marked the first time in 24 years and 214 games that a Welsh side involved in European competition had kept two clean sheets across the two legs of a European tie. The Nomads would go on to lose 3–1 on aggregate to Serbian side FK Vojvodina in the second qualifying round. This would not be the end of the success for the club in the 2016–17 campaign however as the side went on to finish a record high position in the league, finishing second behind champions, TNS. The Nomads boasted the best defensive record in the league and as a result qualified for both the UEFA Europa League qualifying round as well as the Scottish Challenge Cup for the 2017–18 season.

=== League and cup success ===
The Nomads again achieved surprise success in the UEFA Europa League in the 2017–18 campaign as they defeated Finnish side, HJK Helsinki 1–0 at Bangor City Stadium before losing out 3–1 on aggregate. The 2017–18 season was one of special occasion for the club however, as for the first time under the guise of Connah's Quay Nomads, the club lifted the Welsh Cup thanks to a 4–1 victory over Aberystwyth Town in the final held at Newtown. The club also finished third in the league behind champions TNS and second-placed Bangor City, who however, were relegated as a result of non-compliance of the Welsh Premier League Licensing requirements.

In the 2018–19 season, the Nomads made history as they beat Edinburgh City 5–4 on penalties in the Scottish Challenge Cup semi-finals, and became the first non-Scottish side to reach the finals, despite many non-Scottish sides reaching the semi-final stage in previous seasons. The Nomads lost the final 3–1 to Ross County at the Caledonian Stadium in Inverness on 23 March 2019, with Michael Bakare scoring the lone goal for the Nomads.

In the 2019–20 season, the Nomads beat Scottish Premiership side Kilmarnock 2–0 in Ayrshire, for a Europa League first qualifying round aggregate win. They also won the Welsh League Cup for the second time in their history with a 3–0 win over STM Sports on 1 February 2020 and made it a domestic double by being crowned champions of the Cymru Premier for the first time, qualifying for the UEFA Champions League, after the season was cut short by the COVID-19 pandemic in Wales.

In the 2020–21 season, the Nomads won the Cymru Premier for a second successive season with a title clinching 2–0 win away at Penybont on the final day of the season.

The 2021–22 season would be a transitional and eventful one for the Nomads, although the club still continued to win silverware. Firstly, Andy Morrison resigned from the club in September 2021 and was replaced by the six-time Cymru Premier winning manager, and Nomads first-team coach, Craig Harrison. The club then suffered an 18-point deduction following the conclusion of the first phase of the 2021-22 Cymru Premier season after being found guilty of fielding an ineligible player in six of their Cymru Premier matches. As a result, the club was placed in the Play-off Group (bottom six) of the league for the second phase of the season, eventually overcoming the huge threat of relegation to conclude their league campaign in ninth position. Nonetheless, the Nomads managed to win their third Welsh League Cup trophy in the club's history when they defeated Cardiff Met University on penalties after a goalless draw in the 2022 final played at Penybont's ground.

== Honours ==
=== Men ===
- Cymru Premier
  - Champions: 2019–20, 2020–21
  - Runners-up: 2025–26
- Welsh Cup
  - Winners: 2017–18, 2023–24
- Welsh League Cup
  - Winners: 1995–96, 2019–20, 2021–22
- Cymru Alliance League
  - Winners: 2010–11, 2011–12
- Scottish Challenge Cup
  - Runners-up: 2018–19

=== Women ===
- Adran North
  - Champions: 2024–25 (100% win), 2025–26 (undefeated)

== European record ==
Due to Connah's Quay Nomads home ground not meeting UEFA ground requirements, their European home games have been played at different venues across Wales: most recently, Aberystwyth's Park Avenue (2021–22), Park Hall in Oswestry (2023–24), Nantporth in Bangor (2024–25) and Llanelian Road in Old Colwyn (2026–27).

| Season | Competition | Round | Club | Home | Away | Aggregate |
|---|---|---|---|---|---|---|
| 2016–17 | UEFA Europa League | 1Q | (Norway) Stabæk | 0–0 | 1–0 | 1–0 |
| 2016–17 | UEFA Europa League | 2Q | (Serbia) Vojvodina | 1–2 | 0–1 | 1–3 |
| 2017–18 | UEFA Europa League | 1Q | (Finland) HJK Helsinki | 1–0 | 0–3 | 1–3 |
| 2018–19 | UEFA Europa League | 1Q | (Belarus) Shaktyor Soligorsk | 1–3 | 0–2 | 1–5 |
| 2019–20 | UEFA Europa League | 1Q | (Scotland) Kilmarnock | 1–2 | 2–0 | 3–2 |
| 2019–20 | UEFA Europa League | 2Q | (Serbia) Partizan | 0–1 | 0–3 | 0–4 |
| 2020–21 | UEFA Champions League | 1Q | (Bosnia and Herzegovina) Sarajevo | 0–2 | —N/a | —N/a |
| 2020–21 | UEFA Europa League | 2Q | (Georgia (country)) Dinamo Tbilisi | 0–1 | —N/a | —N/a |
| 2021–22 | UEFA Champions League | 1Q | (Armenia) Alashkert | 2–2 | 0–1 (a.e.t.) | 2–3 |
| 2021–22 | UEFA Europa Conference League | 2Q | (Kosovo) Prishtina | 4−2 | 1−4 | 5−6 |
| 2023–24 | UEFA Europa Conference League | 1Q | (Iceland) KA | 0–2 | 0–2 | 0–4 |
| 2024–25 | UEFA Conference League | 1Q | (Slovenia) Bravo | 0−2 (a.e.t.) | 1–0 | 1−2 |
| 2026–27 | UEFA Conference League | 1Q | (Kosovo) Ballkani | 0–0 | 2–3 | 2–3 |

Notes

- 1Q: First qualifying round
- 2Q: Second qualifying round

== Biggest victories and losses ==
- Biggest League of Wales win: 10–0 v Cemaes Bay in 1998.
- Biggest League of Wales defeat: 0–8 at Bangor City in 1995.

== Current squad ==
As of 15 September 2026

Note: Flags indicate national team as defined under FIFA eligibility rules; some limited exceptions apply. Players may hold more than one non-FIFA nationality.

| No. | Pos. | Nation | Player |
|---|---|---|---|
| 1 | GK | ENG | Chris Renshaw |
| 3 | DF | IRL | Shane Flynn |
| 4 | DF | WAL | James Jones (captain) |
| 5 | DF | WAL | Alex Hughes |
| 6 | DF | ENG | Daniel Cowan |
| 7 | FW | JAM | Darren Stephenson |
| 8 | MF | ENG | Callum West |
| 9 | FW | ENG | Jordan Hodkin |
| 10 | MF | WAL | Iwan Murray |
| 11 | FW | ENG | Mikey Stone |
| 12 | FW | ENG | Harry Franklin |
| 16 | MF | SCO | Frankie Deane |

| No. | Pos. | Nation | Player |
|---|---|---|---|
| 17 | MF | ENG | Adam McCoy |
| 18 | FW | ENG | Max Woodcock |
| 21 | DF | WAL | Rhys Watson |
| 22 | DF | ENG | Joe Simatupang-Ferguson |
| 23 | MF | SOM | Abdi Sharif |
| 27 | FW | ENG | Freddie Redshaw |
| 34 | MF | WAL | Connor Partridge |
| 52 | MF | WAL | Miller Smith |
| 55 | MF | WAL | Alfie Jones |
| 68 | GK | LTU | Dani Liepa |
| 71 | GK | ENG | Rocco Valentino Robinson |
| 99 | FW | EGY | Hussein Mehasseb |

=== Out on loan ===
Note: Flags indicate national team as defined under FIFA eligibility rules; some limited exceptions apply. Players may hold more than one non-FIFA nationality.

| No. | Pos. | Nation | Player |
|---|---|---|---|
| 32 | FW | WAL | James Hughes (at Airbus UK Broughton until January 2027) |
| 33 | DF | ENG | Joe Bennett (at Gresford Athletic until January 2027) |

| No. | Pos. | Nation | Player |
|---|---|---|---|
| 37 | MF | WAL | Jack Waterhouse (at Ruthin Town) |
| — | MF | WAL | Aiden Calby (at Gresford Athletic) |

== Managers ==
- (England) Ray Jones (1992 – May 1993)
- (Wales) Neville Powell / Phil Evans (May 1993 – May 1995)
- (Wales) Neville Powell (May 1995 – May 2007)
- (England) Jim Hackett (May 2007 – May 2008)
- (Wales) Steve O'Shaughnessy (June 2008 – June 2009)
- (England) Jim Hackett (June 2009 – July 2009)
- (England) Mark McGregor (July 2009 – January 2015)
- (Wales) Allan Bickerstaff (January 2015 – October 2015)
- (Scotland) Andy Morrison (November 2015 – September 2021)
- (England) Craig Harrison (September 2021 – August 2022)
- (Wales) Neil Gibson (August 2022 – August 2024)
- (England) Billy Paynter (August 2024 – April 2025)
- (Republic of Ireland) John Disney (May 2025 –)
