= 2014–15 Welsh League Cup =

Loosemores League Cup

Tournament details
- Country: Wales; England
- Dates: 11 August 2014 – 25 January 2015
- Teams: 28

Final positions
- Champions: The New Saints
- Runner-up: Bala Town

The 2014–15 Welsh League Cup was the 23rd season of the Welsh League Cup, which was established in 1992. The twelve teams from the Welsh Premier League entered, along with fifteen from other divisions in the Welsh pyramid and one from England's Southern Football League Division One South & West. Four teams were given a bye into the Second Round. The New Saints won the competition for the sixth time after defeating Bala Town with 3–0 in the final.

== First round ==
The matches were played on 11, 13, 16, 18, 19, 20 August and 9 September 2014.

Team 1	Score	Team 2
Pen-y-Bont (2)	4−0	Llanidloes Town (2)
Denbigh Town (2)	0−1	Cefn Druids (1)
Haverfordwest County (2)	4−0	Afan Lido (2)
Prestatyn Town (1)	4−2	Conwy Borough (2)
Bangor City (1)	3−1	Newtown (1)
Gap Connah's Quay (1)	0–2	Rhyl (1)
Taff's Well (2)	0–2	Aberystwyth Town (1)
Caersws (2)	3−5	Llandudno (2)
Porthmadog (2)	0−2	The New Saints (1)
Aberdare Town (2)	1–5	Port Talbot Town (1)
Guilsfield (2)	2–3	Caernarfon Town (2)
Barry Town (3)	1−7	Merthyr Town (n/a - invitee)

== Second round ==
The matches were played on 2, 3, 10 and 17 September 2014.

Team 1	Score	Team 2
Aberystwyth Town (1)	0−1 (a.e.t.)	Bala Town (1)
Bangor City (1)	2−1	Cefn Druids (1)
Carmarthen Town (1)	2−3 (a.e.t.)	Pen-y-Bont (2)
Prestatyn Town (1)	6−5 (a.e.t.)	Caernarfon Town (2)
The New Saints (1)	2−1	Airbus UK Broughton (1)
Port Talbot Town (1)	1−0	Haverfordwest County (2)
Llandudno (2)	1−1 (a.e.t.) (4−2 p)	Rhyl (1)
Cambrian & Clydach Vale (2)	1−2	Merthyr Town (n/a - invitee)

== Third round ==
The matches were played on 23 and 24 September 2014.

Team 1	Score	Team 2
Prestatyn Town (1)	1−0	Bangor City (1)
Bala Town (1)	3−1	Llandudno (2)
The New Saints (1)	3−0	Pen-y-Bont (2)
Port Talbot Town (1)	2−1	Merthyr Town (n/a - invitee)

== Semi-finals ==
The matches were played on 18 November 2014.

Team 1	Score	Team 2
Bala Town (1)	2−0	Prestatyn Town (1)
The New Saints (1)	2−1 (a.e.t.)	Port Talbot Town (1)

== Final ==
The match was played on Sunday 25 January 2015 at Latham Park.

25 January 2015
12:45 GMT

Bala Town (1)	0–3	The New Saints (1)
		Quigley 29', 80'; Seargeant 41'

Latham Park, Newtown
Attendance: 657
Referee: Mark Whitby
