= 2015–16 Welsh League Cup =

Word Cup

Tournament details
- Country: Wales; England
- Dates: 8 September 2015 – 23 January 2016
- Teams: 20

Final positions
- Champions: The New Saints
- Runner-up: Denbigh Town

Tournament statistics
- Matches played: 27
- Goals scored: 106 (3.93 per match)
- All statistics correct as of 24 January 2016.

The 2015–16 Welsh League Cup (known for sponsorship purposes as theWord Cup) was the 24th season of the Welsh League Cup, which was established in 1992. The New Saints are the defending champions after defeating Bala Town with 3–0 in the previous final. The prize fund for the competition is £15,000, with £10,000 going to the winners. The semi-finalists from the previous season, The New Saints, Bala Town, Port Talbot Town and Prestatyn Town received a bye to the second round.

The New Saints reached their eighth final and won the match 2–0, their seventh and record title. Their opponents in the final were Denbigh Town of the northern section of the Welsh football league system second tier, the Cymru Alliance.

== First round ==
The draw for the first round was made on 6 June 2015 in Aberystwyth. Games were played on 8 & 9 September 2015.

Team 1	Score	Team 2
Holyhead Hotspur (2)	2–0	Llandudno (1)
Rhyl (1)	2–4	Denbigh Town (2)
Bangor City (1)	0–1	Caernarfon (2)
Cefn Druids (2)	0–2	Airbus UK Broughton (1)
Guilsfield (2)	0–3 (a.e.t.)	Connah's Quay Nomads (1)
Holywell Town (2)	2–1	Buckley Town (2)
Aberystwyth Town (1)	5–1	Goytre United (2)
Pen-y-Bont (2)	0–4	Haverfordwest County (1)
Carmarthen Town (1)	4–4 (a.e.t.) (5–4 p)	Briton Ferry Llansawel (2)
Cardiff Metropolitan University (2)	0–1	Ton Pentre (2)
Pontypridd Town (4)	2–1	Taff's Well (2)
Penrhyncoch (3)	2–2 (a.e.t.) (9–8 p)	Newtown (1)

== Second round ==
The draw for the second round was made on 10 September 2015 in Cardiff. Matches were played on 29 and 30 September 2015. The lowest ranking team left in the competition was Level 4 Pontypridd Town.

Team 1	Score	Team 2
Ton Pentre (2)	1–3	Port Talbot Town (1)
Haverfordwest County (1)	4–1	Aberystwyth Town (1)
Carmarthen Town (1)	4–2	Pontypridd Town (4)
Caernarfon (2)	2–1	Bala Town (1)
Airbus UK Broughton (1)	2–0	Penrhyncoch (3)
Holyhead Hotspur (2)	0–4	Denbigh Town (2)
Prestatyn Town (2)	1–3	Connah's Quay Nomads (1)
The New Saints (1)	7–1	Holywell Town (2)

== Third round ==
The draw for the third round was made on 1 October 2015 by Welsh national assistant manager Osian Roberts. Matches were played on 20 October 2015. The lowest ranking teams left in the competition were Level 2 Caernarfon and Denbigh Town.

Team 1	Score	Team 2
Carmarthen Town (1)	3–1	Port Talbot Town (1)
The New Saints (1)	3–1	Haverfordwest County (1)
Denbigh Town (2)	2–1	Airbus UK Broughton (1)
Connah's Quay Nomads (1)	5–3	Caernarfon (2)

== Semi-final ==
The draw for the semi-finals was made in Cardiff on 21 October 2015 by Bala Town goalkeeper Ashley Morris. Matches were played on 17 and 18 November 2015. The lowest ranked team left in the competition was Level 2 Denbigh Town.

Team 1	Score	Team 2
Denbigh Town (2)	1–0	Connah's Quay Nomads (1)
The New Saints (1)	4–1	Carmarthen Town (1)

== Final ==
The match was played on Saturday 23 January 2016 at Maesdu Park, Llandudno. This was the first time that the ground has hosted the final of the cup and the tie was shown live on S4C.

23 January 2016

Denbigh Town (2)	0–2	The New Saints (1)
	TNS overcome brave underdogs to lift cup

Maesdu Park, Llandudno
Referee: Lee Evans
