= Nantporth =

Football stadium in Wales

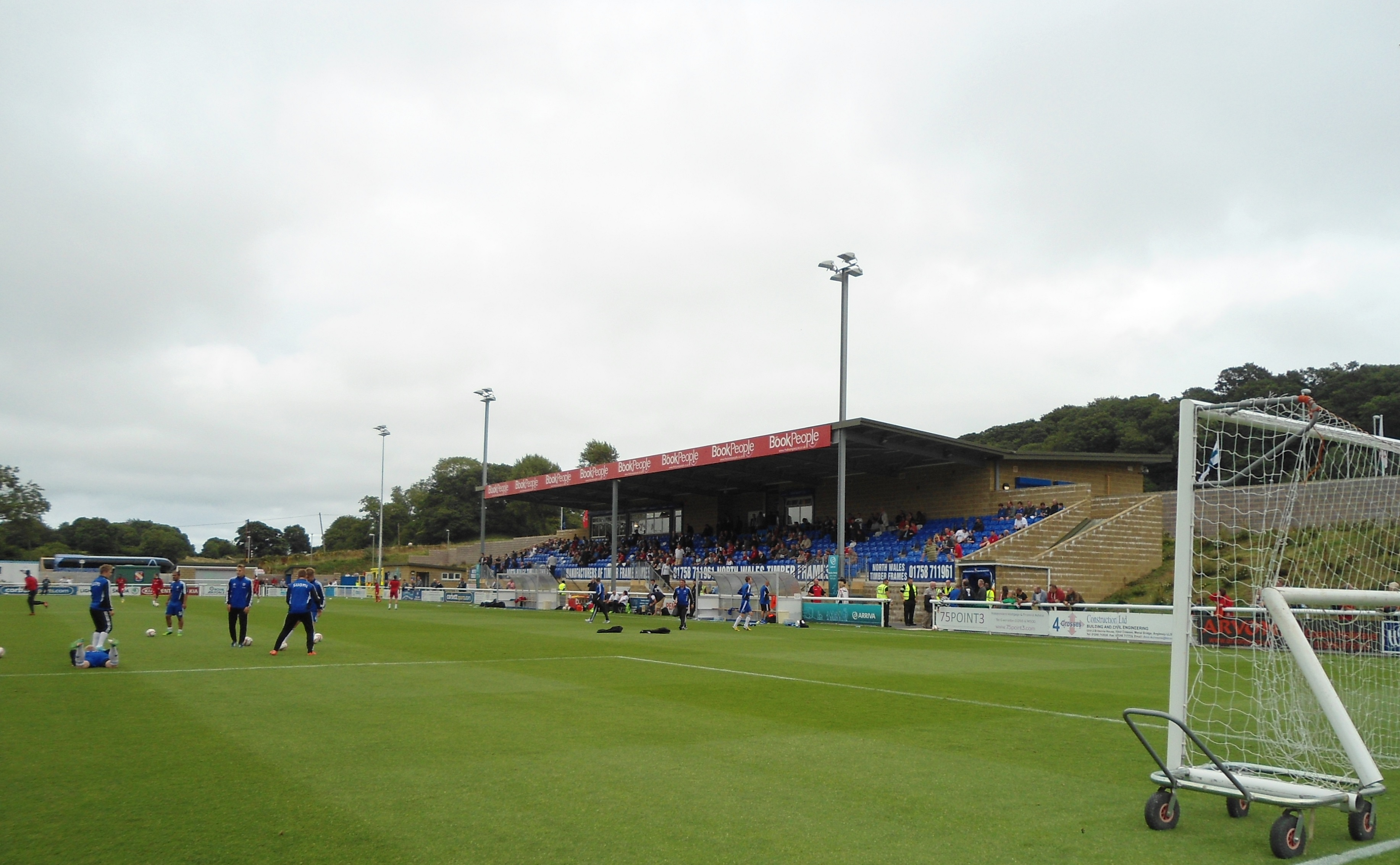
- Nantporth Stadium in 2013
- Interactive map of Nantporth
- Former names: Normal Site Playing Fields
- Location: Bangor, Gwynedd, Wales
- Coordinates: 53°13′32″N 4°09′1″W
- Owner: Bangor City Council
- Capacity: 3,000 (1,158 seated)
- Surface: Grass

Construction
- Groundbreaking: January 2008
- Opened: 24 January 2012

Tenants
- Bangor 1876 FC (2023–present); Bangor City FC (2012–2022); Llandudno FC (2022–2023)

Nantporth (known as Bangor City Stadium since 2024) is an association football stadium in Bangor, Wales. It is currently used as the home ground of Cymru North side Bangor 1876.

Bangor City F.C. played between January 2012 and 2022, having moved from their previous ground, Farrar Road, that opened in the 1920s.

== History ==
Previously the ground was used occasionally by Bangor University football and rugby clubs, as well as practical lectures by the university's 'Normal Site' campus, which is home to the Sports Science and Education faculties. The main pitch overlooks the Menai Strait, with views in both directions along the coast.

Building work started on the new stadium in August 2011, and was completed in January 2012. the capacity was originally going to consist of a 3,000 Seater main stand until the developers pulled back on that statement after 2012 the seating has remained practically the same about the bare minimum to play low level European games

The stadium was built by developer Watkin Jones as part of a joint project with Morbaine Ltd. Both companies formed a further company "Deiniol Developments" for the purpose of the Nantporth construction and the development of the football club's former home at Farrar Road into an Asda supermarket. The work was undertaken on behalf of Bangor City Council, the site owners. Under this agreement the developers installed 805 seats in the main stand. The club have installed a further approximate 300 seats in the Menai Stand on the opposite side of the pitch. A planning application has been submitted for further seating to be installed. Bangor City hoped to take the overall seating to over 1,500 in time for Bangor to play any European matches there at the end of the 2012–13 season should they qualify. In 2015 the installation of a full-size astro-turf training pitch on the same site was completed. In March 2015 Bangor looked into adding a 500 rail seat stand behind the Menai Bridge End as well as previous and ongoing plans for covered terracing behind both the goals

In January 2019, the water and electric supply to the stadium was cut off due to an outstanding debt of £25,000 and the club had to play at Maesdu Park in Llandudno instead.

It was announced in August 2022 that the club had surrendered its lease on the stadium.

On July 6 2024, former Everton and Scotland striker Graeme Sharp officially opened the new Bangor City Stadium, just before the Bangor 1876 match against FC United of Manchester. The event marked a significant moment for the community and the future of football in Bangor. Including taking steps towards becoming the first net-zero football stadium in Wales as well as a renewed plan of possible category 3 status in the far future among other things.

== Attendances ==
The five largest attendances for Bangor City in League, Cup or European matches at Nantporth have been:

Date	Competition	Opposition	Attendance
26 January 2019	Welsh Cup	Caernarfon Town	2,486
18 May 2014	Welsh Premier League play-offs	Rhyl	1,442
6 July 2017	UEFA Europa League	Lyngby BK	1,089
5 July 2012	UEFA Europa League	FC Zimbru	1,022
26 August 2013	Welsh Premier League	Rhyl	918

There was also a crowd of over 1,200 for the first game, a North Wales Coast Challenge Cup match for Bangor against Caernarfon Wanderers on 24 January 2012 and a crowd of over 1,000 for the North Wales Coast Challenge Cup Final against Caernarfon Town on 13 May 2014 and another crowd of over 1000 against Caernarfon Town on the 8th of September 2015. There are however, no official figures published for these matches and they are considered minor cup matches. A friendly match against Liverpool F.C. under-23 on 4 January 2017 brought in an attendance of 2,006. On 26 January 2019, Bangor hosted Caernarfon Town in the Welsh Cup fourth round and lost 2–1. This attracted 2,486 spectators, the largest in any Welsh Cup game for over 20 years.

The stadium also hosts men's and women's football biennially as part of the Varsity Series tournament between Bangor University and Aberystwyth University, as well as European matches and Welsh Cup finals like Caernarfon v Crusaders in 2024 with a crowd of 1,088 and even more at the match against legia Warsaw.

== Sponsors ==
Period	Sponsor	Stadium name
2012–15	The Book People	The Book People Stadium
2015–17	Bangor University	Bangor University Stadium
2017–19	Vaughan Sports Management	VSM Stadium
2019	EUROGOLD	The EUROGOLD Stadium
