= Scott Ruscoe =

Welsh footballer and manager

Personal information
- Full name: Scott Ruscoe
- Date of birth: 15 December 1977 (age 48)
- Place of birth: Shrewsbury, England
- Height: 5 ft 10 in (1.78 m)
- Position: Midfielder

Youth career
- 1994–1996: Stoke City
- 1996–1997: Port Vale

Senior career*
Years	Team	Apps	(Gls)
1997–2000	Newtown	98	(17)
2000–2002	Chester City	49	(5)
2002–2016	The New Saints	326	(56)
Total		477	(78)

International career
	Wales semi-pro	3	(0)

Managerial career
- 2017–2021: The New Saints
- 2024: Newtown
- * Club domestic league appearances and goals

Scott Ruscoe (born 15 December 1977) is a Welsh football manager and former professional footballer and former manager of The New Saints and Newtown.

A central midfielder, he was capped by the Wales semi-pro team. A former youth team player with Stoke City and Port Vale, he made his first-team debut at League of Wales side Newtown in 1997. He spent three years with the club before joining Conference club Chester City in June 2000. He returned to the League of Wales with TNS in January 2002 and would spend the rest of his career there. During this time, the club won the league championship eight times, the Welsh Cup four times, the Welsh League Cup six times, and the FAW Premier Cup once. He was inducted into the Welsh Premier League Hall of Fame in November 2015.

He was appointed manager of The New Saints in May 2017. In the 2017–18 season, he secured the Welsh Premier League and Welsh League Cup titles, and in the 2018–19 season, he secured the league title and the Welsh Cup. He was sacked in March 2021 and returned to management with Newtown in January 2024.

== Playing career ==
=== Newtown ===
Ruscoe started his career with two years at Stoke City, and then a year at Port Vale before he joined League of Wales side Newtown in 1997. He scored seven goals from 34 appearances in the 1997–98 season as the "Robins" finished as runners-up behind champions Barry Town. He then scored four goals from 31 league games in 1998–99 as the Latham Park club dropped to sixth position. He scored six goals in 33 games in 1999–2000 as Newtown posted an eighth-place finish. Ruscoe's performances caught the eye of Chester City, who signed him on a two-year contract.

=== Chester City ===
On 23 June 2000, Ruscoe signed a two-year contract with Conference club Chester City. He scores his first goal for the "Seals" on 28 November, coming off the bench to claim the winning goal in extra time of an FA Cup first round victory over Third Division side Plymouth Argyle at Home Park. He played a total of 37 league and cup games across the 2000–01 campaign, as the "Blues" posed an eighth-place finish under the stewardship of Graham Barrow. However, he lost his first-team place at the Deva Stadium after new manager Gordon Hill was sacked early in the 2001–02 season.

=== TNS ===
On 29 January 2002, Ruscoe joined TNS on a free transfer, signing an 18-month contract. He scored three goals in 15 league games in the second half of the 2001–02 season as TNS finished as runners-up to Barry Town. He missed just two league games in the 2002–03 season and scored nine goals in his 32 appearances, though TNS again finished as runners-up to Barry Town. He scored three goals in 26 matches in 2003–04 as TNS finished again in second place, just one point behind champions Rhyl. After three successive second-place finishes, he secured a league winners medal in 2004–05 after scoring three times in 31 games. The club retained their title with an 18-point margin in 2005–06, with Ruscoe claiming three goals from 30 league matches. A third consecutive title followed in 2006–07, Ruscoe claiming four goals from 29 matches.

He scored ten goals from 33 league appearances in 2007–08. However, TNS finished as runners-up to Llanelli. They then dropped to third place in 2008–09, with Ruscoe scoring five goals from 32 games. He played in the 2009 final of the Welsh League Cup, as TNS beat Bangor City 2–0 at Latham Park. He scored eight goals from 32 games in 2009–10 as TNS claimed the fourth league title of his spell at the club. They dropped to second place in 2010–11, behind champions Bangor City, despite Ruscoe contributing five goals from 32 league appearances. He scored the winning goal in the last minute of extra time in the 2011 Welsh League Cup final, a 4–3 victory over Llanelli at Park Avenue. He won a fifth league title in 2011–12, scoring twice from 22 games. A sixth league title followed in 2012–13, though he played just 14 league games, scoring once. He failed to make a first-team appearance in 2013–14, played just twice in 2014–15, before retiring after failing to make a league appearance in the 2015–16 campaign.

During his time at the club, the "Saints" won the league championship eight times, the Welsh Cup four times, the Welsh League Cup six times, and the FAW Premier Cup once. He also holds the league record for the most European appearances – with 30 games in total and was named Clubman of the Year by the Football Association of Wales in 2014. He was inducted into the Welsh Premier League league Hall of Fame in November 2015.

== International career ==
Ruscoe won three caps for the Wales semi-pro team.

== Style of play ==
Ruscoe was a central midfielder and a dead ball specialist.

== Managerial career ==
=== The New Saints ===
On 30 May 2017, Ruscoe was appointed interim manager of The New Saints following manager Craig Harrison's departure to Hartlepool United. He led the club to victory over Gibraltar champions Europa in the first round of qualifying for the UEFA Champions League, and despite losing 7–1 in the following round to Croatian champions Rijeka, he was named as the club's permanent manager on 31 July. On 20 January 2018, he secured his first silverware as manager, as Saints won the Welsh League Cup final with a 1–0 victory over Cardiff Metropolitan University. He went on to lead the club to the Welsh Premier League title at the end of the 2017–18 season, as the Saints finished 14 points clear of second-place Bangor City. He was also named as WPL Manager of the Month for September and January.

Saints narrowly lost 5–4 on aggregate to Macedonian champions KF Shkëndija in the first round of qualification for the UEFA Champions League. They defeated Gibraltarian side Lincoln Red Imps in the second round of Europa League qualification, before being beaten 5–1 on aggregate by Danish club Midtjylland. They went on to win the 2018–19 Welsh Premier League by a 12-point margin over Connah's Quay Nomads. Defeated in the Welsh League Cup semi-finals, they went on to lift the Welsh Cup with a 3–0 victory over Connah's Quay Nomads. They ended the 2019–20 campaign as runners-up after finishing behind Connah's Quay Nomads on points per game; the season had been curtailed early due to the COVID-19 pandemic in Wales. The club broke their transfer record to sign Adam Roscrow from AFC Wimbledon in January 2021. Ruscoe was sacked on 7 March 2021, despite TNS being narrowly ahead of Connah's Quay at the top of the 2020–21 league table.

=== Coaching ===
Ruscoe began coaching the under-16s at Port Vale in April 2022.

=== Newtown ===
On 18 January 2024, Ruscoe was appointed as manager of Newtown, who were in fifth place in the Cymru Premier. They finished fourth at the end of the 2023–24 season. However, he was sacked on 5 November 2024 following a poor fun of form.

== Career statistics ==
=== Playing statistics ===
Appearances and goals by club, season and competition
Club	Season	League			FA Cup		League Cup		Other		Total	
Club	Season	Division	Apps	Goals	Apps	Goals	Apps	Goals	Apps	Goals	Apps	Goals
Port Vale	1997–98	First Division	0	0	0	0	0	0	—		0	0
Newtown	1997–98	League of Wales	34	7								
Newtown	1998–99	League of Wales	31	4								
Newtown	1999–2000	League of Wales	33	6								
Newtown	Total		98	17								
Chester City	2000–01	Conference	27	1	3	1	—		7 (Note: 3 appearances in Conference League Cup, 2 appearances in Football League Trophy, and 2 appearances in FA Trophy.)	0	37	2
Chester City	2001–02	Conference	22	4	0	0	—		1 (Note: Appearance(s) in Conference Shield.)	0	23	4
Chester City	Total		49	5	3	1	0	0	8	0	60	6
TNS	2001–02	League of Wales	15	3								
TNS	2002–03	Welsh Premier League	32	9								
TNS	2003–04	Welsh Premier League	26	3								
TNS	2004–05	Welsh Premier League	31	3								
TNS	2005–06	Welsh Premier League	30	3								
TNS	2006–07	Welsh Premier League	29	4								
TNS	2007–08	Welsh Premier League	33	10								
TNS	2008–09	Welsh Premier League	32	5								
TNS	2009–10	Welsh Premier League	32	8								
TNS	2010–11	Welsh Premier League	32	5								
TNS	2011–12	Welsh Premier League	22	2								
TNS	2012–13	Welsh Premier League	14	1								
TNS	2013–14	Welsh Premier League	0	0								
TNS	2014–15	Welsh Premier League	2	0								
TNS	2015–16	Welsh Premier League	0	0								
TNS	Total		326	56								
Career total			477	78								

=== Managerial statistics ===
As of match played 5 November 2024

Managerial record by team and tenure
Team	From	To	Record					Ref.
Team	From	To	P	W	D	L	Win %	Ref.
The New Saints	30 May 2017	7 March 2021	151	98	25	28	64.90	
Newtown	30 May 2017	5 November 2024	28	8	6	14	28.57	
Total			179	106	31	42	59.22	

== Honours ==
=== Player ===
TNS

- Welsh Premier League (9): 2004–05, 2005–06, 2006–07, 2009–10, 2011–12, 2012–13, 2013–14, 2014–15, 2016–17
- Welsh Cup (4): 2005, 2012, 2014, 2015
- Welsh League Cup (3): 2009, 2011, 2015; runner-up: 2013

=== Manager ===
Individual

- Welsh Premier League Manager of the Month (2): September 2017 & January 2018

TNS

- Welsh Premier League (2): 2017–18, 2018–19
- Welsh League Cup: 2018
- Welsh Cup (2): 2019
