= Gerard Doherty =

Northern Irish footballer (born 1981)

Personal information
- Full name: Gerard Doherty
- Date of birth: 24 August 1981 (age 45)
- Place of birth: Derry, Northern Ireland
- Height: 1.88 m (6 ft 2 in)
- Position: Goalkeeper

Senior career*
Years	Team	Apps	(Gls)
1998–1999	Derry City	1	(0)
1999–2001	Derby County	0	(0)
2001–2007	The New Saints	233	(0)
2004	→ Barry Town (loan)	2	(0)
2008–2018	Derry City	323	(0)
2018–2021	Crusaders	34	(0)
2021–2022	Finn Harps	6	(0)
2023	Cliftonville	2	(0)

International career
1999	Republic of Ireland U18	1	(0)
2011	League of Ireland XI	1	(0)
- * Club domestic league appearances and goals as of 00:08, 18 April 2023 (UTC)

Gerard Doherty (born 24 August 1981) is a Northern Irish footballer who plays as a goalkeeper.

== Club career ==
Born in Derry, Northern Ireland, Doherty began his career with his hometown club, Derry City, making his debut as a 16-year-old in a league cup win against Irish side Sligo Rovers. His potential alerted English outfit Derby County and they signed him in February 1999 for a fee of £30,000. After failing to break into the Derby first-team and falling out with goalkeeping coach Eric Steele, Doherty left the club in the summer of 2001 and was offered a trial with La Liga side Valencia. The trial was ultimately unsuccessful, and Doherty returned to the UK in November 2001 when he was signed by the Welsh Premier League team, The New Saints.

In six largely successful seasons at The Saints, Gerard won three league titles, one Welsh Cup, one League Cup, and one FAW Premier Cup, and played in six European ties, most notably against English sides Manchester City and Liverpool. Doherty performed particularly well in the two matches against Liverpool, winning plaudits from manager Rafael Benítez.

Doherty re-signed for Derry City in January 2008. In his second spell at the club, Doherty has won the League of Ireland Cup twice, in 2008 and 2011, and also the League of Ireland First Division in 2010. His great form in 2011 was rewarded when he was named Airtricity/Soccer Writers' Association of Ireland Goalkeeper of the Year.

On 1 July 2021, Doherty signed for Finn Harps until the end of the 2021 League of Ireland Premier Division season. Following a successful season for Doherty, he re-signed again for 2022 in a player-coach role, taking on the role of goalkeeper coach with the first team squad. On 28 July 2022, it was announced that Doherty was one of 4 players to depart the club.

On 2 January 2023, Doherty signed for NIFL Premiership side Cliftonville.

== International career ==
Doherty represented the Republic of Ireland once at under-18 level in September 1999, playing against Germany in a 0–0 friendly draw at Richmond Park. However, his form for Derry City in the 2011 season prompted calls from his manager, Declan Devine, for Doherty to be called into the Northern Ireland squad. Doherty received his first call-up for Northern Ireland prior to their friendly against Malta in February 2013, becoming the first Derry player to be included in a national squad since Niall McGinn against Hungary in 2008.

== Honours ==
=== Club ===
Total Network Solutions/The New Saints

- Welsh Premier League (3): 2005, 2006, 2007
- Welsh Premier League Runners Up (4): 2002, 2003, 2004, 2008
- Welsh Cup (1): 2005
- Welsh Cup (1): Runners Up 2004
- Loosemore's Cup (1): 2006
- FAW Premier Cup (1): 2007

Derry City

- FAI Cup (1): 2012
- League of Ireland Cup (3): 2008, 2011 2018
- League of Ireland First Division (1): 2010

Crusaders

- Irish Cup (1): 2018–19

=== Individual ===
- PFAI Premier Division Team of the Year: 2016
