= 2008–09 Welsh League Cup =

Loosemores League Cup

Tournament details
- Country: Wales; England
- Teams: 18

Final positions
- Champions: The New Saints
- Runners-up: Bangor City

Tournament statistics
- Matches played: 45
- Goals scored: 178 (3.96 per match)
- All statistics correct as of 19:30, 30 August 2009 (UTC).

The 2008–09 Welsh League Cup season was won by The New Saints, beating Bangor City in the final. It was the third victory for The New Saints in the competition, and the fifth appearance by Bangor City in the final. The final took place at Latham Park, in Newtown, Wales. The match was refereed by Phil Southall.

== Round and draw dates ==
Date	Event
19 August 2008	Group stage, round 1
2 September 2008	Group stage, round 2
9 September 2008	Group stage, round 3
23 September 2008	Group stage, round 4
7 October 2008	Group stage, round 5
14 October 2008	Group stage, round 6
28 October – 25 November 2008	Quarter-finals
28 November 2008 – 9 December 2008	Semi-finals, first leg
9 December 2008 – 13 January 2009	Semi-finals, second leg
5 April 2009	Final in Latham Park, Newtown

== Group stage ==
Key to colours in group tables
Teams progressed to the quarter finals
Best runner-up that progressed to the quarter finals

=== Group 1 ===
Team	Pld	W	D	L	GF	GA	GD	Pts
Aberystwyth Town	4	1	3	0	7	3	+4	6
Carmarthen Town	4	1	2	1	4	4	+0	5
Haverfordwest County	4	1	1	2	3	7	−4	4

	ABER	CAR	HFW
Aberystwyth Town	–	1–1	4–0
Carmarthen Town	1–1	–	0–1
Haverfordwest County	1–1	1–2	–

=== Group 2 ===
Team	Pld	W	D	L	GF	GA	GD	Pts
Neath Athletic	4	2	1	1	13	12	+1	7
Llanelli AFC	4	2	0	2	12	10	+2	6
Port Talbot Town	4	1	1	2	11	14	−3	4

	NEA	LLA	PTT
Neath Athletic	–	0–3	5–3
Llanelli AFC	3–5	–	2–4
Port Talbot Town	3–3	1–4	–

=== Group 3 ===
Team	Pld	W	D	L	GF	GA	GD	Pts
Newtown AFC	4	2	1	1	11	4	+7	7
NEWI Cefn Druids	4	2	1	1	7	7	+0	7
Caernarfon Town	4	0	2	2	4	11	−7	2

	NEW	DRU	CAER
Newtown AFC	–	2–3	7–1
NEWI Cefn Druids	0–2	–	3–2
Caernarfon Town	0–0	1–1	–

=== Group 4 ===
Team	Pld	W	D	L	GF	GA	GD	Pts
Caersws FC	4	2	2	0	13	7	+6	8
Bangor City	4	2	1	1	10	11	−1	7
CPD Porthmadog	4	0	1	3	5	10	−5	1

	CSWS	BAN	POR
Caersws FC	–	3–3	1–1
Bangor City	1–6	–	3–0
CPD Porthmadog	2–3	2–3	–

=== Group 5 ===
Team	Pld	W	D	L	GF	GA	GD	Pts
Rhyl FC	4	3	1	0	13	3	+10	9
Welshpool Town	4	2	0	2	7	7	+0	6
Airbus UK Broughton	4	1	0	3	5	15	−10	3

	RYL	WEL	AIR
Rhyl FC	–	1–2	6–1
Welshpool Town	0–2	–	5–2
Airbus UK Broughton	0–4	2–0	–

=== Group 6 ===
Team	Pld	W	D	L	GF	GA	GD	Pts
The New Saints	4	3	1	0	12	6	+6	10
Gap Connah's Quay	4	2	0	2	3	6	−3	6
Prestatyn Town	4	0	1	3	7	10	−3	1

	TNS	GCQ	PRE
The New Saints	–	3–0	3–3
Gap Connah's Quay	0–2	–	2–1
Prestatyn Town	3–4	0–1	–

== Knockout stage ==
=== Quarter-finals ===
Team 1	Score	Team 2
Bangor City	3–1 (aet)	Rhyl FC
NEWI Cefn Druids	0–2	The New Saints
Newtown AFC	1–1 (aet); 2–4 (pens)	Neath Athletic
Aberystwyth Town	4–1	Caersws FC

=== Semi-finals ===
Team 1	Agg.	Team 2	1st leg	2nd leg
Neath Athletic	2–3	The New Saints	2–0	0–3
Bangor City	5–4	Aberystwyth Town	1–2	4–2

=== Final ===
5 April 2009
13:00 (UTC+0)

The New Saints	2–0	Bangor City
John Leah 11' (p); Conall Murtagh 75'	Report

Latham Park, Newtown
Attendance: 555
Referee: Phil Southall (Wales)

Welsh League Cup
2008–09 Winners

The New Saints
Third Title

== See also ==
- Welsh League Cup
- Welsh Premier League
- Welsh Cup
