= 2023–24 Cymru Premier =

Cymru Premier Uwch Gynghrair Cymru
- Season: 2023–24
- Dates: 11 August 2023 – 11 May 2024
- Champions: The New Saints
- Relegated: Colwyn Bay; Pontypridd United
- UEFA Champions League: The New Saints
- UEFA Conference League: Bala Town; Caernarfon Town; Connah's Quay Nomads
- Matches: 192
- Goals: 566 (2.95 per match)
- Top goalscorer: Brad Young (22 goals)
- Biggest home win: The New Saints 8–0 Cardiff Metropolitan University (6 January 2024)
- Biggest away win: Caernarfon Town 1–8 The New Saints (23 February 2024)
- Highest scoring: Caernarfon Town 1–8 The New Saints (23 February 2024)
- Longest winning run: 26 – The New Saints (16 September 2023–21 April 2024)
- Longest unbeaten run: 32 – The New Saints (11 August 2023–21 April 2024)
- Longest winless run: 8 – Aberystwyth Town (12 August 2023–27 September 2023), Pontypridd United (17 October 2023–26 December 2023), Barry Town United (3 February 2024-13 April 2024)
- Longest losing run: 7 – Colwyn Bay (29 November 2023–9 February 2024)
- Highest attendance: 1411 – Colwyn Bay 0–4 Caernarfon Town (13 August 2023)
- Lowest attendance: 112 – Cardiff Metropolitan University 0–1 Bala Town (16 March 2024)
- Average attendance: 380 data missing for six games, average shown is the total of the available attendance data divided by 192

The 2023–24 Cymru Premier (Welsh: Uwch Gynghrair Cymru 2023–24; known as the JD Cymru Premier for sponsorship reasons) was the 32nd season of the Cymru Premier (formerly known as the Welsh Premier League), the highest football league within Wales since its establishment in 1992.

The winners (The New Saints, their third consecutive title win and sixteenth overall) qualified for the 2024–25 Champions League first qualifying round. The runners-up (Connah's Quay Nomads), third-placed team (Bala Town), and play-off winners (Caernarfon Town) qualified for the 2024–25 Conference League first qualifying round. The bottom two teams (Colwyn Bay and Pontypridd United) were relegated to either the 2024–25 Cymru North or the 2024–25 Cymru South.

== Teams ==
The league consisted of twelve teams; the top ten teams from the previous season, and one team each promoted from the second-tier leagues, the Cymru North and Cymru South. The New Saints entered the season as defending champions (for the second consecutive season).

The two promoted sides were Colwyn Bay (winners of the 2022–23 Cymru North) and Barry Town United (winners of the 2022–23 Cymru South). Barry Town United were promoted back to the top tier on the first time of asking following their relegation in the 2021–22 season, while Colwyn Bay were promoted to the top tier of Welsh football for the first time since switching from the English football league system in 2018–19.

The bottom two teams from the 2022–23 season (Airbus UK Broughton and Flint Town United) were both relegated to the Cymru North for the 2023–24 season. Flint Town United's relegation was only confirmed on the final day of the previous season, where a dramatic victory for Aberystwyth Town, combined with Flint's defeat to Pontypridd United, saw the Silkmen drop into the relegation zone.

Haverfordwest County came close to being relegated following their failure to achieve a Tier One license at the first time of asking, but their appeal was successful, ensuring their stay in the league.

=== Stadia and locations ===
Locations of the 2023–24 Cymru Premier teams

| Team | Location | Stadium | Capacity |
|---|---|---|---|
| Aberystwyth Town | Aberystwyth | Park Avenue | 5,000 |
| Bala Town | Bala | Maes Tegid | 3,000 |
| Barry Town United | Barry | Jenner Park Stadium | 2,650 |
| Caernarfon Town | Caernarfon | The Oval | 3,000 |
| Cardiff Metropolitan University | Cyncoed | Cyncoed Campus | 1,620 |
| Colwyn Bay | Old Colwyn | Llanelian Road | 2,500 |
| Connah's Quay Nomads | Flint | Cae-y-Castell | 3,000 |
| Haverfordwest County | Haverfordwest | Bridge Meadow Stadium | 2,100 |
| Newtown | Newtown | Latham Park | 5,000 |
| Penybont | Bridgend | Bryntirion Park | 3,000 |
| Pontypridd United | Treforest | USW Sports Park | 1,000 |
| The New Saints | (England) Oswestry | Park Hall | 2,034 |

=== Personnel and kits ===
| Team | Head coach | Captain | Kit manufacturer | Front shirt sponsor |
|---|---|---|---|---|
| Aberystwyth Town | (Wales) Anthony Williams | (England) Jack Thorn | Acerbis | Aberystwyth University |
| Bala Town | (England) Colin Caton | (England) Kieran Smith | Macron | Aykroyd's |
| Barry Town United | (Wales) Jonathan Jones | (Wales) Kayne McLaggon | Macron | RIM Motors |
| Caernarfon Town | (Wales) Richard Davies | (Wales) Darren Thomas | Errea | Gofal Bro Cyf |
| Cardiff Metropolitan University | (Wales) Ryan Jenkins | (Wales) Kyle McCarthy | Errea | Cardiff Metropolitan University |
| Colwyn Bay | (Wales) Steve Evans | (England) Tom McCready | Hope and Glory | GO2 People |
| Connah's Quay Nomads | (Wales) Neil Gibson | (Republic of Ireland) John Disney | Adidas | Castle Green Homes |
| Haverfordwest County | (Wales) Tony Pennock | (Wales) Dylan Rees | Macron | Clegg Gifford / The Athletic |
| Newtown | (Wales) Scott Ruscoe | (Wales) Shane Sutton | Errea | Control Techniques |
| Penybont | (Wales) Rhys Griffiths | (Wales) Kane Owen | Macron | Nathaniel Car Sales |
| Pontypridd United | (Wales) Gavin Allen | (Wales) Clayton Green | Joma | UPVCDIRECT.CO.UK |
| The New Saints | (England) Craig Harrison | (England) Chris Marriott | Macron | SiFi Networks |

=== Managerial changes ===
| Team | Outgoing manager | Manner of departure | Date of vacancy | Position in table | Incoming manager | Date of appointment |
|---|---|---|---|---|---|---|
| Barry Town United | (Wales) Lee Kendall | Resigned | 26 July 2023 | Pre-season | (Wales) Steve Jenkins | 5 August 2023 |
| Pontypridd United | (Wales) Andrew Stokes | Resigned | 4 January 2024 | 12th | (Wales) Gavin Allen | 22 January 2024 |
| Newtown | (Wales) Chris Hughes | Mutual consent | 10 January 2024 | 4th | (Wales) Scott Ruscoe | 18 January 2024 |
| Barry Town United | (Wales) Steve Jenkins | Changed to Director of Football | 2 February 2024 | 9th | (Wales) Jonathan Jones | 2 February 2024 |

== League table ==
| Pos | Team | Pld | W | D | L | GF | GA | GD | Pts | Qualification or relegation (Note: Teams played each other twice (22 matches), before the league was split into two groups (the top six and the bottom six).) |
|---|---|---|---|---|---|---|---|---|---|---|
| 1 | The New Saints (C) | 32 | 30 | 2 | 0 | 117 | 18 | +99 | 92 | Qualification for the Champions League first qualifying round |
| 2 | Connah's Quay Nomads | 32 | 18 | 5 | 9 | 70 | 43 | +27 | 59 | Qualification for the Conference League first qualifying round (Note: The 2023–24 Welsh Cup winners also qualified for the Conference League first qualifying round. Since the cup winners (Connah's Quay Nomads) qualified based on league position, the Conference League spot was passed to the third-placed team.) |
| 3 | Bala Town | 32 | 13 | 12 | 7 | 38 | 31 | +7 | 51 | Qualification for the Conference League first qualifying round |
| 4 | Newtown | 32 | 13 | 5 | 14 | 49 | 46 | +3 | 44 | Qualification for the Conference League first qualifying round play-off |
| 5 | Caernarfon Town (O) | 32 | 11 | 8 | 13 | 52 | 70 | −18 | 41 | Qualification for the Conference League first qualifying round play-off |
| 6 | Cardiff Metropolitan University | 32 | 10 | 9 | 13 | 35 | 63 | −28 | 36 (Note: Cardiff Metropolitan University were deducted three points for fielding an ineligible player against Bala Town on 3 February 2024.) | Qualification for the Conference League first qualifying round play-off |
| 7 | Penybont | 32 | 14 | 7 | 11 | 46 | 37 | +9 | 43 (Note: Penybont were deducted six points for fielding ineligible players.) | Qualification for the Conference League first qualifying round play-off |
| 8 | Haverfordwest County | 32 | 11 | 10 | 11 | 39 | 40 | −1 | 43 | |
| 9 | Barry Town United | 32 | 7 | 11 | 14 | 36 | 54 | −18 | 32 | |
| 10 | Aberystwyth Town | 32 | 7 | 6 | 19 | 27 | 57 | −30 | 27 | |
| 11 | Colwyn Bay (R) | 32 | 7 | 4 | 21 | 34 | 66 | −32 | 25 | Relegation to Cymru North |
| 12 | Pontypridd United (R) | 32 | 8 | 7 | 17 | 23 | 41 | −18 | 22 (Note: Pontypridd United were deducted nine points for failing to pay players on time, failing to comply with contractual player obligations, failing to register players correctly, and fielding ineligible players.) | Relegation to Cymru South |

Source: Cymru Premier
Rules for classification: 1) Points; 2) Goal difference; 3) Head-to-head points; 4) Goals scored; 5) Matches won.
(C) Champions; (O) Play-off winners; (R) Relegated

== Results ==
=== Matches 1–22 ===
Teams played each other twice, once at home and once away.

| Home \ Away | ABE | BAL | BAR | CAE | CMU | COL | CQN | HAV | NEW | PEN | PON | TNS |
|---|---|---|---|---|---|---|---|---|---|---|---|---|
| Aberystwyth Town | — | 2–3 | 2–4 | 2–4 | 0–1 | 1–0 | 1–1 | 1–1 | 0–1 | 1–2 | 0–1 | 1–3 |
| Bala Town | 0–1 | — | 1–0 | 1–1 | 0–1 | 2–1 | 1–0 | 2–0 | 2–1 | 2–1 | 0–0 | 0–0 |
| Barry Town United | 0–1 | 3–1 | — | 0–3 | 0–0 | 1–1 | 1–4 | 2–2 | 4–0 | 1–1 | 2–0 | 2–6 |
| Caernarfon Town | 3–0 | 1–1 | 2–3 | — | 5–1 | 2–1 | 0–4 | 0–1 | 2–1 | 2–4 | 1–0 | 1–3 |
| Cardiff Metropolitan University | 4–2 | 0–0 | 2–1 | 2–2 | — | 1–0 | 3–1 | 1–1 | 2–1 | 0–3 | 2–0 | 1–5 |
| Colwyn Bay | 3–1 | 2–3 | 0–1 | 0–4 | 2–2 | — | 2–3 | 1–2 | 2–4 | 2–1 | 2–3 | 0–1 |
| Connah's Quay Nomads | 4–0 | 1–1 | 7–0 | 6–1 | 4–0 | 2–1 | — | 1–2 | 3–1 | 4–2 | 3–1 | 0–4 |
| Haverfordwest County | 3–0 | 2–3 | 2–0 | 1–1 | 1–1 | 5–0 | 1–3 | — | 0–4 | 3–2 | 0–0 | 0–1 |
| Newtown | 0–0 | 1–0 | 2–0 | 4–0 | 2–1 | 4–2 | 1–2 | 1–1 | — | 1–3 | 3–1 | 0–2 |
| Penybont | 0–2 | 0–2 | 1–0 | 3–2 | 0–0 | 0–1 | 0–1 | 2–0 | 1–1 | — | 1–0 | 1–4 |
| Pontypridd United | 2–0 | 0–0 | 1–0 | 1–2 | 1–3 | 0–3 | 0–3 | 2–0 | 0–1 | 0–0 | — | 0–1 |
| The New Saints | 6–0 | 2–0 | 2–2 | 2–1 | 8–0 | 6–1 | 6–2 | 5–1 | 3–1 | 3–0 | 4–0 | — |

Source: Cymru Premier
Legend: Blue = home team win; Yellow = draw; Red = away team win.

=== Matches 23–32 ===
After 22 matches, the league split into two groups (the top six and the bottom six). Each team plays every other team in their group twice (once at home and once away).

==== Top six ====
| Home \ Away | BAL | CAE | CMU | CQN | NEW | TNS |
|---|---|---|---|---|---|---|
| Bala Town | — | 1–1 | 1–1 | 1–0 | 1–1 | 0–1 |
| Caernarfon Town | 2–2 | — | 1–2 | 2–1 | 1–0 | 1–8 |
| Cardiff Metropolitan University | 0–1 | 2–2 | — | 0–3 | 1–3 | 0–5 |
| Connah's Quay Nomads | 0–0 | 1–1 | 2–1 | — | 0–0 | 1–5 |
| Newtown | 1–5 | 5–0 | 2–0 | 2–3 | — | 0–1 |
| The New Saints | 4–1 | 7–1 | 4–0 | 2–0 | 3–0 | — |

Source: Cymru Premier
Legend: Blue = home team win; Yellow = draw; Red = away team win.

==== Bottom six ====
| Home \ Away | ABE | BAR | COL | HAV | PEN | PON |
|---|---|---|---|---|---|---|
| Aberystwyth Town | — | 1–1 | 0–1 | 1–0 | 0–3 | 3–0 |
| Barry Town United | 2–1 | — | 1–1 | 1–1 | 0–0 | 0–3 |
| Colwyn Bay | 1–2 | 1–0 | — | 0–0 | 1–2 | 1–0 |
| Haverfordwest County | 2–0 | 2–1 | 3–1 | — | 0–1 | 1–1 |
| Penybont | 1–1 | 2–2 | 5–0 | 1–0 | — | 0–1 |
| Pontypridd United | 0–0 | 1–1 | 4–0 | 0–1 | 0–3 | — |

Source: Cymru Premier
Legend: Blue = home team win; Yellow = draw; Red = away team win.

== Conference League play-off ==
Teams placed 3rd–7th will enter one-off play-off matches for the third spot in the Conference League first qualifying round. The higher-placed team gains home advantage. Since the 2023–24 Welsh Cup winners finished in the top three, the 3rd-placed team qualified automatically for the Conference League and the spot was vacated.

=== Semi-finals ===
| 10 May 2024 | Caernarfon Town (5th) | 2–0 | Cardiff Metropolitan University (6th) | Caernarfon |
| 19:45 | | | | Stadium: The Oval |

| 11 May 2024 | Newtown (4th) | 0–5 | Penybont (7th) | Newtown |
| 12:20 | | | Kircough 6', 64'; Venables 18', 33'; Little 74' | Stadium: Latham Park |

=== Final ===
| 18 May 2024 | Caernarfon Town (5th) | 3–1 | Penybont (7th) | Caernarfon |
| 14:45 | Lloyd 20'; Clarke 26'; Bradley 37' | | Reynolds 90+1' | Stadium: The Oval; Attendance: 1,960 |

== Season statistics ==
As of 18 April 2024

=== Top scorers ===
| Rank | Player | Club | Goals |
|---|---|---|---|
| 1 | (England) Brad Young | The New Saints | 22 |
| 2 | (Wales) Jordan Davies | Connah's Quay | 19 |
| 3 | (England) Aaron Williams | Newtown | 18 |
| 4 | (Wales) Chris Venables | Penybont | 17 |
| 5 | (Northern Ireland) Ryan Brobbel | The New Saints | 14 |
| 5 | (Wales) Adam Davies | Caernarfon Town | 14 |
| 7 | (Scotland) Declan McManus | The New Saints | 13 |
| 8 | (England) George Newell | Bala Town | 12 |
| 9 | (England) Ollie Hulbert | Barry Town United | 11 |
| 9 | (England) Ben Clark | The New Saints | 11 |
| 9 | (Poland) Adrian Cieślewicz | The New Saints | 11 |

=== Hat-tricks ===
| Player | For | Against | Result | Date |
|---|---|---|---|---|
| (Northern Ireland) Ryan Brobbel | The New Saints | Haverfordwest County | 5–1 (H) | 16 September 2023 |
| (England) Aaron Williams | Newtown | Caernarfon Town | 4–0 (H) | 7 October 2023 |
| (England) Brad Young | The New Saints | Barry Town United | 2–6 (A) | 21 October 2023 |
| (Wales) Sion Bradley | Caernarfon Town | Cardiff Met | 5–1 (H) | 21 October 2023 |
| (England) Harry Franklin | Connah's Quay | Caernarfon Town | 6–1 (H) | 27 October 2023 |
| (Wales) Chris Venables | Penybont | Caernarfon Town | 2–4 (A) | 4 November 2023 |
| (England) Martell Taylor-Crossdale | Haverfordwest County | Colwyn Bay | 5–0 (H) | 4 November 2023 |
| (England) Brad Young | The New Saints | Cardiff Met | 8–0 (H) | 6 January 2024 |
| (England) Brad Young | The New Saints | Caernarfon Town | 1–8 (A) | 23 February 2024 |
| (England) George Newell | Newtown | Bala Town | 1–5 (A) | 24 February 2024 |
| (England) Brad Young | The New Saints | Cardiff Met | 4–0 (H) | 2 March 2024 |

Notes

(H) – Home team
(A) – Away team

=== Monthly awards ===
| Month | Manager of the Month | | Player of the Month | |
| Month | Manager | Club | Player | Club |
|---|---|---|---|---|
| August | Richard Davies | Caernarfon Town | Sion Bradley | Caernarfon Town |
| September | Chris Hughes | Newtown | Jordan Davies | Connah's Quay |
| October | Craig Harrison | The New Saints | Ben Nash | Connah's Quay |
| November | Tony Pennock | Haverfordwest County | Ryan Sears | Newtown |
| December | Craig Harrison | The New Saints | Josh Pask | The New Saints |
| January | Steve Jenkins | Barry Town United | Brad Young | The New Saints |
| February | Gavin Allen | Pontypridd United | Ben Ahmun | Pontypridd United |
| March | Richard Davies | Caernarfon Town | Rhys Abbruzzese | Haverfordwest County |
| April | Chris Venables | Penybont | Rhys Griffiths | Penybont |

=== Annual awards ===
| Award | Winner | Club |
|---|---|---|
| Manager of the Season | Craig Harrison | The New Saints |
| Player of the Season | Sion Bradley | Caernarfon Town |
| Young Player of the Season | Brad Young | The New Saints |

Team of the Season
| Goalkeeper | (Wales) Kelland Absalom (Bala Town) | | | | |
| Defenders | (Wales) Ryan Sears (Newtown) | (Wales) Ben Nash (Connah's Quay Nomads) | (Wales) Danny Davies (The New Saints) | (Wales) Rhys Abbruzzese (Haverfordwest County) | |
| Midfielders | (Wales) Leo Smith (The New Saints) | | (England) Daniel Redmond (The New Saints) | | (Wales) Danny Gosset (Caernarfon Town) |
| Forwards | (Wales) Jordan Davies (Connah's Quay Nomads) | | (England) Brad Young (The New Saints) | | (Wales) Sion Bradley (Caernarfon Town) |

=== Attendances ===
| Team | Highest | Lowest | Average |
|---|---|---|---|
| Aberystwyth Town | 824 | 271 | 370 |
| Bala Town | 564 | 138 | 292* |
| Barry Town United | 521 | 243 | 426 |
| Caernarfon Town | 978 | 339 | 576 |
| Cardiff Metropolitan University | 563 | 112 | 248* |
| Colwyn Bay | 1,411 | 422 | 714 |
| Connah's Quay Nomads | 506 | 139 | 268 |
| Haverfordwest County | 698 | 308 | 458 |
| Newtown | 421 | 181 | 298 |
| Penybont | 863 | 175 | 311* |
| Pontypridd United | 537 | 191 | 279* |
| The New Saints | 532 | 161 | 322 |

Figures taken from FAW Cymru Football app and other club channels. Correct as of 22 April 2024. *Denotes incomplete record, as missing attendance figures. Figures for Penybont v Caernarfon (16/9), Pontypridd v Bala (16/9), Bala v Aberystwyth (27/9), Penybont v TNS (7/10), Penybont v Aberystwyth (27/10) and Cardiff Met v Connah's Quay (6/4) have not been publicly recorded. Average attendances for these teams are calculated on basis of available attendance data divided by total number of home games played
