= 2007–08 Welsh League Cup =

Loosemores League Cup

Tournament details
- Country: Wales; England
- Teams: 18

Final positions
- Champions: Llanelli FC
- Runners-up: Rhyl FC

Tournament statistics
- Matches played: 45
- Goals scored: 160 (3.56 per match)
- All statistics correct as of 20:00, 30 August 2009 (UTC).

The 2007–08 Welsh League Cup season was won by Llanelli FC, beating Rhyl FC in the final. It was the first victory for Llanelli FC in the competition, and the fifth appearance by Rhyl FC in the final. The final took place at Latham Park, in Newtown, Wales. The match was refereed by Steve Hames.

== Round and draw dates ==
Date	Event
11 August 2007	Group stage, round 1
4 September 2007	Group stage, round 2
25–26 September 2007	Group stage, round 3
9–10 October 2007	Group stage, round 4
16 October – 13 November 2007	Group stage, round 5
28 October – 13 November 2007	Group stage, round 6
27 November 2007	Quarter-finals
29 January 2008	Semi-finals, first leg
12–13 February 2008	Semi-finals, second leg
27 April 2008	Final in Latham Park, Newtown

== Group stage ==
Key to colours in group tables
Teams progressed to the quarter-finals
Best runner-up that progressed to the quarter-finals

=== Group 1 ===
Team	Pld	W	D	L	GF	GA	GD	Pts
Llangefni Town	4	4	0	0	10	4	+6	12
CPD Porthmadog	4	1	1	2	8	8	0	4
Caernarfon Town	4	0	1	3	7	13	−6	1

	CAER	LGFT	POR
Caernarfon Town	–	2–3	2–2
Llangefni Town	3–1	–	2–0
CPD Porthmadog	5–2	1–2	–

=== Group 2 ===
Team	Pld	W	D	L	GF	GA	GD	Pts
Rhyl FC	4	3	1	0	10	3	+7	10
Bangor City	4	2	1	1	8	2	+6	7
Connah's Quay Nomads	4	0	0	4	2	15	−13	0

	BAN	CQN	RHY
Bangor City	–	4–0	0–1
Connah's Quay Nomads	0–3	–	1–2
Rhyl FC	1–1	6–1	–

=== Group 3 ===
Team	Pld	W	D	L	GF	GA	GD	Pts
The New Saints	4	3	0	1	7	4	+3	9
NEWI Cefn Druids	4	2	1	1	3	2	+1	7
Airbus UK Broughton	4	0	1	3	2	6	−4	1

	AIR	NCD	TNS
Airbus UK	–	0–0	2–3
NEWI Cefn Druids	1–0	–	2–1
The New Saints	2–0	1–0	–

=== Group 4 ===
Team	Pld	W	D	L	GF	GA	GD	Pts
Welshpool Town	4	2	2	0	8	5	+3	8
Caersws FC	4	2	1	1	10	6	+4	7
Newtown AFC	4	0	1	3	3	10	−7	1

	CSWS	NEW	WEL
Caersws FC	–	2–0	0–0
Newtown AFC	1–5	–	2–2
Welshpool Town	5–3	1–0	–

=== Group 5 ===
Team	Pld	W	D	L	GF	GA	GD	Pts
Carmarthen Town	4	3	1	0	17	4	+13	10
Aberystwyth Town	4	2	1	1	10	5	+5	7
Haverfordwest County	4	0	0	4	3	21	−18	0

	ABER	CARM	HFWC
Aberystwyth Town	–	1–1	6–0
Carmarthen Town	3–1	–	8–1
Haverfordwest County	1–2	1–5	–

=== Group 6 ===
Team	Pld	W	D	L	GF	GA	GD	Pts
Llanelli FC	4	3	0	1	12	7	+5	9
Neath Athletic	4	2	0	2	7	9	−2	6
Port Talbot Town	4	1	0	3	8	11	−3	2

	NEA	LLA	PTT
Neath Athletic	–	1–3	3–2
Llanelli FC	1–3	–	3–1
Port Talbot Town	3–0	2–5	–

== Knockout stage ==
=== Quarter-finals ===
Team 1	Score	Team 2
Carmarthen Town	0–3	Aberystwyth Town
Llanelli AFC	2–0	Welshpool Town
Llangefni Town	2–5	Rhyl FC
The New Saints	1–2	Bangor City

=== Semi-finals ===
Team 1	Agg.	Team 2	1st leg	2nd leg
Bangor City	1–3	Rhyl FC	1–1	0–2
Aberystwyth Town	2–2(a)	Llanelli AFC	2–1	0–1

=== Final ===
27 April 2008
14:30 (UTC+0)

Llanelli AFC	2–0	Rhyl FC
Andrew Mumford 15'; Chris Holloway 40'	Report

Latham Park, Newtown
Attendance: 510
Referee: Steve Hames (Wales)

Welsh League Cup
2007–08 Winners

Llanelli AFC
First Title

== See also ==
- Welsh League Cup
- Welsh Premier League
- Welsh Cup
