= Rhys Griffiths (footballer) =

Welsh footballer and manager

Personal information
- Full name: Rhys Griffiths
- Date of birth: 1 March 1980 (age 46)
- Place of birth: Cardiff, Wales
- Height: 6 ft 2 in (1.88 m)
- Position: Forward

Team information
- Current team: Penybont (manager)

Senior career*
Years	Team	Apps	(Gls)
2001–2002	Cwmbrân Town	22	(1)
2002–2004	Haverfordwest County	57	(19)
2004	Carmarthen Town	9	(2)
2004–2006	Port Talbot Town	51	(35)
2006–2012	Llanelli	181	(180)
2012	Port Talbot Town	0	(0)
2012–2013	Plymouth Argyle	11	(3)
2013	Newport County	10	(0)
2013–2015	Port Talbot Town	48	(25)
2015–2016	Aberystwyth Town	21	(7)
2016–2025	Penybont	13	(3)

International career
2007–2008	Wales semi-professional	6	(1)

Managerial career
- 2016–: Penybont
- * Club domestic league appearances and goals as of 26 January 2023 (UTC)

Rhys Griffiths (born 1 March 1980) is a Welsh footballer and manager of Cymru Premier side Penybont.

An aggressive target man and goal-getter, Rhys dominated the Welsh Premier scoring charts for the best part of a decade. Although he boasts the best goal scoring ratio, Rhys is second in the all-time list of Welsh Premier League scorers with 271 goals in 343 appearances, 47 behind Marc Lloyd Williams. He finished as top scorer in seven consecutive seasons, and was included in the Welsh Premier League's team of the season six times. The only three-time winner of the league's Player of the Year award, Griffiths was capped six times by Wales at semi-professional level.

Griffiths combined his role as a part-time footballer with being a firefighter in the South Wales Fire and Rescue Service before signing his first professional contract with Plymouth Argyle in 2012. Prior to making his debut in the Football League, Griffiths played for Cwmbrân Town, Haverfordwest County, Carmarthen Town, Port Talbot Town and Llanelli.

== Club career ==
=== Welsh Premier League ===
Griffiths played for the first time in the League of Wales in the 2001–02 season for Cwmbrân Town. At the beginning of the following season he moved to Haverfordwest County. In July 2004, Griffiths switched to Carmarthen Town before he signed with Port Talbot Town in December 2004. In the 2005–06 season he was the top scorer in the Welsh Premier League with 28 league goals for Port Talbot Town.

Griffiths relocated again to Llanelli for the 2006–07 season and he was again Welsh Premier League top scorer with 30 goals. In the 2007–08 season he was again league top scorer, with 40 goals and his club Llanelli become the Welsh Premier League champions for first time in the club's history. Griffiths scored a hat-trick in a 2007 UEFA Intertoto Cup first round tie against Lithuanian A Lyga club Vėtra in July 2007. Llanelli won the match but lost on away goals after the tie finished 6–6 on aggregate.

In December 2007, Griffiths had a trial with Swiss Super League club Aarau, saying that "Llanelli and Aarau have a link up so what happens next is in the lap of the gods." He signed a new two-year contract with Llanelli the following month. His last season with Llanelli in 2011–12 saw him win the Golden Boot award for the sixth time, scoring two more than Greg Draper of The New Saints. After six seasons with Llanelli, where he scored 180 goals in 181 league appearances, Griffiths rejoined Port Talbot Town in June 2012.

=== English leagues ===
Griffiths joined Football League club Plymouth Argyle on trial in July, and scored the only goal in a pre-season friendly win at Truro City. He signed a one-year contract with the club in August to become a professional football player for the first time at the age of 32. "Being my age, it gives me the opportunity to grasp it with both hands, rather than think I've got years to come. I've got to make the most of it now," said Griffiths. "For some reason, it dawned on me in the summer that I've never played league football, and I should have." Having been a firefighter for seven and a half years, Griffiths had to request a sabbatical from work. "It's a great opportunity for me and it's a chance to realise a dream, really. My sabbatical from work can be for a maximum of two years and a minimum of six months." He added that "ultimately, my goal was always to be a fireman or a footballer."

He scored on his debut in a 3–2 win against Northampton Town in September. Having recovered from a calf injury suffered at the start of the season, Griffiths came on as a half-time substitute and scored with "a confident finish" before returning to the bench to receive treatment for a recurrence of the injury. His goal in a 4–1 win at Barnet in October took his tally to three in his first five league appearances, ruining Edgar Davids start as manager. "I prefer to think of it as three goals in two starts, rather than five games," said Griffiths, who donated the fee he received for an interview on Soccer Saturday that weekend to Bobath Children's Therapy Centre Wales. "In the Welsh Premier League I had a reputation and I had to score goals. Here, I just want the team to win. I would love to be the one who scores every goal but, ultimately, as long as we are winning I'm happy." Griffiths failed to score again over the next two months and, after making 17 appearances in league and cup competition, was told that he was free to leave the club by new manager John Sheridan. He had his contract cancelled by mutual consent in January 2013.

Griffiths joined Newport County in February 2013. "Rhys is a proven goalscorer and when we knew that he could become available we kept an eye on the situation," said County manager Justin Edinburgh. "We're delighted to have him on board going into a crucial part of the season." In the 2012,13 season his opportunities were limited due to requiring a hernia operation, but he was part of the Newport squad that finished third in the league, making ten appearances, to qualify for the Conference Premier play-offs. The club defeated Wrexham 2–0 in play-off final at Wembley Stadium to return to the Football League after a 25-year absence with promotion to League Two. In July 2013, Griffiths' contract with Newport County was cancelled by mutual consent.

=== Return to Port Talbot ===
He began a third stint with Port Talbot Town later in July, twelve months after leaving the club to join Plymouth Argyle. "There were quite a few [offers from other clubs]. It's nice to feel that I'm still wanted but I narrowed it down to two in the end and I felt [joining Port Talbot] would be the right thing to do," Griffiths said on the club's website. On 14 March 2014 Griffiths broke the all time Welsh league record of most goals in a game scoring seven against Afan Lido.

=== Aberystwyth Town ===
Another injury cursed season followed this time at Aberystwyth Town F.C., where he scored seven goals in 21 appearances.

=== Penybont ===
In 2016 he became player-manager of recently formed Bridgend club Penybont F.C. Penybont had avoided relegation from Welsh League Division 1 on goal difference the season before Griffiths took over (a single goal). In his first season the club finished runners up (to Barry Town), and lost in the quarter-final of the Welsh Cup to eventual winners Bala Town. His assistant manager is ex Cardiff City and Hereford defender Martyn Giles.

Whilst at the club he played for the club, most recently appearing in the Cymru Premier in August 2022 when as a substitute he scored the winning goal in a match against Flint Town United. Later that season a game in the Welsh League Cup marked his final first team appearance for the club. During the subsequent three seasons he named himself as an unused substitute on numerous occasions, the most recent time being an Cymru Premier match against Caernarfon Town in September 2025.

== International career ==
Griffiths was capped six times by the Wales semi-professional team. He received his first call-up for the 2007 edition of the Four Nations Tournament that was held in Scotland. Griffiths made his debut against Scotland on 22 May 2007 and scored the decisive goal from the penalty spot in a 1–0 win at Victoria Park. He also played in a 1–1 draw with the Republic of Ireland at Dudgeon Park three days later, and a 3–0 defeat to England C at Grant Street Park on 27 May. Wales finished second in the tournament. In the 2008 edition that was held in Wales, Griffiths had a goal disallowed for offside in a 1–1 draw with Scotland at Belle Vue on 20 May 2008. He also played in a 6–2 win against Gibraltar two days later, and a 3–0 defeat to England C on 24 May. Wales finished second again.

== Honours ==
=== Club ===
- Welsh League Cup: 2007–08
- Welsh Premier League: 2007–08
- Welsh Cup: 2010–11

=== Individual ===
- Welsh Premier League Player of the Year: 2005–06, 2007–08, 2010–11
- Welsh Premier League team of the season: 2005–06, 2006–07, 2007–08, 2008–09, 2009–10, 2010–11
- Welsh Premier League top scorer: 2005–06, 2006–07, 2007–08, 2008–09, 2009–10, 2010–11, 2011–12
