= Andy Cale =

English psychologist and football coach

Andrew Cale is an English sports psychologist and former football coach. He managed Rhyl, TNS and Newtown in the Cymru Premier, winning two titles with TNS in 2000 and 2010. He was named head of player development at the Football Association in 2006, after having worked as an assistant coach for the youth teams.

== Career ==
Formerly an England youth international, Cale has a doctorate in sports science and sports psychology from Loughborough University. He was a player development advisor and sports psychologist for Sheffield United.

Cale began working for the Football Association in 1998 as a sports psychologist and youth team assistant coach, and was named head of player development in 2006. During Sven-Göran Eriksson's time as manager in the 2000s, he designed the coaching and educational structure of the national teams.

Cale was manager of Rhyl in the first season of the League of Wales in 1992–93. In 1998, he was appointed at TNS, winning their first league title in 2000. He succeeded Ken McKenna for a second spell as manager in March 2008. In 2008–09, the team won the Welsh League Cup with a 2–0 final win over Bangor City at Latham Park. After winning the league title in 2009–10, he stood down.

In August 2010, Cale was hired by Newtown. On 14 August, he won his first game 1–0 at Haverfordwest County. He left the club at the end of his only season.

After his coaching career, Cale became a lecturer at the University of Worcester, having previously lectured at Staffordshire University. In 2013 he was named senior football development manager in Qatar ahead of the 2022 FIFA World Cup.
