= 2010–11 Welsh Premier League =

Welsh Premier League
- Season: 2010–11
- Champions: Bangor City
- Relegated: Haverfordwest County
- Champions League: Bangor City
- Europa League: The New Saints; Llanelli AFC; Neath
- Matches: 186
- Goals: 639 (3.44 per match)
- Top goalscorer: Rhys Griffiths (25)
- Biggest home win: Bangor City 8–1 Port Talbot Town; The New Saints 7–0 Carmarthen Town
- Biggest away win: Haverfordwest County 0–4 Llanelli AFC; Neath 0–4 Llanelli AFC
- Highest scoring: Bangor City 8–1 Port Talbot Town

The 2010–11 Welsh Premier League was the 19th season of the Welsh Premier League since its establishment in 1992 as the League of Wales. It was reduced to a size of 12 teams from this season following a unanimous decision by the Premier League clubs in June 2009. The league season began on 13 August 2010 and ended on 30 April 2011. The New Saints were the defending champions, but lost their crown to Bangor City.

== Teams ==
Rhyl were denied the domestic licence for competing in this season's Welsh Premier League and were therefore relegated to the second tier. Welsh Premier League aspirants Llangefni Town (Cymru Alliance) and Afan Lido (Welsh Football League First Division) were also denied licences meaning that no team from the second tier was promoted. Since these three teams failed to obtain licences, the best three teams originally to be relegated, with all three obtaining their licences, were spared from relegation (Bala Town, Haverfordwest County and Newtown). Rhyl became the third Championship winning side to be relegated after Barry Town and Cwmbran Town. Rhyl had had the highest home attendances in the league for the last seven seasons.

=== Team summaries ===

Team	Ground	Capacity
Aberystwyth Town	Park Avenue	5,500
Airbus UK Broughton	The Airfield	2,100
Bala Town	Maes Tegid	3,000
Bangor City	Farrar Road Stadium	1,500
Carmarthen Town	Richmond Park	3,000
Haverfordwest County	Bridge Meadow Stadium	2,000
Llanelli AFC	Stebonheath Park	3,700
Neath	The Gnoll	7,000
Newtown AFC	Latham Park	5,000
Port Talbot Town	Victoria Road	2,500
Prestatyn Town	Bastion Road	2,500
The New Saints	Park Hall	2,000

=== Managerial changes ===
Team	Outgoing manager	Manner of departure	Date of vacancy	Incoming manager	Date of appointment
Newtown	(England) Darren Ryan	Stepped down	4 August 2010	(England) Andy Cale	7 August 2010
Haverfordwest County	(Republic of Ireland) Derek Brazil	Sacked	15 November 2010	(Wales) Gavin Chesterfield	26 November 2010
Haverfordwest County	(Wales) Gavin Chesterfield	Resigned	28 February 2011	(Republic of Ireland) Derek Brazil	28 February 2011

== League table ==
Pos	Team	Pld	W	D	L	GF	GA	GD	Pts	Qualification or relegation
1	Bangor City (C)	32	22	4	6	80	44	+36	70	Qualification for Champions League second qualifying round
2	The New Saints	32	20	8	4	87	34	+53	68	Qualification for Europa League first qualifying round
3	Neath (O)	32	16	10	6	62	41	+21	58	Qualification for Europa League play-offs
4	Llanelli	32	15	8	9	58	41	+17	53	Qualification for Europa League second qualifying round (Note: Winners of 2010–11 Welsh Cup)
5	Prestatyn Town	32	10	10	12	44	46	−2	40	Qualification for Europa League play-offs
6	Port Talbot Town	32	8	12	12	37	48	−11	36	Qualification for Europa League play-offs
7	Aberystwyth Town	32	11	9	12	42	54	−12	42	Qualification for Europa League play-offs
8	Airbus UK Broughton	32	11	8	13	53	52	+1	41	Qualification for Europa League play-offs
9	Newtown	32	8	11	13	40	55	−15	35	
10	Carmarthen Town	32	10	5	17	39	64	−25	35	
11	Bala Town	32	10	3	19	41	57	−16	33	Spared from relegation (Note: Bala Town were spared from relegation after 2010–11 Cymru Alliance champions Connah's Quay Nomads were denied a Premier League licence for the 2011–12 season.)
12	Haverfordwest County (R)	32	5	4	23	30	77	−47	19	Relegation to Welsh Division One

Source: BBC
Rules for classification: 1) points; 2) goal difference; 3) number of goals scored.
(C) Champions; (O) Play-off winners; (R) Relegated

== Results ==
Teams played each other twice on a home and away basis, before the league split into two groups - the top six and the bottom six. Clubs in these groups played each other twice again to bring the total fixture count to 32. This meant a decrease in fixtures from 34 games to 32 from the previous season.

=== Matches 1–22 ===
Home \ Away	ABE	AIR	BAL	BAN	CMR	HAV	LLA	NEA	NEW	PTA	PRE	TNS
Aberystwyth Town		2–1	2–1	1–3	2–2	0–2	0–2	1–1	2–2	2–2	1–0	0–2
Airbus UK Broughton	3–1		1–2	1–1	2–4	4–0	1–2	2–2	1–1	2–0	3–4	2–2
Bala Town	2–3	1–2		2–3	1–2	0–1	1–0	0–2	4–1	0–0	2–1	3–4
Bangor City	2–1	5–1	3–0		5–0	6–0	2–0	2–1	5–2	8–1	2–1	4–3
Carmarthen Town	2–3	1–4	4–1	0–1		2–2	1–3	0–3	1–1	1–3	2–1	1–3
Haverfordwest County	0–0	4–0	0–1	1–2	3–2		0–4	0–3	0–1	0–1	2–3	1–4
Llanelli	2–3	1–1	3–1	2–0	4–1	2–1		1–4	2–1	0–3	2–2	2–1
Neath	1–1	1–0	3–1	1–2	2–1	4–0	1–1		5–0	2–1	2–1	1–1
Newtown	0–0	2–3	1–1	0–1	0–1	1–1	0–0	3–6		0–0	1–0	2–2
Port Talbot Town	1–1	2–0	2–0	1–2	1–2	3–0	1–1	1–3	3–0		0–3	0–2
Prestatyn Town	4–0	1–1	2–0	4–2	0–0	1–0	1–1	1–1	2–1	1–1		0–0
The New Saints	5–0	2–0	2–1	2–2	7–0	6–1	2–0	3–1	4–0	6–1	5–2	

Source: Welsh Premiership Football League
Legend: Blue = home team win; Yellow = draw; Red = away team win.

=== Matches 23–32 ===
Top six

Home \ Away	BAN	LLA	NEA	PTA	PRE	TNS
Bangor City		2–5	1–2	2–2	1–2	1–0
Llanelli	2–2		4–0	2–3	3–0	0–2
Neath	1–2	0–4		0–0	1–1	2–2
Port Talbot Town	1–2	0–0	1–2		1–1	0–0
Prestatyn Town	1–2	1–2	1–1	2–0		0–2
The New Saints	3–2	3–1	2–3	1–1	4–0	

Source: Welsh Premiership Football League
Legend: Blue = home team win; Yellow = draw; Red = away team win.

Bottom six

Home \ Away	ABE	AIR	BAL	CMR	HAV	NEW
Aberystwyth Town		2–0	1–2	1–0	2–1	2–2
Airbus UK Broughton	5–3		1–1	0–0	5–0	0–3
Bala Town	2–1	0–3		4–0	2–0	0–2
Carmarthen Town	0–1	1–2	3–1		1–0	2–1
Haverfordwest County	1–3	0–2	2–3	2–1		1–4
Newtown	1–0	1–0	2–1	0–1	4–4	

Source: Welsh Premiership Football League
Legend: Blue = home team win; Yellow = draw; Red = away team win.

== UEFA Europa League play-offs ==
As Llanelli AFC had already been assured of a Europa League spot by virtue of playing in the 2010–11 Welsh Cup Final against Champions-League qualified Bangor City, third-placed Neath and fifth- through eighth-placed sides Port Talbot Town, Prestatyn Town, Aberystwyth Town and Airbus UK Broughton competed in the inaugural play-offs for the second 2011–12 UEFA Europa League spot available via league placement. The winners of this play-off would go on to enter the Europa League in the first qualifying round.

=== Quarterfinal ===
Aberystwyth Town and Airbus UK Broughton, as worst-placed teams of the play-off participants, had to compete an extra match in order to reduce the teams for the semi-finals to four. The winners of this match would face Neath in the semi-final.

10 May 2011
19:30 BST

Aberystwyth Town	2–1	Airbus UK Broughton
Stott 60'; McCarten 85'	Report	21' (pen.) Sheridan

Park Avenue, Aberystwyth
Attendance: 424

=== Semifinals ===
The semi-finals were held simultaneously on 15 May. Aberystwyth Town, having beaten Airbus, faced third-placed Neath in the first, while fifth-placed Prestatyn faced off against sixth-placed Port Talbot in the other.

15 May 2011
14:30 BST

Neath	2–1	Aberystwyth Town
Hughes 34'; Fowler 36'	Report	89' McCarten

The Gnoll, Neath
Attendance: 410
Referee: Huw Jones

15 May 2011
14:30 BST

Prestatyn Town	2–1	Port Talbot Town
Hunt 84'; Hayes 88'	Report	29' Surman

Remax Stadium, Port Talbot
Attendance: 383
Referee: Lee Evans

=== Final ===
The final was held at Neath's Gnoll, as they had finished higher than Prestatyn in the league and had therefore 'earned' home advantage. Neath won the game 3-2 and will play in the Europa League next season as a result.

21 May 2011
15:15 UTC±0

Neath	3–2	Prestatyn Town
Bond 1'; Hill 55', 84'		25' Hunt; 90' Fisher-Cooke

The Gnoll, Neath
Attendance: 988
Referee: Kevin Morgan

== Top goalscorers ==
Including matches played on 18 February 2011; Source: Soccerway

Rank	Scorer	Team	Goals
1	(Wales) Jamie Reed	Bangor City	17
1	(Wales) Rhys Griffiths	Llanelli AFC	17
3	(Wales) Matty Williams	The New Saints	16
4	(England) Lee Trundle	Neath	15
5	(England) Alan Bull	Bangor City	12
5	(England) Lee Hunt	Prestatyn Town	12
7	(Wales) Alex Darlington	The New Saints	11
7	(Republic of Ireland) Richie Partridge	The New Saints	11
9	(England) Andy Moran	Airbus UK Broughton	10
9	(England) Dave Morley	Bangor City	10
