= 2011–12 Welsh Premier League =

Welsh Premier League
- Season: 2011–12
- Champions: TNS
- Relegated: Neath
- Champions League: TNS
- Europa League: Bangor City; Llanelli; Cefn Druids (via cup)
- Matches played: 192
- Goals scored: 608 (3.17 per match)
- Biggest home win: Llanelli 9–2 Newtown
- Biggest away win: Neath 1–5 Llanelli; Aberystwyth Town 0–4 Bala Town; Newtown 0–4 Neath; Prestatyn 0–4 TNS; Newtown 0–4 Airbus
- Highest scoring: Llanelli 9–2 Newtown

The 2011–12 Welsh Premier League season was the 20th season of the Welsh Premier League, the highest football league of Wales since its establishment in 1992. Bangor City were the defending champions, but lost their title to The New Saints in a meeting on the final game of the season.

== Teams ==
Haverfordwest County were relegated to the 2011–12 Football League Division One at the end of the 2010–11 season after finishing at the bottom of the table. The club thus ended a fourteen-year tenure in the league. They were replaced by 2010–11 Football League runners-up Afan Lido, who returned to the Premier League after six seasons.

Originally, Bala Town as 11th-placed team were going to be relegated as well; however, they were eventually spared as 2010–11 Cymru Alliance champions Connah's Quay Nomads were denied a Premier League licence.

=== Stadia and location ===
Location of teams in 2011–2012 Welsh Premier League

Team	Stadium	Capacity
Aberystwyth Town	Park Avenue	5,500
Afan Lido	Marston Stadium	4,200
Airbus UK Broughton	The Airfield	2,100
Bala Town	Maes Tegid	3,000
Bangor City	Nantporth	3,000
Carmarthen Town	Richmond Park	3,000
Llanelli AFC	Stebonheath Park	3,700
Neath	The Gnoll	7,000
Newtown AFC	Latham Park	5,000
Port Talbot Town	Victoria Road	2,500
Prestatyn Town	Bastion Road	2,500
The New Saints	Park Hall	2,500

== League table ==
Pos	Team	Pld	W	D	L	GF	GA	GD	Pts	Qualification or relegation
1	The New Saints (C)	32	23	5	4	75	31	+44	74	Qualification for Champions League second qualifying round
2	Bangor City	32	22	3	7	72	45	+27	69	Qualification for Europa League first qualifying round
3	Neath (R)	32	18	8	6	60	36	+24	62	Relegated (Note: Neath were relegated on 27 April 2012, after failing in their Domestic and UEFA Competitions Licensing appeal, meaning they were relegated from the Welsh Premier League. Newtown would have been relegated otherwise.)
4	Llanelli (O)	32	18	5	9	63	36	+27	59	Qualification for Europa League play-offs
5	Bala Town	32	14	7	11	48	41	+7	49	Qualification for Europa League play-offs
6	Prestatyn Town	32	8	4	20	41	63	−22	28	Qualification for Europa League play-offs
7	Airbus UK Broughton	32	10	9	13	48	50	−2	39	Qualification for Europa League play-offs
8	Aberystwyth Town (Note: Aberystwyth Town deducted 1 point for fielding ineligible player)	32	8	10	14	44	50	−6	33	Qualification for Europa League play-offs
9	Port Talbot Town	32	8	9	15	39	51	−12	33	
10	Afan Lido	32	7	11	14	40	55	−15	32	
11	Carmarthen Town	32	10	2	20	33	67	−34	32	
12	Newtown (Note: Newtown deducted 3 points for fielding ineligible players.)	32	7	5	20	44	82	−38	23	Spared from relegation (Note: Haverfordwest County would have replaced Newtown AFC should they have finished second in a feeder league, and thus gaining promotion. A win for Taffs Well in a game Vs Caerau Ely meant this could not happen, sparing Newtown's relegation.)

Source: Welsh Premier^{[usurped]}
Rules for classification: 1) points; 2) goal difference; 3) number of goals scored.
Cefn Druids, playing in the 2011–12 Cymru Alliance, will qualify for the first qualifying round of the 2012–13 UEFA Europa League, even though they lost to The New Saints (themselves qualifiers for the UEFA Champions League), in the final of the 2011–12 Welsh Cup.
(C) Champions; (O) Play-off winners; (R) Relegated

== Results ==
Teams played each other twice on a home and away basis, before the league was split into two groups at the end of round 22 – the top six and the bottom six. Clubs in these groups played each other twice again bringing the total fixture count to 32.

=== Matches 1–22 ===
Home \ Away	ABE	AFA	AIR	BAL	BAN	CMR	LLA	NEA	NEW	PTA	PRE	TNS
Aberystwyth Town		1–1	1–2	0–4	0–2	4–1	1–2	1–1	4–1	0–2	1–3	1–1
Afan Lido	0–0		0–0	0–1	0–0	1–0	0–0	1–0	3–2	1–2	0–1	3–1
Airbus UK Broughton	1–1	3–1		1–2	2–4	3–1	1–1	2–2	3–2	1–1	2–1	1–2
Bala Town	3–0	3–1	1–0		1–2	2–0	2–4	0–0	2–2	2–0	1–1	2–2
Bangor City	1–1	4–1	2–1	2–1		4–0	3–2	2–1	4–0	3–1	5–3	0–3
Carmarthen Town	2–1	2–5	3–1	0–1	1–2		0–3	2–2	0–1	2–0	2–1	0–1
Llanelli	2–0	4–1	1–1	3–1	2–1	2–0		0–1	9–2	2–0	3–2	0–1
Neath	4–2	1–1	3–0	4–0	2–0	1–0	2–0		5–0	3–2	3–1	1–1
Newtown	1–2	2–1	1–3	0–2	2–1	4–2	0–2	0–4		2–0	1–2	1–3
Port Talbot Town	0–4	2–2	2–1	2–2	1–2	2–0	0–1	1–2	3–1		0–0	2–1
Prestatyn Town	1–0	3–1	2–2	0–1	0–5	6–1	0–2	1–1	2–1	2–1		0–2
The New Saints	3–2	3–0	3–1	1–1	3–4	4–0	4–2	3–0	5–0	3–2	2–1	

Source: Welsh Premiership Football League^{[usurped]}
Legend: Blue = home team win; Yellow = draw; Red = away team win.

=== Matches 23–32 ===
Top six

Home \ Away	BAN	TNS	LLA	NEA	BAL	PRE
Bangor City		1–3	2–2	1–3	4–2	2–1
The New Saints	5–0		1–1	1–2	3–2	2–1
Llanelli	0–1	0–2		1–2	1–2	3–2
Neath	1–3	0–1	1–5		2–0	1–0
Bala Town	0–1	0–1	0–1	2–2		3–0
Prestatyn Town	0–4	0–4	1–2	2–3	1–2	

Source: rsssf.com
Legend: Blue = home team win; Yellow = draw; Red = away team win.

Bottom six

Home \ Away	AIR	PTA	AFA	ABE	NEW	CMR
Airbus UK Broughton		2–2	1–1	3–2	3–1	0–1
Port Talbot Town	2–1		1–2	2–1	1–1	0–1
Afan Lido	1–2	2–2		0–2	1–6	5–1
Aberystwyth Town	2–0	1–1	1–1		3–2	2–2
Newtown	0–4	2–2	1–1	1–1		2–1
Carmarthen Town	1–0	1–0	3–2	0–3	3–2	

Source: rsssf.com
Legend: Blue = home team win; Yellow = draw; Red = away team win.

== UEFA Europa League play-offs ==
Teams who finished in positions fourth through eighth at the end of the season participated in a play-off to determine the second participant for the 2012–13 UEFA Europa League. As Neath failed to win their appeal against an FAW Domestic licence, Aberystwyth Town took their place (See Relegation Section)

=== Quarter-finals ===
7 May 2012
14:00 BST

Airbus UK Broughton	0–1	Aberystwyth Town
	Report	Thomas 57'

The Airfield, Broughton
Attendance: 327
Referee: Lee Evans

=== Semi-finals ===
12 May 2012
14:00 BST

Llanelli	1–0 (a.e.t.)	Aberystwyth Town
Follows 108'	Report

Stebonheath Park, Llanelli
Attendance: 281
Referee: Bryn Markham-Jones

12 May 2012
14:30 BST

Bala Town	2–1	Prestatyn Town
Sheridan 4'; Hunt 47'	report	Hayes 30'

Maes Tegid, Bala
Attendance: 426
Referee: Dean John

=== Final ===
19 May 2012
15:15 BST

Llanelli	2–1	Bala Town
Griffiths 4'; Grist 19'	report	Hunt 76'

Stebonheath Park, Llanelli
Attendance: 318
Referee: Huw Jones

== Top goalscorers ==
Rank	Player	Club	Goals
1	(Wales) Rhys Griffiths	Llanelli AFC	22
2	(New Zealand) Greg Draper	The New Saints	21
3	(Wales) Les Davies	Bangor City	15
4	(England) Ian Sheridan	Airbus UK/Bala Town	14
4	(England) Lee Hunt	Bala Town	14
5	(Wales) Luke Bowen	Neath Athletic	13
