= 2006–07 Welsh Premier League =

Welsh Premier League
- Season: 2006–07
- Champions: The New Saints
- Relegated: Cwmbran Town
- Champions League: The New Saints
- UEFA Cup: Rhyl; Carmarthen Town
- Intertoto Cup: Llanelli
- Matches played: 272
- Goals scored: 835 (3.07 per match)
- Top goalscorer: Rhys Griffiths (30)
- Biggest home win: The New Saints 7–0 Airbus UK Broughton
- Biggest away win: Caersws 1–7 Carmarthen Town; Newtown 0–6 Rhyl
- Highest scoring: Cwmbran Town 4–5 Carmarthen Town; Welshpool Town 6–3 Airbus UK Broughton

The 2006–07 Welsh Premier League was the 15th season of the Welsh Premier League since its establishment as the League of Wales in 1992. It began on 18 August 2006 and ended on 21 April 2007. The league was won for the third consecutive season by The New Saints, their fourth title overall.

== League table ==
Pos	Team	Pld	W	D	L	GF	GA	GD	Pts	Qualification or relegation
1	The New Saints (C)	32	24	4	4	81	20	+61	76	Qualification for Champions League first qualifying round
2	Rhyl	32	20	9	3	67	35	+32	69	Qualification for UEFA Cup first qualifying round
3	Llanelli	32	18	9	5	72	33	+39	63	Qualification for Intertoto Cup first round
4	Welshpool Town	32	17	9	6	54	33	+21	60	
5	Connah's Quay Nomads	32	16	8	8	49	40	+9	56	
6	Port Talbot Town	32	15	6	11	42	39	+3	51	
7	Carmarthen Town	32	14	8	10	57	50	+7	50	Qualification for UEFA Cup first qualifying round (Note: As 2006–07 Welsh Cup winner)
8	Aberystwyth Town	32	13	9	10	47	37	+10	48	
9	Bangor City	32	14	6	12	55	47	+8	48	
10	Haverfordwest County	32	10	9	13	49	46	+3	39	
11	Porthmadog (Note: Porthmadog deducted 3 points)	32	8	11	13	40	52	−12	32	
12	Airbus UK	32	7	8	17	40	67	−27	29	
13	NEWI Cefn Druids	32	7	7	18	41	66	−25	28	
14	Caersws	32	6	9	17	34	59	−25	27	
15	Caernarfon Town	32	6	8	18	41	73	−32	26	
16	Newtown	32	6	6	20	30	63	−33	24	
17	Cwmbran Town (R)	32	4	8	20	36	75	−39	20	Relegation to Welsh Division One

Rules for classification: 1) points; 2) goal difference; 3) number of goals scored.
(C) Champions; (R) Relegated

== Results ==
Home \ Away	ABE	AIR	BAN	CAE	CWS	CMR	CDR	CQN	CWM	HAV	LLA	NTW	PTT	POR	RHY	TNS	WEL
Aberystwyth Town		1–1	0–2	2–0	1–0	4–2	3–0	1–1	3–1	2–2	1–1	4–2	0–2	0–1	2–3	0–0	0–0
Airbus UK	0–0		4–1	2–3	0–3	2–2	0–1	2–3	3–0	2–0	1–4	1–2	3–0	1–1	0–2	0–1	1–4
Bangor City	1–4	3–1		0–0	1–2	1–3	6–0	3–1	1–1	4–1	4–0	5–2	0–0	2–1	1–3	0–2	1–0
Caernarfon Town	1–3	0–2	0–1		2–2	3–5	1–1	0–2	0–1	1–4	2–6	1–0	1–2	2–2	2–6	1–3	2–0
Caersws	0–1	0–0	0–1	1–1		1–7	2–1	2–1	3–3	3–3	0–3	0–1	1–4	0–1	1–1	0–2	1–3
Carmarthen Town	1–0	2–1	2–2	4–1	2–0		4–0	1–3	1–0	1–3	0–2	2–0	1–0	1–1	1–1	0–0	2–4
NEWI Cefn Druids	1–2	3–1	0–3	3–2	2–2	1–2		2–2	3–0	2–2	0–1	1–1	0–3	3–0	2–3	2–3	1–3
Connah's Quay Nomads	1–0	1–2	3–0	2–2	4–3	4–1	1–0		2–2	5–3	0–1	2–1	2–1	1–0	0–2	0–0	1–3
Cwmbran Town	2–0	2–2	0–1	0–3	2–5	4–5	3–2	0–1		0–0	2–2	0–2	1–2	2–3	2–3	0–5	1–4
Haverfordwest County	1–1	5–1	2–0	2–1	1–0	0–1	0–1	0–0	2–0		1–1	3–2	1–2	1–1	0–1	0–3	0–1
Llanelli	1–3	4–0	3–0	4–2	0–0	1–1	3–1	1–1	5–1	3–2		3–2	0–0	5–0	6–0	1–2	2–3
Newtown	1–1	1–1	2–1	0–1	0–1	1–1	0–2	0–1	2–3	1–0	0–2		1–2	0–0	0–6	0–4	0–4
Port Talbot Town	1–3	0–2	0–5	7–1	0–0	1–0	1–1	0–1	2–0	1–4	1–0	2–1		1–2	3–2	2–1	0–0
Porthmadog	0–4	1–1	1–2	2–2	4–0	3–0	3–0	1–2	2–2	0–3	1–1	2–3	1–1		1–2	1–2	2–1
Rhyl	3–0	4–0	3–1	0–0	4–0	1–0	2–2	2–1	1–0	3–2	2–2	2–2	2–0	2–1		0–0	0–0
The New Saints	4–1	7–0	5–2	1–3	2–1	4–1	3–1	4–0	4–0	2–1	0–2	4–0	2–0	3–0	2–0		6–0
Welshpool Town	1–0	6–3	1–1	3–0	1–0	1–1	4–2	0–0	1–1	0–0	0–2	1–0	0–1	3–1	1–1	1–0	

Legend: Blue = home team win; Yellow = draw; Red = away team win.

== Top goalscorers ==
Goals	Player	Team
30	Rhys Griffiths	Llanelli
19	Jacob Mingorance	Llanelli
19	Marc Lloyd-Williams	Bangor City
17	John Toner	The New Saints
17	Jody Jenkins	Haverfordwest County
16	Lee Hunt	Rhyl
16	Calvin Davies	Welshpool Town
15	Kaid Mohamed	Carmarthen Town
13	Mike Heverin	NEWI Cefn Druids
13	Steve Rogers	Welshpool Town

Source: www.welsh-premier.com

== Monthly awards ==
Month	Manager of the Month		Player of the Month	
Month	Manager	Club	Player	Club
August	(Wales) Mark Jones	Carmarthen Town	(Wales) Marc Limbert	Connah's Quay Nomads
September	(Wales) Peter Nicholas	Llanelli	(Wales) Matthew Rees	Port Talbot Town
October	(Wales) John Hulse	Rhyl	(Wales) Rhys Griffiths	Llanelli
November	(Scotland) Brian Coyne	Aberystwyth Town	(Wales) Tommy Mutton	Connah's Quay Nomads
December	(England) Ken McKenna	The New Saints	(Canada) John Toner	The New Saints
January	(Wales) Tomi Morgan	Welshpool Town	(Germany) Lee Hudgell	Haverfordwest County
February	(England) Steve Bleasdale	Bangor City	(Wales) Gareth Owen	Airbus UK
March	(England) Ken McKenna	The New Saints	(Wales) Lee Kendall	Haverfordwest County
April	(Wales) Peter Nicholas	Llanelli	(Wales) Paul Addo	Caernarfon Town
