= Peter Nicholas (footballer) =

Welsh footballer (born 1959)

Personal information
- Date of birth: 10 November 1959 (age 67)
- Place of birth: Newport, Monmouthshire, Wales
- Height: 5 ft 8 in (1.73 m)
- Position: Defensive midfielder

Youth career
- Crystal Palace

Senior career*
Years	Team	Apps	(Gls)
1976–1981	Crystal Palace	127	(7)
1981–1983	Arsenal	60	(1)
1983–1985	Crystal Palace	47	(7)
1985–1987	Luton Town	102	(1)
1987–1988	Aberdeen	39	(3)
1988–1991	Chelsea	80	(2)
1991–1993	Watford	40	(1)
Total		495	(22)

International career
1979–1992	Wales	73	(2)

Managerial career
- 2000–2001: Barry Town
- 2002–2004: Newport County
- 2005–2009: Llanelli
- * Club domestic league appearances and goals

Peter Nicholas (born 10 November 1959) is a Welsh former professional football player and manager. He was capped 73 times at senior level for the Wales national team between 1979 and 1991.

== Career ==
=== Crystal Palace ===
Nicholas was born in Maesglas, Newport. He joined his first professional club, Crystal Palace, in 1976 as a youth player. He spent five seasons at Selhurst Park, and played over 150 matches for the club, picking up the Second Division title in 1978–79. In the meantime he had made his debut for Wales, and would go on to win 73 caps for his country, scoring two goals. Originally a centre half, he was later moved into midfield and became known as a tough-tackling and uncompromising defensive midfielder.

=== Arsenal ===
Crystal Palace could not sustain their place in the top flight and Nicholas was sold to Arsenal in March 1981 for £500,000, shortly before Palace's relegation back to the Second Division. At Arsenal, Nicholas went straight into the first team and didn't finish on a losing side for the rest of the 1980–81 season. He made 41 appearances the next season, and became captain of Wales as well. However, a series of injuries in the 1982–83 season meant his place in the Arsenal side became uncertain. In all, he played 80 matches for Arsenal, scoring three goals. His goals came in the league against Ipswich Town in April 1981 and he scored further goals in the League Cup; one against Norwich City in the 1981–82 season and one against Manchester United in the semi-final (first leg) of the 1982–83 League Cup. He is also remembered for going in goal in an FA Cup tie against rivals Tottenham Hotspur in January 1982 after Pat Jennings was injured.

=== Return to Crystal Palace ===
Looking for first team football, he returned to Palace on loan in August 1983 and at the end of that season the move was made permanent for £150,000. However, his second spell at Palace was not as successful, and he signed for Luton Town in 1985. He played over 100 games for the Hatters and his form noticeably improved.

=== Aberdeen ===
He was signed by Aberdeen for £350,000 in 1987. In 1987–88, he reached the Scottish League Cup final, against Rangers; the match finished 3–3 and Nicholas missed a penalty in the ensuing shootout, which meant Aberdeen went home empty-handed.

=== Later career ===
He later had spells with Chelsea (winning another Second Division winners' medal), and Watford before retiring in 1993.

After retirement, he became Chelsea's youth coach, before moving to Brentford and then returning to his old club Crystal Palace to take the same role there. He was later promoted to assistant manager at Palace, before being appointed manager of League of Wales side Barry Town, where he won the title in 2001. He was also manager of Newport County from 2002 until 2004 and led them to the 2003 FAW Premier Cup final. From August 2005 to April 2009 he was manager of Llanelli and won the Welsh Premier League title in 2008. He was replaced by Andy Legg in April 2009.

== Honours ==
=== Player ===
Crystal Palace Youth

- FA Youth Cup: 1978

Chelsea

- Football League Second Division: 1988–89
- Full Members' Cup: 1989–90

=== Manager ===
Llanelli

- Welsh Premier League: 2007–08
- Welsh League Cup: 2008

Individual

- League of Wales Manager of the Season: 2000–01, 2007–08
