= 2007–08 Welsh Premier League =

Welsh Premier League
- Season: 2007–08
- Champions: Llanelli
- Relegated: Llangefni Town
- Champions League: Llanelli
- UEFA Cup: Bangor City; The New Saints
- Intertoto Cup: Rhyl
- Matches: 306
- Goals: 982 (3.21 per match)
- Top goalscorer: Rhys Griffiths (40)
- Biggest home win: Llanelli 8–0 Port Talbot Town; Carmarthen Town 8-0 Connah's Quay Nomads
- Biggest away win: Connah's Quay Nomads 0-7 Bangor City
- Highest scoring: Caersws 2-7 Rhyl

The 2007–08 Welsh Premier League was the 16th season of the Welsh Premier League since its establishment in 1992 as the League of Wales. It began on 17 August 2007 and ended on 19 April 2008. The league was won by Llanelli, their first league title.

== League table ==
Pos	Team	Pld	W	D	L	GF	GA	GD	Pts	Qualification or relegation
1	Llanelli (C)	34	27	4	3	99	35	+64	85	Qualification for Champions League first qualifying round
2	The New Saints	34	25	3	6	85	30	+55	78	Qualification for UEFA Cup first qualifying round
3	Rhyl	34	21	6	7	60	24	+36	69	Qualification for Intertoto Cup first round
4	Port Talbot Town	34	17	8	9	57	48	+9	59	
5	Bangor City	34	15	10	9	62	31	+31	55	Qualification for UEFA Cup first qualifying round (Note: Via 2007–08 Welsh Cup)
6	Carmarthen Town	34	15	9	10	59	47	+12	54	
7	Neath Athletic	34	15	9	10	57	52	+5	54	
8	Haverfordwest County	34	14	5	15	61	59	+2	47	
9	Aberystwyth Town	34	13	7	14	57	45	+12	46	
10	Welshpool Town	34	12	10	12	49	52	−3	46	
11	Airbus UK Broughton	34	11	9	14	36	44	−8	42	
12	Cefn Druids	34	12	2	20	45	66	−21	38	
13	Newtown	34	9	10	15	47	66	−19	37	
14	Caernarfon Town	34	10	6	18	42	74	−32	36	
15	Connah's Quay Nomads	34	9	7	18	42	85	−43	34	
16	CPD Porthmadog	34	7	6	21	48	70	−22	27	
17	Caersws	34	6	8	20	37	72	−35	26	Spared from relegation (Note: Caersws FC not relegated due to Welsh Football League First Division champions Goytre United refusing promotion.)
18	Llangefni Town (R)	34	7	3	24	39	82	−43	24	Relegation to Cymru Alliance

Rules for classification: 1) points; 2) goal difference; 3) number of goals scored.
(C) Champions; (R) Relegated

== Results ==
Home \ Away	ABE	AIR	BAN	CNR	CAE	CMR	CQN	POR	HAV	LLA	LLG	NEA	CDR	NEW	PTA	RHL	TNS	WEL
Aberystwyth Town		0–0	2–1	4–0	2–1	0–2	6–1	2–1	2–3	1–2	3–0	1–2	1–0	2–2	2–4	0–0	5–1	2–3
Airbus UK Broughton	1–1		1–0	1–2	0–2	0–1	0–0	2–0	3–1	0–1	1–3	2–1	3–2	1–1	1–0	0–2	2–0	1–1
Bangor City	1–0	5–0		5–1	1–1	1–1	3–2	2–0	2–0	1–1	2–2	1–1	5–1	2–2	0–0	1–2	1–2	1–0
Caernarfon Town	1–0	0–3	0–4		2–0	2–1	1–1	2–4	1–2	3–4	1–0	1–2	1–1	0–0	3–1	0–1	1–7	1–1
Caersws FC	1–1	2–3	1–0	0–1		1–2	3–4	2–4	1–2	0–5	1–1	2–2	1–2	1–0	1–4	2–7	1–2	0–3
Carmarthen Town	0–3	2–1	2–1	1–1	1–3		8–0	0–0	2–1	1–2	2–2	1–1	4–1	2–1	0–0	0–0	0–3	5–2
Connah's Quay Nomads	1–2	1–0	0–7	1–0	1–0	4–3		1–2	1–1	0–1	2–0	2–0	2–1	1–1	0–1	0–5	1–3	3–3
CPD Porthmadog	2–6	2–2	0–0	1–3	0–1	1–2	3–3		0–2	2–4	2–4	0–2	1–2	2–3	1–2	1–0	0–1	1–1
Haverfordwest County	3–1	4–0	0–1	1–1	1–0	2–2	6–2	3–2		1–4	5–1	1–2	3–0	2–3	2–1	1–1	0–4	1–0
Llanelli	1–0	1–0	0–2	5–1	1–1	4–1	4–0	1–2	4–2		5–0	3–3	1–0	5–0	8–0	2–1	4–0	3–0
Llangefni Town AFC	3–0	0–3	0–1	1–2	0–1	0–3	1–2	1–4	2–1	1–5		4–2	2–0	2–3	4–1	0–3	0–3	0–1
Neath Athletic	2–2	2–1	1–0	3–2	2–2	1–2	4–0	2–1	2–1	0–2	2–0		3–0	2–0	0–2	1–1	2–2	2–5
Cefn Druids	0–2	4–1	1–6	5–1	4–0	3–1	5–2	1–1	1–0	2–5	2–1	0–2		3–0	0–1	1–4	1–0	0–2
Newtown	1–2	1–1	2–2	3–1	2–2	0–1	4–1	4–2	1–4	3–5	2–1	3–0	1–0		0–0	0–2	0–0	1–2
Port Talbot Town	2–1	0–0	0–0	2–1	3–1	2–0	2–1	4–2	2–2	0–1	3–1	3–3	5–1	5–1		1–2	1–0	1–1
Rhyl	0–0	2–1	1–2	3–1	2–1	2–1	1–0	1–0	2–0	1–2	4–1	1–0	1–0	2–1	5–0		0–1	1–1
The New Saints	1–0	0–0	2–1	4–0	6–0	0–3	3–1	4–1	6–2	3–0	7–1	3–1	3–0	6–0	2–1	1–0		2–0
Welshpool Town	2–1	0–1	2–0	2–4	1–1	2–2	1–1	0–3	2–1	3–3	3–0	1–2	0–1	2–1	1–3	1–0	0–3	

Legend: Blue = home team win; Yellow = draw; Red = away team win.

== Top scorers ==
Rank	Scorer	Club	Goals
1	(Wales) Rhys Griffiths	Llanelli	40
2	(Wales) Marc Lloyd-Williams	Rhyl & Newtown	23
3	(England) Martin Rose	Port Talbot Town	19
3	(England) Ashley Stott	Rhyl	19
5	(Wales) Danny Thomas	Carmarthen Town	18

== Monthly awards ==
Month	Manager of the Month		Player of the Month	
Month	Manager	Club	Player	Club
September	(Wales) Peter Nicholas	Llanelli	(England) Andy Moran	Rhyl
October	(Wales) Deryn Brace	Carmarthen Town	(Wales) Chris Venables	Welshpool Town
November	(England) Neville Powell	Bangor City	(Wales) Luke Sherbon	Aberystwyth Town
December	(England) Ken McKenna	The New Saints	(England) Wes Kilgannon	Connah's Quay Nomads
January	(Wales) John Hulse	Rhyl	(Wales) Rhys Griffiths	Llanelli
February	(Wales) Peter Nicholas	Llanelli	(Wales) Ross Stephens	Welshpool Town
March	(Wales) Peter Nicholas	Llanelli	(Wales) Darren Thomas	Llangefni Town
