= 1992–93 Cymru Alliance =

Cymru Alliance
- Season: 1992–93
- Champions: Llansantffraid

The 1992–93 Cymru Alliance was the third season of the Cymru Alliance after its establishment in 1990. The league was won by Llansantffraid.

== League table ==
Pos	Team	Pld	W	D	L	GF	GA	GD	Pts	Promotion
1	Llansantffraid (C, P)	28	23	3	2	89	34	+55	72	Promotion to League of Wales
2	Welshpool Town	28	21	2	5	92	34	+58	65	
3	Rhyl	28	20	4	4	74	22	+52	64	
4	Wrexham Reserves	28	19	4	5	81	34	+47	61	
5	Lex XI	28	14	8	6	60	42	+18	50	
6	Carno	28	9	11	8	44	56	−12	38	
7	Cefn Druids	28	10	5	13	46	41	+5	35	
8	Penrhyncoch	28	10	5	13	56	71	−15	35	
9	Ruthin Town	28	9	7	12	43	58	−15	34	
10	Rhos Aelwyd	28	7	6	15	37	67	−30	27	
11	Knighton Town	28	7	6	15	48	82	−34	27	
12	Mostyn Town	28	7	3	18	35	64	−29	24	
13	Rhayader Town	28	6	5	17	32	66	−34	23	
14	Gresford Athletic	28	6	1	21	36	116	−80	19	
15	Brymbo	28	3	8	17	40	66	−26	17	

Source: Cymru Alliance
Rules for classification: 1) points; 2) goal difference; 3) number of goals scored.
(C) Champions; (P) Promoted
