= Ken McKenna =

English footballer and manager (born 1960)

Personal information
- Full name: Kenneth McKenna
- Date of birth: 2 July 1960 (age 66)
- Place of birth: Birkenhead, England
- Position: Forward

Senior career*
Years	Team	Apps	(Gls)
1982–1983	Tranmere Rovers	4	(0)
1983–?	Telford United		
?–1987	Runcorn		
1987–1989	Tranmere Rovers	16	(3)
1989–1990	Telford United		
1990–1992	Altrincham	74	(41)
1992–1994	Barrow		
1994–1997	Conwy United	98	(89)
1997–1998	Bangor City	27	(18)
1998–2005	The New Saints	63	(20)

Managerial career
- 2001–2008: The New Saints
- 2008: Cammell Laird
- 2010–2011: Altrincham
- * Club domestic league appearances and goals

Kenneth McKenna (born 2 July 1960) is an English former professional footballer and manager who last worked as assistant manager of National League side AFC Fylde.

== Playing career ==
McKenna started his senior playing career with Poulton Victoria and then signed for Tranmere Rovers in the Football League on a non-contract basis, making four league appearances. He left the club in 1983, joining Telford United and later won a Cheshire Senior Cup winner's medal with Runcorn, returning to Tranmere Rovers for a second spell in 1987.

After a second spell at Telford United, McKenna joined Altrincham at the start of the 1990–91 season, scoring 33 goals in 56 appearances in all competitions, finishing the season with the Robins' Player of the Year award and was part of a side that went 28 games without defeat and scored in 10 consecutive games. He also managed hat tricks against Merthyr Tydfil, Boston United and Cheltenham Town. He continued to score goals during his second season with the club, finishing the year with 23 goals in all competitions, despite the Moss Lane outfit barely surviving the drop before leaving to join Barrow in 1992.

In 1994, McKenna joined Welsh Premier League side Conwy United, setting a new club scoring record in the 1995–96 season with 38 goals in 35 league appearances, finishing as the league's top scorer. After one year with Bangor City, during which he scoring a late equaliser in the Welsh Cup final against Connah's Quay Nomads to take the game to penalties which Bangor later won, he joined Total Network Solutions and was later appointed manager during the 2000–01 season.

== Managerial career ==
McKenna steered TNS to three runners-up spots in the Welsh Premier League before winning three successive titles in 2004–05, 2005–06 and 2006–07, as well as adding FAW Premier Cup, Welsh Cup and Welsh League Cup successes. In March 2008, he left the club by mutual consent.

McKenna returned to his home town of Birkenhead to become manager of Cammell Laird but left the club soon after, later becoming chief scout at Cambridge United before joining Altrincham as assistant manager. In September 2010, he was appointed caretaker-manager at the club following the sacking of Graham Heathcote. Following an improvement in the team's results under McKenna, he was later handed the job on a permanent basis.

On 16 May 2011, it was announced that McKenna would take a new role as assistant manager, to the new Morecambe manager, Jim Bentley. In 2019, he followed Bentley to new club AFC Fylde, again taking the role of assistant manager. He left the position in July 2020.

== Honours ==
=== Player ===
Telford United

- FA Trophy winner: 1989

Bangor City

- Welsh Cup winner: 1998

Individual

- League of Wales Golden Boot winner: 1995–96

=== Manager ===
The New Saints

- Welsh Premier League winner: 2004–05, 2005–06, 2006–07
- Welsh Cup winner: 2005
- Welsh League Cup winner: 2006
- FAW Premier Cup winner: 2007

Individual

- Welsh Premier League Manager of the Season: 2004–05, 2005–06, 2006–07
