= 2005–06 Welsh Premier League =

Annual soccer tournament

Welsh Premier League
- Season: 2005–06
- Champions: Total Network Solutions
- Relegated: Cardiff Grange Quins
- Champions League: Total Network Solutions
- UEFA Cup: Llanelli; Rhyl
- Intertoto Cup: Carmarthen Town
- Matches played: 306
- Goals scored: 911 (2.98 per match)
- Top goalscorer: Rhys Griffiths (28)

The 2005–06 Welsh Premier League was the 14th season of the Welsh Premier League since its establishment as the League of Wales in 1992. It began on 27 August 2005 and ended on 22 April 2006. The league was won for the second consecutive season by Total Network Solutions, their third title overall.

== League table ==
Pos	Team	Pld	W	D	L	GF	GA	GD	Pts	Qualification or relegation
1	Total Network Solutions (C)	34	27	5	2	87	17	+70	86	Qualification for Champions League first qualifying round
2	Llanelli	34	21	5	8	64	28	+36	68	Qualification for UEFA Cup first qualifying round
3	Rhyl	34	18	10	6	65	30	+35	64	Qualification for UEFA Cup first qualifying round
4	Carmarthen Town	34	17	6	11	62	42	+20	57	Qualification for Intertoto Cup first round
5	Port Talbot Town	34	15	11	8	47	30	+17	56	
6	Welshpool Town	34	15	9	10	59	48	+11	54	
7	Aberystwyth Town	34	14	10	10	59	48	+11	52	
8	Haverfordwest County	34	12	14	8	49	36	+13	50	
9	Bangor City	34	14	3	17	51	54	−3	45	
10	Caersws	34	11	12	11	44	56	−12	45	
11	Porthmadog	34	12	8	14	57	59	−2	44	
12	Connah's Quay Nomads	34	10	8	16	36	46	−10	38	
13	Caernarfon Town	34	9	10	15	47	55	−8	37	
14	NEWI Cefn Druids	34	7	11	16	42	58	−16	32	
15	Airbus UK	34	8	8	18	35	60	−25	32	
16	Newtown (Note: Newtown deducted five points for fielding ineligible player.)	34	10	6	18	42	61	−19	31	
17	Cwmbran Town (Note: Cwmbran Town deducted 13 points for fielding two ineligible players.)	34	8	8	18	42	73	−31	19	
18	Cardiff Grange Quins (Note: Cardiff Grange Quins deducted one point.) (R)	34	4	4	26	23	110	−87	15	Relegation to Welsh Division One

Rules for classification: 1) points; 2) goal difference; 3) number of goals scored.
(C) Champions; (R) Relegated

== Results ==
Home \ Away	ABE	AIR	BAN	CAE	CWS	GRA	CMR	CDR	CQN	CWM	HAV	LLA	NTW	PTT	POR	RHY	TNS	WEL
Aberystwyth Town		2–2	1–0	1–1	0–0	0–0	1–1	2–1	1–2	3–1	1–1	4–1	3–1	0–3	4–1	1–2	2–0	6–2
Airbus UK	0–1		2–1	1–2	1–1	3–0	1–3	3–2	2–2	1–3	1–2	1–0	0–2	0–1	0–1	1–2	0–5	0–2
Bangor City	3–1	1–2		1–0	1–2	5–1	1–2	2–1	0–2	3–0	0–1	1–3	0–1	3–2	1–2	0–3	2–3	2–4
Caernarfon Town	4–2	0–1	1–1		6–0	2–1	0–2	1–1	4–2	2–2	0–2	0–3	0–0	0–1	1–2	0–2	1–3	1–1
Caersws	1–1	3–1	0–6	3–4		2–2	1–2	1–0	1–0	1–2	1–0	1–4	2–1	1–1	2–1	1–1	0–2	0–2
Cardiff Grange Quins	2–5	0–1	2–3	4–1	0–5		0–6	3–1	1–4	1–1	1–0	0–5	0–1	0–5	0–2	0–2	0–3	0–5
Carmarthen Town	1–0	2–1	0–2	1–1	1–3	8–0		3–0	1–1	1–1	2–3	0–1	6–0	1–1	3–1	1–1	2–1	2–0
NEWI Cefn Druids	2–2	0–0	2–2	3–2	2–0	7–0	1–2		2–2	0–0	0–1	2–5	3–0	0–0	1–1	1–1	0–6	1–0
Connah's Quay Nomads	1–0	3–0	0–1	2–1	1–3	1–0	0–1	1–0		2–2	1–1	1–0	0–2	0–1	0–2	0–1	0–2	2–0
Cwmbran Town	1–3	1–1	1–2	0–1	2–2	1–1	3–2	1–2	2–1		3–2	0–1	0–1	2–5	3–1	1–7	1–4	1–2
Haverfordwest County	1–1	1–1	1–1	2–2	0–0	7–0	1–2	0–0	2–0	3–0		0–2	1–1	1–3	1–1	2–2	0–1	2–1
Llanelli	2–1	3–0	5–0	3–1	5–0	1–0	0–2	1–0	2–0	0–1	0–1		2–2	3–1	2–2	1–1	0–2	0–0
Newtown	1–3	0–3	0–1	1–2	0–2	5–0	2–1	2–3	1–1	4–1	2–3	0–3		0–1	3–1	1–4	0–3	1–1
Port Talbot Town	0–0	4–0	0–2	1–1	0–0	0–1	3–0	1–0	0–0	2–1	1–1	0–1	3–2		2–1	1–0	1–1	1–1
Porthmadog	0–2	3–1	1–2	2–3	3–3	4–0	3–0	5–0	2–2	5–1	1–4	1–2	1–1	1–1		2–1	2–2	2–0
Rhyl	4–1	1–1	4–1	2–1	0–0	5–2	1–0	1–1	2–1	1–2	1–1	0–1	3–1	3–0	3–0		0–0	3–0
Total Network Solutions	5–0	3–0	2–0	2–1	2–0	7–0	4–1	4–1	2–0	1–0	2–0	0–0	3–1	1–0	7–0	1–0		1–1
Welshpool Town	1–4	3–3	2–0	0–0	2–2	2–1	3–0	3–2	4–1	5–1	1–1	3–2	1–2	2–1	1–0	3–1	1–2	

Legend: Blue = home team win; Yellow = draw; Red = away team win.
