= The New Saints F.C. =

Association football club

The New Saints
- Full name: The New Saints of Oswestry Town & Llansantffraid Football Club
- Nicknames: The Saints, TNS
- Short name: TNS
- Founded: 1959; 67 years ago
- Ground: Park Hall; Oswestry, Shropshire, England
- Capacity: 3,000 (3,000 seated)
- Chairman: Mike Harris
- Head coach: Craig Harrison
- League: Cymru Premier
- 2025–26: Cymru Premier, 1st of 12
- Website: tnsfc.co.uk
Home colours	Away colours	Third colours

The New Saints of Oswestry Town & Llansantffraid Football Club, commonly known as The New Saints (Welsh: Clwb Pêl-droed y Seintiau Newydd) or TNS FC are a professional football club that play in the Cymru Premier, part of the Welsh football system, but are based completely within England, in Oswestry, Shropshire.

They are the most successful club in the Welsh league structure, with 18 league titles to their name. Since the 2001–02 season, they have finished as champions or runners-up in every season, apart from 2008–09, when they finished third in the league. They became the first side playing in the Welsh league system to qualify for the group or league stage of any European competition after reaching the league phase of the UEFA Conference League for the first time in the 2024–25 season.

== History ==
=== Llansantffraid F.C. ===
The club was formed as Llansantffraid F.C. to represent the border village of Llansantffraid-ym-Mechain in 1959, and played at the Recreation Ground.

They first played competitive football in the Montgomeryshire Amateur Football League, and went on to win the championship seven times. At the end of the 1989–90 season they applied for entry into the Central Wales League and joined the league for the new season. In pre-season they played against Welshpool Town (founder members of the new Cymru Alliance) in the "Powysland Cup", fielding six former Welshpool players. Welshpool won the match 4–2 on penalties. Their stay in the Central Wales League was brief, winning promotion to the Cymru Alliance as runners-up on their first attempt. Llansantffraid's progress continued and in 1992–93 they gained promotion to the League of Wales as champions and won the Welsh Intermediate Cup with a 3–0 win against Brecon Corinthians.

=== Total Network Solutions ===
In the 1995–96 season, Llansantffraid won the Welsh Cup and qualified for the first time for the European Cup Winners' Cup. In their first European tie they met Polish Cup winners Ruch Chorzów and earned a 1–1 draw at home before losing 5–0 in Poland. In 1997, a local computer company, Total Network Solutions of Oswestry, arranged a £250,000 sponsorship deal which involved incorporating the company name into the club name as Total Network Solutions Llansantffraid. The club qualified for European competitions several times, with their European home games were generally played at either Newtown's or Wrexham's stadium, as the Recreation Ground was far below UEFA's standards (though for their 2003 meeting with Manchester City, they played their home game at the 72,000-seat Millennium Stadium in Cardiff). To comply with UEFA's regulations on third-party sponsorship, the club were known by their initialism TNS by the European governing body in their competitions.

The club's name was changed to Total Network Solutions F.C., being the first instance in the United Kingdom of a football club renaming itself after its sponsor's name only. Following the financial difficulties of Barry Town in the summer of 2003, TNS became the only club in the Welsh league system that had a full-time playing staff.

=== Merger with Oswestry Town ===
In 2003 a merger was proposed with Oswestry Town, a financially weaker club and close neighbour to TNS, who also played in the League of Wales despite being based across the border in Shropshire. In June the Football Association of Wales approved and ratified the merger on 14 August 2003 as did UEFA eventually, despite its initial objection to a merger of two clubs with different governing bodies.

The 2003–04 season was trophyless for TNS as they finished runners-up in the League of Wales to Rhyl and were beaten finalists in the Welsh Cup, also to Rhyl.

Due to problems relating to company and accounting law, despite playing as a merged team, the final merger was not approved by Oswestry's shareholders until December 2004.

The 2004–05 season proved much more successful, as TNS won a League and Cup double.

During the 2005–06 off-season, after newly crowned Champions League winners Liverpool were initially denied a place in the next season's competition, TNS offered to play a one-legged tie against the Reds for TNS's place in the first qualifying round. After UEFA reached a compromise by which Liverpool were placed in the first qualifying round of the competition, TNS and Liverpool ended up drawn against one another anyway. Liverpool won the first leg at Anfield 3–0 thanks to a Steven Gerrard hat-trick. In the second leg, played at Wrexham, Gerrard scored two goals after coming on as a substitute, adding to Djibril Cissé's opening goal for another 3–0 Liverpool victory. Although defeated, TNS drew praise, most notably for the young Northern Irish goalkeeper Gerard Doherty, of whom Rafael Benítez said: "The goalkeeper saved a lot of goals and for me he was the best player in the two games".

=== The New Saints F.C. ===
In early 2006 the club's sponsor, Total Network Solutions, was taken over by British Telecom, as a result of which the sponsorship arrangement lapsed at the end of the 2005–06 season, and it became necessary to find a new name for the club. After a trawl for new naming ideas, including an attempt to sell the naming rights on eBay, the name "The New Saints" was agreed upon as appropriate to the history of both of the originally merged clubs: Llansantffraid was always known as "The Saints"; Oswestry had strong connections with Saint Oswald, while the club's name was already abbreviated to TNS. A new club badge was also developed at the same time, featuring a dragon to represent Llansantffraid and a lion representing Oswestry.

On 10 February 2010, the BBC reported that the New Saints had applied to play home games at Chester City's Deva Stadium in 2010–11, after having been turned down for a grant to help fund the construction of a new 1,000-seat stand at Park Hall. At the time, the mooted move was complicated by Chester City's governance issues. Deva Stadium's pitch and stands lie in Wales, but outbuildings on the site that housed the club offices are in England, and Chester City were under the jurisdiction of the English Football Association. Chester City were liquidated a month later by HMRC; in any event, the New Saints were granted a domestic licence by the FAW in April 2010 and remained at Park Hall for 2010–11 season. The New Saints were crowned 2009–10 Welsh Premier League Champions.

The New Saints entered the Champions League in 2010–11. They were drawn against League of Ireland Premier Division Champions Bohemians in the Second Qualifying Round. They lost the first leg 1–0 at Dalymount Park in Dublin on 13 July 2010. However, they won the second leg at Park Hall 4–0 and won the tie 4–1 on aggregate, the first ever tie won by the club since their European debut in 1996. Bohemians manager Pat Fenlon later labelled his team's performance as "disgraceful" and said that "the players let the club, league and country down". The result was labelled by others as the worst result in Bohemians' 40-year European history. The Saints advanced to play Belgian Pro League Champions and European giants Anderlecht. The Saints were beaten 3–1 in the home leg played in Wrexham and 3–0 in the away game at the Constant Vanden Stock Stadium in Brussels. They then played CSKA Sofia in the Europa League playoff round, but were beaten 5–2 on aggregate. As league runners up during the 2010–11 season, they entered the Europa League qualifying rounds in 2011. They beat Belfast club Cliftonville 2–1 on aggregate in the first round, but were eliminated by Danish club FC Midtjylland 8–3 on aggregate in the following round. The season saw the club claim another domestic league and cup double.

The 2013–14 season saw the club win their eighth top flight tile, surpassing the record they then shared with Barry Town United, and becoming the most successful club in the Welsh domestic league system. On 30 December 2016, The New Saints defeated Cefn Druids 2–0 in the Cymru Premier. This extended their winning run to 27 matches, surpassing the previous record of 26 set by Ajax in the 1970s for the most consecutive club victories by a top-flight team in Europe.

The club qualified to the 2024–25 UEFA Conference League following a 3–0 win on aggregate over Panevėžys in the playoffs on 29 August 2024, becoming the first club from the Welsh league system to qualify for the group stage of a major UEFA competition. They were forced to play their home matches at Shrewsbury Town's New Meadow stadium due to Park Hall not meeting UEFA's regulations for hosting non-qualification matches. Facing Fiorentina in their first European group stage match on 3 October they were defeated 2–0. On 24 October, they became the first domestic Welsh club to win in the group stage of a major European competition, courtesy of a 2–0 victory over FC Astana at New Meadow.

At the end of the 2025–26 season, the club were again crowned league champions, their 14th title in seventeen seasons.

== The New Saints Football Club Foundation ==
Mike Harris formed The New Saints Football Club Foundation in 2013 to help those in the local community around the town of Oswestry. Following the model of many football community trusts, The New Saints Foundation benefits the local community by running numerous initiatives to promote health, wellbeing and inclusion, including free universal access summer camps which include free meals for the young people in the area.

The main aim of the TNSFC Foundation is to make physical activity accessible to boost health and social inclusion, while also protecting children and young people from risk of harm. All children and young people can benefit from the Foundation, and sessions include rural youth clubs, fun football skills sessions for 4 to 15 year olds, and provision for disabled children and those with special educational needs.

TNSFC Foundation works with various partners and funders to lead and facilitate a diverse range of activities which will promote health, wellbeing and opportunity for the community it serves. The running costs of the Foundation are funded by investments from Harris, while activities and events are funded by fundraising activity and paid-for classes.

Currently, the Foundation works with 15 schools in the local area, providing PE lessons and multi-sport after school clubs during term time, as well as around 4,000 places and free meals annually for school holiday activities.

After school clubs are typically costed – however, TNSFC Foundation aims to make them as affordable as possible in comparison to other provision in the local area. This also allows the Foundation to work with disengaged young people, who may be at risk of crime, anti-social behaviour or face exclusion from school. The Foundation recently secured funding for a 12-month programme to work and support these children following a successful pilot project.

As well as supporting the local youth, TNSFC Foundation has also offered free meals to the older community in the local area and provides opportunities for older members of the community to get active e.g. through walking football and local walking initiatives.

== Futsal ==
The club's futsal side has also seen success, having been winners of the inaugural FAW Futsal Cup in 2011 and reaching the final in 2012.

== Current squad ==
As of 19 September 2026

Note: Flags indicate national team as defined under FIFA eligibility rules; some limited exceptions apply. Players may hold more than one non-FIFA nationality.

No.	Pos.	Nation	Player
1	GK	WAL	Nathan Shepperd
4	MF	ENG	Dominic Corness
6	DF	WAL	Jack Bodenham
8	MF	NIR	Ryan Brobbel
9	FW	ENG	Brad Young
10	MF	ENG	Daniel Redmond (captain)
11	MF	KEN	Adam Wilson
12	DF	ENG	Harvey Godsmark-Ford
14	MF	WAL	Dan Williams
15	MF	IRL	Eoin Farrell
16	DF	ENG	Dynel Simeu
17	MF	ENG	Jordan Williams

No.	Pos.	Nation	Player
18	MF	NIR	Rory Holden
19	MF	WAL	Ben Clark
20	MF	WAL	Rhys Hughes
21	MF	WAL	Leo Smith
22	DF	WAL	Danny Davies
23	DF	IRL	Zach Nolan
28	FW	NIR	Ben Wilson
30	GK	ENG	Jack Edwards
34	MF	WAL	Josh Lock
37	FW	WAL	Isaac Jefferies
42	DF	ENG	Rui Clarke-Phillips

=== Out on loan ===
Note: Flags indicate national team as defined under FIFA eligibility rules; some limited exceptions apply. Players may hold more than one non-FIFA nationality.

No.	Pos.	Nation	Player
2	MF	WAL	Jacob Owen (at Haverfordwest County until 31 May 2027)
3	DF	ENG	Isaac Godwin (at Bangor City 1876 until 31 May 2027)
26	MF	ENG	Louis Phillips (at Trefelin until 31 May 2027)
31	DF	ENG	Ben Woollam (at Flint Town United until 31 May 2027)
35	MF	ENG	Brodie Summers (at Gornal Athletic until January 2027)

No.	Pos.	Nation	Player
36	MF	ENG	Jake Morris (at Caersws until 31 May 2027)
38	GK	WAL	Bryn Owen (at Buckley Town until 31 May 2027)
41	MF	WAL	Lewis Wynne (at Brickfield Rangers until 31 May 2027)
—	FW	ENG	Caleb Afful (at Buckley Town until 31 May 2027)

== Under 18's - Current squad ==
As of 21 August 2026

- The following team members have played for (bold), or been called up to the first team in a competitive game.

Note: Flags indicate national team as defined under FIFA eligibility rules; some limited exceptions apply. Players may hold more than one non-FIFA nationality.

No. / Pos. / Nation / Player; 40 / DF / ENG / Ellis McCue	No. / Pos. / Nation / Player; 44 / GK / WAL / George Jenkins

== League history ==
Season	League	Final position
1959–60 (Note: As Llansantffraid F.C.)	Montgomeryshire Amateur Football League	3rd
1960–61	Montgomeryshire Amateur Football League	9th
1961–62	Montgomeryshire Amateur Football League	6th
1962–63	Montgomeryshire Amateur Football League	Runners-Up (Note: After the cancellation of the season due to the winter of 1962–63, a cup style competition was played where Llansantffraid finished runners-up)
1963–64	Montgomeryshire Amateur Football League	7th
1964–65	Montgomeryshire Amateur Football League	3rd
1965–66	Montgomeryshire Amateur Football League	4th
1966–67	Montgomeryshire Amateur Football League	5th
1967–68	Montgomeryshire Amateur Football League	unknown
1968–69	Montgomeryshire Amateur Football League	1st – Champions (1st title)
1969–70	Montgomeryshire Amateur Football League. Division 1	1st – Champions (2nd title)
1970–71	Montgomeryshire Amateur Football League, Division 2	1st – Champions (promoted)
1971–72	Montgomeryshire Amateur Football League, Division 1	2nd – Runners-Up
1972–73	Montgomeryshire Amateur Football League, Division 1	2nd – Runners-Up
1973–74	Montgomeryshire Amateur Football League, Division 1	2nd – Runners-Up
1974–75	Montgomeryshire Amateur Football League, Division 1	2nd – Runners-Up
1975–76	Montgomeryshire Amateur Football League, Division 1	7th
1976–77	Montgomeryshire Amateur Football League, Division 1	6th
1977–78	Montgomeryshire Amateur Football League, Division 1	9th
1978–79	Montgomeryshire Amateur Football League, Division 1	11th (relegated)
1979–80	Montgomeryshire Amateur Football League, Division 2	5th
1980–81	Montgomeryshire Amateur Football League, Division 2	1st (promoted)
1981–82	Montgomeryshire Amateur Football League, Division 1	5th
1982–83	Montgomeryshire Amateur Football League, Division 1	1st – Champions (3rd title)
1983–84	Montgomeryshire Amateur Football League, Division 1	3rd
1984–85	Montgomeryshire Amateur Football League, Division 1	10th
1985–86	Montgomeryshire Amateur Football League, Division 1	6th
1986–87	Montgomeryshire Amateur Football League, Division 1	1st – Champions (4th title)
1987–88	Montgomeryshire Amateur Football League, Division 1	5th
1988–89	Montgomeryshire Amateur Football League, Division 1	5th
1989–90	Montgomeryshire Amateur Football League, Division 1	8th (Note: Llansantffraid elected to the Central Wales League at the end of the season)
1990–91	Central Wales League	2nd – Runners-Up (promoted)
1991–92	Cymru Alliance	2nd – Runners-Up (Note: Llansantffraid Reserves were also Champions of Montgomeryshire Amateur Football League, Division 1 (5th title))
1992–93	Cymru Alliance	1st – Champions (1st title) (Note: Llansantffraid Reserves were also Champions of Montgomeryshire Amateur Football League, Division 1 (6th title))
1993–94	League of Wales	18th
1994–95	League of Wales	9th
1995–96	League of Wales	12th
1996–97 (Note: As Total Network Solutions Llansantffraid F.C)	League of Wales	6th
1997–98 (Note: As Total Network Solutions F.C.)	League of Wales	14th
1998–99	League of Wales	8th
1999–2000	League of Wales	1st – Champions (1st title)
2000–01	League of Wales	8th
2001–02	League of Wales	2nd – Runners-Up
2002–03	Welsh Premier League	2nd – Runners-Up
2003–04	Welsh Premier League	2nd – Runners-Up
2004–05	Welsh Premier League	1st – Champions (2nd title)
2005–06	Welsh Premier League	1st – Champions (3rd title)
2006–07 (Note: As The New Saints F.C)	Welsh Premier League	1st – Champions (4th title)
2007–08	Welsh Premier League	2nd – Runners-Up
2008–09	Welsh Premier League	3rd
2009–10	Welsh Premier League	1st – Champions (5th title)
2010–11	Welsh Premier League	2nd – Runners-Up
2011–12	Welsh Premier League	1st – Champions (6th title)
2012–13	Welsh Premier League	1st – Champions (7th title)
2013–14	Welsh Premier League	1st – Champions (8th title)
2014–15	Welsh Premier League	1st – Champions (9th title)
2015–16	Welsh Premier League	1st – Champions (10th title)
2016–17	Welsh Premier League	1st – Champions (11th title)
2017–18	Welsh Premier League	1st – Champions (12th title)
2018–19	Welsh Premier League	1st – Champions (13th title)
2019–20	Cymru Premier	2nd – Runners-Up
2020–21	Cymru Premier	2nd – Runners-Up
2021–22	Cymru Premier	1st – Champions (14th title)
2022–23	Cymru Premier	1st – Champions (15th title)
2023–24	Cymru Premier	1st – Champions (16th title)
2024–25	Cymru Premier	1st – Champions (17th title)
2025–26	Cymru Premier	1st – Champions (18th title)
2026–27	Cymru Premier	

== History in European competition ==
As of 14 December 2024

=== Overall ===
Competition	Pld	W	D	L	GF	GA	GD
UEFA Champions League	41	11	5	25	41	68	−27
UEFA Cup & UEFA Europa League	26	3	4	19	21	68	−47
UEFA Conference League	10	5	3	2	20	9	+11
UEFA Cup Winners' Cup	2	0	1	1	1	6	−5
Total	79	19	13	47	83	151	–68

=== Matches ===
Season	Competition	Round	Club	1st Leg	2nd Leg	Agg.
1996–97	UEFA Cup Winners' Cup	QR	(Poland) Ruch Chorzów	1–1 (H) (Note: Match played at the Racecourse Ground, Wrexham)	0–5 (A)	1–6
2000–01	UEFA Champions League	1Q	(Estonia) FC Levadia Tallinn	2–2 (H)	0–4 (A)	2–6
2001–02	UEFA Cup	QR	(Poland) Polonia Warsaw	0–4 (A)	0–2 (H)	0–6
2002–03	UEFA Cup	QR	(Poland) Amica Wronki	0–5 (A)	2–7 (H) (Note: Match played at the Latham Park, Newtown)	2–12
2003–04	UEFA Cup	QR	(England) Manchester City	0–5 (A)	0–2 (H) (Note: Match played at the Millennium Stadium, Cardiff)	0–7
2004–05	UEFA Cup	1Q	(Sweden) Östers IF	0–2 (A)	1–2 (H)	1–4
2005–06	UEFA Champions League	1Q	(England) Liverpool	0–3 (A)	0–3 (H)	0–6
2006–07	UEFA Champions League	1Q	(Finland) MYPA	0–1 (A)	0–1 (H)	0–2
2007–08	UEFA Champions League	1Q	(Latvia) FK Ventspils	3–2 (H)	1–2 (A)	4–4 (a)
2008–09	UEFA Cup	1Q	(Lithuania) FK Sūduva	0–1 (A)	0–1 (H)	0–2
2009–10	UEFA Europa League	1Q	(Iceland) Fram Reykjavik	1–2 (A)	1–2 (H)	2–4
2010–11	UEFA Champions League	2Q	(Republic of Ireland) Bohemians	0–1 (A)	4–0 (H)	4–1
2010–11	UEFA Champions League	3Q	(Belgium) Anderlecht	1–3 (H)	0–3 (A)	1–6
2010–11	UEFA Europa League	PO	(Bulgaria) CSKA Sofia	0–3 (A)	2–2 (H)	2–5
2011–12	UEFA Europa League	1Q	(Northern Ireland) Cliftonville	1–1 (H)	1–0 (A)	2–1
2011–12	UEFA Europa League	2Q	(Denmark) FC Midtjylland	1–3 (H)	2–5 (A)	3–8
2012–13	UEFA Champions League	2Q	(Sweden) Helsingborgs IF	0–0 (H)	0–3 (A)	0–3
2013–14	UEFA Champions League	2Q	(Poland) Legia Warsaw	1–3 (H)	0–1 (A)	1–4
2014–15	UEFA Champions League	2Q	(Slovakia) ŠK Slovan Bratislava	0–1 (A)	0–2 (H)	0–3
2015–16	UEFA Champions League	1Q	(Faroe Islands) B36 Tórshavn	2–1 (A)	4–1 (H)	6–2
2015–16	UEFA Champions League	2Q	(Hungary) Videoton	0–1 (H)	1–1 (A)	1–2
2016–17	UEFA Champions League	1Q	(San Marino) Tre Penne	2–1 (H)	3–0 (A)	5–1
2016–17	UEFA Champions League	2Q	(Cyprus) APOEL	0–0 (H)	0–3 (A)	0–3
2017–18	UEFA Champions League	1Q	(Gibraltar) Europa FC	1–2 (H)	3–1 (A)	4–3
2017–18	UEFA Champions League	2Q	(Croatia) Rijeka	0–2 (A)	1–5 (H)	1–7
2018–19	UEFA Champions League	1Q	(North Macedonia) Shkëndija	0–5 (A)	4–0 (H)	4–5
2018–19	UEFA Europa League	2Q	(Gibraltar) Lincoln Red Imps	2–1 (H)	1–1 (A)	3–2
2018–19	UEFA Europa League	3Q	(Denmark) Midtjylland	0–2 (H) (Note: Match played at the Cardiff City Stadium, Cardiff)	1–3 (A)	1–5
2019–20	UEFA Champions League	1Q	(Kosovo) Feronikeli	2–2 (H)	1–0 (A)	3–2
2019–20	UEFA Champions League	2Q	(Denmark) Copenhagen	0–2 (H)	0–1 (A)	0–3
2019–20	UEFA Europa League	3Q	(Bulgaria) Ludogorets Razgrad	0–5 (A)	0–4 (H)	0–9
2020–21	UEFA Europa League	1Q	(Slovakia) Žilina	3–1 (a.e.t.) (H)	—N/a	—N/a
2020–21	UEFA Europa League	2Q	(Faroe Islands) B36 Tórshavn	2–2 (4–5 p) (A)	—N/a	—N/a
2021–22	UEFA Europa Conference League	1Q	(Northern Ireland) Glentoran	1–1 (A)	2–0 (H)	3–1
2021–22	UEFA Europa Conference League	2Q	(Lithuania) Kauno Žalgiris	5–0 (A)	5−1 (H)	10−1
2021–22	UEFA Europa Conference League	3Q	(Czech Republic) Viktoria Plzeň	4–2 (H)	1–3 (a.e.t.) (A)	5–5 (1–4 p)
2022–23	UEFA Champions League	1Q	(Northern Ireland) Linfield	1–0 (H)	0–2 (a.e.t.) (A)	1–2
2022–23	UEFA Europa Conference League	2Q	(Iceland) Víkingur Reykjavík	0–2 (A)	0–0 (H)	0–2
2023–24	UEFA Champions League	1Q	(Sweden) BK Häcken	1–3 (A)	0–2 (H)	1–5
2023–24	UEFA Europa Conference League	2Q	(Luxembourg) Swift Hesperange	1–1 (H)	2–3 (A)	3–4
2024–25	UEFA Champions League	1Q	(Montenegro) Dečić	3–0 (H)	1–1 (A)	4–1
2024–25	UEFA Champions League	2Q	(Hungary) Ferencváros	0–5 (A)	1–2 (H)	1–7
2024–25	UEFA Europa League	3Q	(Moldova) Petrocub Hîncești	0–1 (A)	0–0 (H)	0–1
2024–25	UEFA Conference League	PO	(Lithuania) Panevėžys	3–0 (A)	0–0 (H)	3–0
2024–25	UEFA Conference League	LP	(Italy) Fiorentina	0–2 (A)	—N/a	—N/a
2024–25	UEFA Conference League	LP	(Sweden) Djurgårdens IF	0–1 (H) (Note: Match played at the New Meadow, Shrewsbury)	—N/a	—N/a
2024–25	UEFA Conference League	LP	(Kazakhstan) Astana	2–0 (H)	—N/a	—N/a
2024–25	UEFA Conference League	LP	(Republic of Ireland) Shamrock Rovers	1–2 (A)	—N/a	—N/a
2024–25	UEFA Conference League	LP	(Greece) Panathinaikos	0–2 (H)	—N/a	—N/a
2024–25	UEFA Conference League	LP	(Slovenia) Celje	2–3 (A)	—N/a	—N/a
2025–26	UEFA Champions League	1Q	(North Macedonia) Shkëndija	0–0 (H)	1–2 (a.e.t.) (A)	1–2
2025–26	UEFA Conference League	2Q	(Luxembourg) Differdange 03	0–1 (H)	0–1 (A)	0–2
2026–27	UEFA Champions League	1Q	(Azerbaijan) Sabah	0–2 (A)	1–2 (H)	1–4
2026–27	UEFA Conference League	2Q	(Estonia) Flora			

Notes

- QR: Qualifying round
- 1Q: First qualifying round
- 2Q: Second qualifying round
- 3Q: Third qualifying round
- PO: Play-off round

== Honours ==
The New Saints/ TNS/ Total Network Solutions/ Llansantffraid honours
Type	Competition	Titles	Seasons
Domestic	Cymru Premier (Note: Upon its formation in 1992, the League of Wales became the top tier of Welsh football. In 2002 it was renamed the Welsh Premier League, and in 2011 changed to the current name, Cymru Premier.)	18	1999–2000, 2004–05, 2005–06, 2006–07, 2009–10, 2011–12, 2012–13, 2013–14, 2014–15, 2015–16, 2016–17, 2017–18, 2018–19, 2021–22, 2022–23, 2023–24, 2024–25, 2025–26
Domestic	Cymru Alliance	1	1992–93
Domestic	Welsh Cup	10	1995–96, 2004–05, 2011–12, 2013–14, 2014–15, 2015–16, 2018–19, 2021–22, 2022–23, 2024–25
Domestic	Welsh League Cup	11	1994–95, 2005–06, 2008–09, 2009–10, 2010–11, 2014–15, 2015–16, 2016–17, 2017–18, 2023–24, 2024–25
Domestic	Welsh Intermediate Cup	1	1992–93
Domestic	Montgomeryshire League Division 1	6	1968–69, 1969–70, 1982–83, 1986–87, 1991–92 (reserves), 1992–93 (reserves)
Domestic	Montgomeryshire League Division 2	2	1970–71, 1980–81
Domestic	Montgomeryshire League Cup	2	1973–74, 1974–75
Domestic	FAW Premier Cup	1	2006–07

- record

=== Minor titles ===
- Shropshire Senior Cup
  - Winners (1): 2011–12

=== Reserves and development/ youth teams ===
- FAW Reserve League North East – Champions: 2024–25 (reserves)
- Cymru Premier Development League National – Winners: 2023-24 (development team)
- FAW Reserve League North Cup – Winners: 2023–24
- FAW National Academi North Development League – Champions: 2024–25 (development team)
- Cymru Premier Development League National North – Champions: 2017–18, 2023-24 (development team)
- FAW Welsh Youth Cup – Winners (2): 2021–22, 2022–23

=== Individual stats ===
- Highest attendance: 14,563 against Liverpool, 2005
- First progression in European football (4–1) aggregate vs Bohemians, 2010

== Largest victories and losses ==
- Largest League of Wales win: 12–0 v. Airbus UK Broughton in November 2019.
- Largest League of Wales defeat: 0–10 v. Barry Town in 1997
- Largest Welsh Cup win: 16–0 v. Llangollen in October 2024
- Largest Shropshire Senior Cup win: 14–1 v. AFC Telford United on 20 July 2017

== Managers ==
Name	Time
(Wales) Graham Breeze	1992 – 1994
Ian Clarke	1994 – 1996
(Wales) Graham Breeze	1996 – 1997
(England) Tony Henry	1997 – 1998
(England) Andy Cale (first spell)	1998 – 2000
(England) Ken McKenna	1 January 2001 – 13 March 2008
(England) Andy Cale (second spell)	13 March 2008 – 30 June 2010
(Wales) Mike Davies	2010 – 2011
(Wales) Carl Darlington	6 April 2011 (Note: Darlington was appointed as Head Coach and the worked alongside Craig Harrison during Harrison's first spell at the club.) – December 2014
(England) Craig Harrison (first spell)	December 2011 – May 2017
(Wales) Scott Ruscoe	2017 – 2021
(Australia) Anthony Limbrick	2021 – 2022
(England) Craig Harrison (second spell)	4 August 2022 –

== First team technical staff ==
Position	Name
Head Coach	(England) Craig Harrison
Assistant Manager & Head of Coaching	(England) Christian Seargeant
First Team coach	(Wales) Simon Spender
First Team coach	(Wales) Simon Smith
Head of Sports Science and Player Performance	Daniel Leach
Head of Medical and Sports Therapy	(Wales) Phillip Davies
Performance Analyst	Ruben Maerivoet
Recruitment Assistant and Football Ambassador	(England) Ken McKenna
Club Doctor	(England) Dr. John Quigley

== Women's football ==
The New Saints Ladies FC was founded in 2002 and played in the FA Women's National League Midlands Division 1. In August 2020, it was announced that the women's section was splitting off and adopting the name Wem Town L.F.C. The new club claimed that women's football was low on TNS' list of priorities.

In June 2021, The New Saints F.C. Women were refounded and were granted a license to play in the Adran Premier, ahead of established top-flight clubs such as Abergavenny Town and Briton Ferry Llansawel. They continue to participate in the Adran Premier League, the highest tier of league competition in Welsh women's football, and also play their home games at Park Hall Stadium.

In the 2022–23 season, they finished in 4th place. The team became semi-professional with the 2024–25 season, the fourth such team in the Adran Premier. In that season they won their first silverware, beating Swansea 3 - 1 in the Adran Trophy final at Latham Park.

=== Women's Team technical staff ===
- Head coach Kieran Lee-Birch

=== League history ===
Season	League	Final position
2021–22	Adran Premier	6th
2022–23	Adran Premier	4th
2023–24	Adran Premier	5th
2024–25	Adran Premier	3rd
2025–26	Adran Premier	4th

=== Women's Team honours ===
- Adran Trophy
  - Winners (1): 2024–25

== See also ==
- Football in Shropshire
- List of association football clubs playing in the league of another country
