= Neath F.C. =

Former association football club in Wales

Neath
- Full name: Neath Football Club
- Nickname: The Eagles
- Founded: 2005 as Neath Athletic
- Dissolved: 2012
- Ground: The Gnoll; Neath
- Capacity: 6,000
- 2011–12: Welsh Premier League, 3rd (of 12)
Home colours	Away colours

Neath Football Club (Welsh: Clwb Pêl-droed Castell-nedd) was a Welsh professional association football club based in Neath last playing in the Welsh Premier League.

The club was formed in 2005 following the merger between Neath and Skewen Athletic. Originally known as Neath Athletic A.F.C. the club played its first two seasons in Welsh Football League Division One before being promoted to the Welsh Premier League.

The president of the club was Peter Hain M.P., the life vice-president was David Maddock who had been associated with the club and its predecessors (as player, committeeman and secretary) for over 56 years.

== History ==
The club was formed in 2005 as Neath Athletic after Neath and Skewen Athletic agreed to merge in an attempt to mount a better challenge to the Welsh Football League Division One title. Playing at the old ground of Neath F.C., Llandarcy Park, the new club proved a formidable force in the league, finishing second to Goytre United at their first attempt. Goytre United declined to step-up into the Welsh Premier League, meaning Neath Athletic could take their place. However, due to Llandarcy Park not meeting the required Welsh Premier League ground criteria, Neath was refused entry.

During the 2006–07 season, Neath Athletic won the Welsh Football League Division One. With this success and the improvements to Llandarcy Park, Neath Athletic was eligible to play in the Welsh Premier League. Success in the Welsh Football League was followed by a placing of seventh in their first season in the Welsh Premier League.

During summer 2008, Neath RFC agreed to allow Neath Athletic to share its home ground The Gnoll. With the move to a new home, the club also decided to rename itself Neath F.C. Following Neath's first match at The Gnoll against Swansea City, the two clubs announced a partnership that would enable Swansea to send players on loan to Neath to gain first team experience. The first such players to join Neath were Kyle Graves, Dion Chambers and Kerry Morgan.

On 23 April 2009, just a couple of days before the end of the 2008–09 Welsh Premier League season, Neath announced plans to go full-time for the 2009–10 season to challenge the likes of Llanelli AFC and Rhyl for the Welsh Premier League title.

On 13 July 2010, Neath announced the double signing of two marquee players in readiness for the 2010–11 season, former Swansea City favourites Kristian O'Leary and Lee Trundle. A year later came the signing of Matthew Rees a former Swansea defender and ex Port Talbot Town captain.

Several other key signings followed transforming Neath into title contenders with a minimum expectation for the club's first European qualification. Attendances at The Gnoll doubled for the 2010/2011 season as a combination of high-profile signings and good results appear to be paying dividends.

On 21 May 2011, Neath defeated Prestatyn Town 3–2 at The Gnoll in front of a club record 1,000 fans in the first ever Europa League Play-off. Chad Bond put Neath ahead after 12 seconds before two late goals from long-serving Andy Hill secured Neath's debut in Europe.

At the end of the 2011–12 season the club were refused both FAW domestic and UEFA licences for the 2012–13 season and were declared ineligible to participate in the end-of-season Europa League play-offs.

On 28 May 2012, the club was wound up, at the High Court.

=== League history ===
Season	League Contested	Tier	Pld	W	D	L	GF	GA	GD	Pts	League Position	Avg. Home Attendance
2005–06	Welsh Football League; Division One	2	34	22	7	5	76	32	+44	73	2nd of 18	n/a
2006–07	Welsh Football League; Division One	2	36	29	5	2	100	32	+68	92	1st of 19; Promoted	n/a
2007–08	Welsh Premier League	1	34	15	9	10	57	52	+5	54	7th of 18	211
2008–09	Welsh Premier League	1	34	10	4	20	43	65	-18	34	14th of 18	260
2009–10	Welsh Premier League	1	34	12	11	11	41	38	+3	47	9th of 18	221
2010–11	Welsh Premier League	1	32	16	10	6	62	41	+21	58	3rd of 12	569
2011–12	Welsh Premier League	1	32	18	8	6	60	36	+24	62	3rd of 12; Relegated	

P = Position; Pld = Matches played; W = Matches won; D = Matches drawn; L = Matches lost; GF = Goals for; GA = Goals against; GD = Goal difference; Pts = Points;

== Stadium ==
The Gnoll
- Location: Dyfed Road, Neath
- Owner: Neath RFC
- Operator: Neath RFC

Construction
- Groundbreaking: 1848

Tenants
- Neath RFC (Welsh Premier Division) (1871–present); Neath F.C. (2008–2012); South Wales Scorpions Rugby league Club (2010–present)

When first formed, the club had a choice of both grounds of the merged clubs, Llandarcy Park of Neath F.C. and Tennant Park of Skewen Athletic F.C.. As Llandarcy Park was the better of the two Neath Athletic decided to call it home.

== Honours ==
=== League ===
- Welsh Football League Division One
  - 2006–07

== European record ==
UEFA Europa League:

Season	Round	Country	Club	Home	Away	Aggregate
2011–12	Q1	(Norway)	Aalesunds FK	0–2	1–4	1–6
