= Latham Park =

Stadium in Newtown, Wales

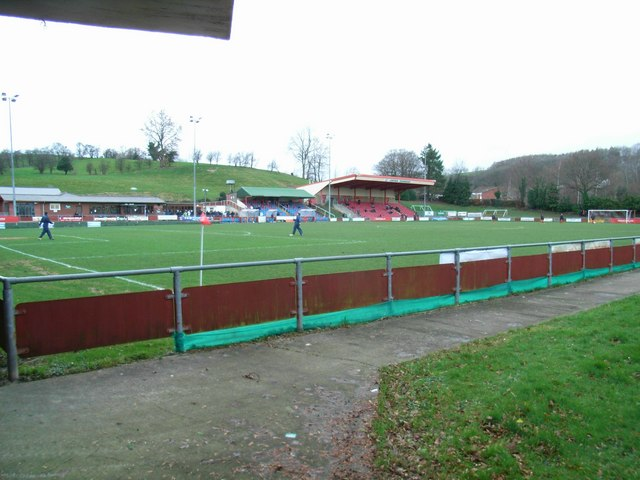
- Location: Newtown, Powys, Wales
- Coordinates: 52.51152°N 3.322876°W
- Type: Association football stadium
- Capacity: 5,000
- Record attendance: 5,004 (June 1956)
- Opened: August 1951

Tenants
- Newtown A.F.C.

Website
- newtownafc.co.uk/venue/latham-park/

Latham Park is a multi-purpose stadium in Newtown, Wales. It is currently used for football matches and is the home ground of Newtown A.F.C. The stadium holds 5,000 people and is named after Wales international footballer George Latham (1881–1939), who began his footballing career at the club.

In the late 1940s, the Officials and General Committee of Newtown A.F.C. decided a new venue had to be constructed. Latham Park opened in August 1951, and it has been the home of Newtown A.F.C. since. The first competitive game at the stadium took place on 25 August, 1951, between Newtown and Aberystwyth, with Newtown winning with 4 - 0, in the Central Wales League, with the stadium housing 1,211 spectators.

The site's largest number of spectators was for a 28 June 1956 game, between Newtown and Swansea City in the Welsh Cup, with 5,004 attendees. The stadium has also hosted the first non-league international between Wales and England, as well as some UEFA Youth Internationals.

The stadium's capacity is 5,000, with 210 seats in the original stand and a covered section for 500 attendees. During the 1997/98 football season, a 400-seat stand was completed. In July 1996, the venue staged a UEFA Cup fixture.

The stadium was fitted with floodlights and re-opened on 24 September 1979, as the club played against Wrexham. It was hoped that the floodlights would allow more games to be hosted.

The stadium's Control Techniques stand contains 420 covered seats, as well as the dressing rooms used by the club and for general community use. The old stand along Llanidloes Road was also renovated with new seating.

A further stand has been constructed at the Llanidloes Road "Allotment End" side of the ground and the old "Shed" stand has been improved with new seating as well as new dugout facilities. The function room and social club has also seen a new extension built on to the club house.

During the 2004/05 season, the club house underwent an extension, as a new function room was built, with a capacity of 200. The site's floodlights were upgraded, and a new pitch drainage system installed.

In October 2009 a new media room with balcony was added, which also acts as an exclusive sponsors' lounge on club match days.

In early 2004, the site was the first club stadium in the Welsh Premier to be awarded a UEFA Licence. Following the awarding, the club has hosted UEFA cup ties of Newtown, against Skonto Riga (1996) and Wisła Kraków (1998), as well as U21, U18 and U15 internationals, full ladies internationals, and Champions League and UEFA ties for other Welsh Premier Clubs. The Welsh Cup final has been hosted on two occasions at the ground and the Welsh League Cup final eight times.

It was sponsored by 2016, by Mid Wales Leisure, as Mid Wales Leisure Latham Park. The ground is currently sponsored by Paveways and is known as Paveways Latham Park.

In March 2014, the club announced they were to replace their pitch with an artificial one, costing £440,000. In July 2014, the stadium's pitch was changed to a "third generation" artificial turf; this made the club, the second Welsh Premier League club, after The New Saints, to change their grass turf for this new type of turf. The new surface allowed the renting of the pitch to other junior clubs and organisations, as well as for community activities. Funding for the new pitch was provided the Football Association of Wales and from Sport Wales.

In 2019, the stadium hosted matches of the Welsh Trophy and Welsh Cup. In 2021, the site did not meet criteria to host European matches.
