= Port Talbot Town F.C. =

Association football club in Port Talbot, Wales

Port Talbot Town FC
- Full name: Port Talbot Town Football Club
- Nickname: The Steelmen
- Founded: 1901; 125 years ago (as Port Talbot Athletic)
- Ground: Victoria Road, Port Talbot
- Capacity: 6,000 (1,000 seated)
- Manager: Richard Ryan
- League: Ardal SW League
- 2025–26: South Wales Premier League Premier Division, 1st of 13 (promoted)
Home colours	Away colours

Port Talbot Town Football Club (Welsh: Clwb Pêl Droed Port Talbot) is a Welsh football club from Port Talbot. It was founded in 1901 as Port Talbot Athletic. The club plays in the Ardal SW League, and is based at Victoria Road.

== History ==
Formed in 1901, Port Talbot began life as a member of the Swansea Senior League and continued playing following the hiatus due to World War One. Although records are sparse, the club is thought to have played in the Swansea Senior League until 1926, when it became a founder of the Port Talbot and District Association Football League; and to have competed in the Welsh League Division 2 Western from the 1928–29 season onwards under the name Seaside Athletic.

Although the club can trace rather tenuous roots back to 1901, the modern club originated shortly after World War II as Port Talbot Athletic.

The club gained promotion to Division 1 in 1956–57, but was relegated after one season. It regained promotion as Division 2 West champions in 1961–62 but was relegated again after one season. The pattern of promotion and relegation after a year was repeated for the third time when Port Talbot went down at the end of the 1970–71 season.

Port Talbot was promoted into the League of Wales in 2000, and changed its name to Port Talbot Town in 2001. Port Talbot's rivalry with Afan Lido, located less than half a mile away, is considered one of the fiercest in South Wales.

Port Talbot finished third in 2009–10, gaining a berth in the Europa League 2010–11, its first appearance in European Competition. However, the club was vanquished 7–1 on aggregate by Finnish side Turun Palloseura in the first qualifying round, which included a 0–4 thrashing in the home fixture on 8 July 2010 with 676 in attendance.

During the 2015–16 Welsh Premier League season Andy Dyer's Blues make it to the semi-final stage of the Welsh Cup against Airbus, but lost in a 7–0 drubbing.

Weeks later the Football Association of Wales relegated Port Talbot from the Welsh Premier League although the club had finished above the relegation places in tenth spot. The relegation was the consequence of the FAW's decision to refuse Port Talbot a Domestic License on financial grounds. The club appealed the decision but the appeal was rejected. The club then overhauled its internal structure, appointing a new chairman, vice-chairman, secretary and treasurer, and forming a steering committee consisting of both staff and supporters. The wage bill for the 2016–17 was cut massively in order to keep the club financially sustainable. This was done largely by replacing some of the existing squad with players from the academy.

At the end of the 2018–19 season Port Talbot finished 13th, avoiding relegation by one spot. However the club were refused the FAW Tier 2 certification required to play in the newly formed Cymru South for the 2019–20 season. The appeals body upheld this decision and the club was demoted to the new Tier 3 Welsh Football League Division One. Following the cessation of the 2019–20 season due to the COVID-19 pandemic, Port Talbot achieved promotion back to the Cymru South at the first attempt with a third-place finish on the unweighted points per games method.

== Support ==
Average home attendance for Port Talbot Town matches between 1994 and 2010 was 207, although some attendances at the Victoria Road Stadium have been notably higher, including the 2,640 spectators who watched Port Talbot defeat Football League side Swansea City 2–1 in an FAW Premier Cup quarter final in 2007, during the Swans' run-away promotion year. Also, an estimated 400 supporters travelled to the 2010 Welsh Cup final in Llanelli between Port Talbot and three-time winners Bangor City, won by Bangor 3–2. Port Talbot has become renowned for its vocal following in recent years, if not for its performance on the pitch or in the boardroom.

== European record ==
Season	Competition	Round	Club	Home	Away	Aggregate
2010–11	UEFA Europa League	First qualifying round	(Finland) TPS Turku	0–4	1–3	1–7

== Records ==
- Biggest League of Wales win: 7–0 v Elements Cefn Druids, 16 February 2010
- Biggest League of Wales defeat: 8–0 vs Llanelli, 26 October 2007

== Current staff ==
- Manager: Richard Ryan (Wales)
- Coach: Michael Chaves (Wales)
- Coach: Phil Williams (Wales)
- Coach: Robert Cockings (Wales)
- Coach: Jonathan Hubschmid (Wales)
- Physio : Lilly Richardson (Wales)

== Managers ==
- (Wales) Stephen Llewellyn (1993–1997)
- (Wales) David Rees (1997–2000)
- (Wales) Simon Dyer (2000–2001)
- (Wales) Wayne Goodridge (2001)
- (Wales) Vince Lewis (interim) (2001)
- (Wales) Mark Jones (2001–2004)
- (Wales) Wayne Davies (2004–2007)
- (Wales) Tony Pennock (2007)
- (Wales) Nicky Tucker (2007–2008)
- (Wales) Mark Jones (2008–2012)
- (Wales) Scott Young (2012–2014)
- (Wales) Jarred Harvey (2014)
- (Northern Ireland) Bernard McNally (2014–2015)
- (Wales) Andy Dyer (2015–2016)
- (Wales) Paul Evans (2016–2018)
- (Wales) Cortez Belle (2018)
- (Wales) Mark Pike (2018–2021)
- (Northern Ireland) Conor Mcgaharan (2021–2022)
- (Wales) Jonathan Davies (2022–2024)
- (Wales) Richard Ryan (2024–Present)
