= List of Welsh Premier League seasons =

The Welsh Premier League is the top division of Welsh football. This is the list of the league's seasons.

== Seasons ==
Season	Champions	European qualifiers^{[a]}	Relegated from the League	Promoted to the League	Top scorer^{[b]}	
Season	Champions	European qualifiers^{[a]}	Relegated from the League	Promoted to the League	Player	Goals
1992–93	Cwmbran Town		Llanidloes Town; Abergavenny Thursdays	Llansantffraid^{[CA]} Ton Pentre^{[WFL]}	Steve Woods (Ebbw Vale)	29
1993–94	Bangor City	Inter Cardiff	Haverfordwest County; Briton Ferry Athletic	Rhyl^{[CA]} Barry Town^{[WFL]}	Dave Taylor (Porthmadog)	43
1994–95	Bangor City	Afan Lido	Mold Alexandra; Maesteg Park	Cemaes Bay^{[CA]} Briton Ferry Athletic^{[WFL]} Caernarfon Town^{[c]}	Frank Mottram (Bangor City)	31
1995–96	Barry Town	Newtown	Afan Lido; Llanelli	Welshpool Town^{[CA]} Carmarthen Town^{[WFL]}	Ken McKenna (Conwy United)	38
1996–97	Barry Town	Inter CableTel	Ton Pentre^{[d]} Holywell Town; Briton Ferry Athletic	Rhayader Town^{[CA]} Haverfordwest County^{[WNL]}	Tony Bird (Barry Town)	42
1997–98	Barry Town	Newtown	Porthmadog; Flint Town United; Welshpool Town; Cemaes Bay	Holywell Town^{[CA]} Afan Lido^{[WFL]}	Eifion Williams (Barry Town)	40
1998–99	Barry Town	Inter Cardiff; Cwmbran Town	Holywell Town; Ebbw Vale^{[e]}	Flexys Cefn Druids^{[CA]} Llanelli^{[WFL]}	Eifion Williams (Barry Town)	28
1999–2000	Total Network Solutions	Barry Town; Bangor City	Conwy United; Caernarfon Town	Oswestry Town^{[CA]} Port Talbot Town^{[WFL]}	Chris Summers (Cwmbran Town)	28
2000–01	Barry Town	Cwmbran Town; Total Network Solutions	Inter Cardiff	Caernarfon Town^{[CA]}	Graham Evans (Caersws)	25
2001–02	Barry Town	Total Network Solutions; Bangor City	Rhayader Town	Welshpool Town^{[CA]}	Marc Lloyd-Williams (Bangor City)	47
2002–03	Barry Town	Cwmbran Town; Total Network Solutions	Llanelli	Porthmadog^{[CA]}	Graham Evans (Caersws)	24
2003–04	Rhyl	Haverfordwest County; Total Network Solutions	Barry Town	Airbus UK Broughton^{[CA]} Llanelli^{[WFL]}	Graham Evans (Caersws)^{[f]}	24
2004–05	Total Network Solutions	Carmarhten Town; Rhyl	Afan Lido	Cardiff Grange Harlequins^{[WFL]}	Marc Lloyd-Williams (Total Network Solutions)	31
2005–06	Total Network Solutions	Llanelli; Rhyl	Cardiff Grange Harlequins		Rhys Griffiths (Port Talbot Town)	28
2006–07	The New Saints	Carmarhten Town; Rhyl	Cwmbran Town	Llangefni Town^{[CA]} Neath Athletic^{[WFL]}	Rhys Griffiths (Llanelli)	30
2007–08	Llanelli	The New Saints	Llangefni Town	Prestatyn Town^{[CA]}	Rhys Griffiths (Llanelli)	40
2008–09	Rhyl	Llanelli; The New Saints	Caernarfon Town	Bala Town^{[CA]}	Rhys Griffiths (Llanelli)	31
2009–10	The New Saints	Llanelli; Port Talbot Town	Rhyl^{[g]} Gap Connah's Quay; Porthmadog; Technogroup Welshpool Town; Caersws; Elements Cefn Druids		Rhys Griffiths (Llanelli)	30
2010–11	Bangor City	The New Saints; Neath	Haverfordwest County	Afan Lido^{[WFL]}	Rhys Griffiths (Llanelli)	25
2011–12	The New Saints	Bangor City; Llanelli	Neath	Gap Connah's Quay^{[CA]}	Rhys Griffiths (Llanelli)	24
2012–13	The New Saints	Airbus UK Broughton; Bala Town	Llanelli	Rhyl^{[CA]}	Michael Wilde (The New Saints)	25
2013–14	The New Saints	Airbus UK Broughton; TBD	Afan Lido	Cefn Druids^{[CA]}	TBD (TBD)	TBD

== Notes ==
- ^{a} Providing that the league champions have qualified for Europe by winning the league, these are the clubs who have qualified to play in Europe through the league only.
- ^{b} Includes only goals scored in the League of Wales/Welsh Premier League.
- ^{c} Caernarfon Town gained League of Wales membership prior to the 1994-95 season and subsequently left the Northern Premier League Division One.
- ^{d} Ton Pentre withdrew from the league at the end of the 1996–97 season after finding to continue was proving to be financially difficult.
- ^{e} Ebbw Vale were expelled from the league before the 1992–93 season began due to financial difficulties, and promptly went out of business.
- ^{f} Graham Evans was awarded the Golden Boot after Andy Moran was tested positive for a banned substance.
- ^{g} Rhyl were denied the domestic licence for competing in the 2010–11 Welsh Premier League and were therefore relegated to the second tier. Welsh Premier League aspirants Llangefni Town (Cymru Alliance) and Afan Lido (Welsh Football League Division One) were also denied licences meaning that no team from the second tier was promoted. Since these three teams failed to obtain licences, the best three teams originally to be relegated, with all three obtaining their licences, were spared from relegation (Bala Town, Haverfordwest County and Newtown AFC).
- ^{CA} Clubs that have gained promotion from the Cymru Alliance.
- ^{WFL} Clubs that have gained promotion from the Welsh Football League Division One.
