= List of Cymru Premier clubs =

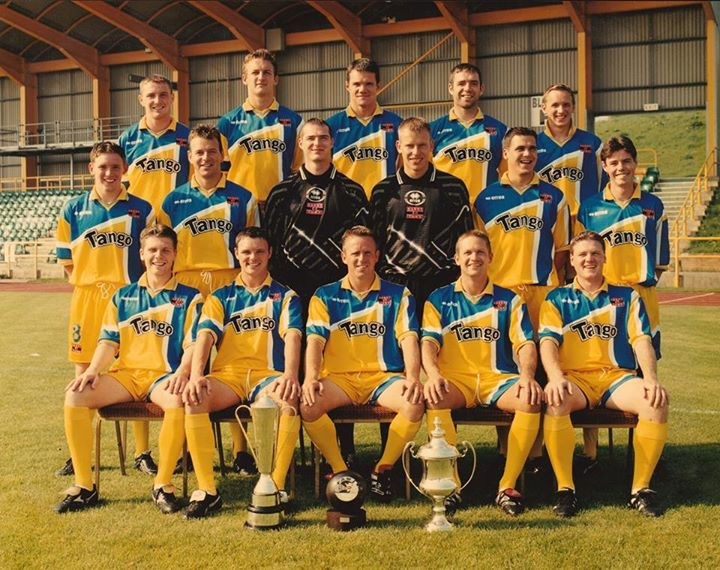
Barry Town United (then known simply as Barry Town) won the league title seven times in nine seasons

The Cymru Premier is an association football league based in Wales. Formed in 1992 as the League of Wales, it was the first national football league in the country. The competition changed its name to the Welsh Premier League in 2002 and then to the Cymru Premier in 2019. In its inaugural season 20 teams played in the league, but it has been restructured since and has 12 member clubs in the 2024–25 season. Although it is the highest level of the Welsh football league system, the Welsh Premier League does not include the country's four largest professional clubs, Cardiff City, Swansea City, Wrexham and Newport County; for historical reasons these clubs all play within the English league system. As of 2024, The New Saints, who have played in Oswestry in England since 2005, are the only full-time professional team in the league. Many of the clubs that have played in the league were founded in the 19th century and spent a century or more playing in regional leagues before the creation of the League of Wales in 1992.

Since its formation, 42 clubs have taken part in the league. The only clubs to have played in the league in every season since it was formed are Aberystwyth Town and Newtown. Conversely two other founder members, Abergavenny Thursdays and Llanidloes Town, were relegated at the end of the league's inaugural season and have never returned. Two other clubs, Llangefni Town and Cardiff Grange Harlequins, have spent only a single season in the league. The most recent team to make its debut in the league was Colwyn Bay, who gained promotion to the league for the first time in 2023. A system of promotion and relegation exists between the Cymru Premier and the two regional leagues at the second level of the Welsh league system, the Cymru North in the northern half of the country and the Cymru South in the southern half.

== Clubs ==
The table shows the first and most recent season in which each club competed in the league up to and including the 2023–24 season. Some clubs' membership was intermittent between their first and last season. The name shown for each club is the most recent, and the table is initially sorted in alphabetical order of these names. Any other names under which the club played in the league are shown in footnotes. A dagger symbol (†) indicates that the club was a founder member of the league.

List of Cymru Premier clubs
Club	Founded	First season	Most recent season	Total seasons	Best finish	Times champions	2023–24 status	Ref(s).
Abergavenny Thursdays †	1927	1992–93	1992–93	1	20th	–	Defunct; folded in 2013	
Aberystwyth Town †	1884	1992–93	2023–24	32	4th	–	Playing in Cymru Premier	
Afan Lido †	1967	1992–93	2013–14	14	2nd	–	Playing in Cymru South	
Airbus UK Broughton^{[nb1]}	1946	2004–05	2022–23	15	2nd	–	Playing in Cymru North	
Bala Town	1880	2009–10	2023–24	15	2nd	–	Playing in Cymru Premier	
Bangor City †	1876	1992–93	2017–18	26	1st	3	Inactive	
Barry Town United	1912	1994–95	2023–24	15	1st	7	Playing in Cymru Premier	
Briton Ferry Athletic †	1925	1992–93	1996–97	4	17th	–	Merged with Llansawel in 2009 to form Briton Ferry Llansawel	
Caernarfon Town	1937	1995–96	2023–24	19	5th	–	Playing in Cymru Premier	
Caersws †	1887	1992–93	2009–10	18	4th	–	Playing in Cymru North	
Cardiff Grange Harlequins	1935	2005–06	2005–06	1	18th	–	Defunct; folded in 2015	
Cardiff Metropolitan University †^{[nb10]}	2000	1992–93	2023–24	17	2nd	–	Playing in Cymru Premier	
Carmarthen Town	1950	1996–97	2019–20	24	3rd	–	Playing in Cymru South	
Cefn Druids^{[nb3]}	1872	1999–2000	2021–22	18	5th	–	Inactive	
Cemaes Bay^{[nb2]}	1976	1995–96	1997–98	3	12th	–	Playing in North Wales Coast West Football League	
Colwyn Bay	1881	2023–24	2023–24	1	–	–	Playing in Cymru Premier	
Connah's Quay Nomads †^{[nb4]}	1946	1992–93	2023–24	30	1st	1	Playing in Cymru Premier	
Conwy Borough †	1977	1992–93	1999–2000	8	3rd	–	Playing in Ardal NW	
Cwmbran Town †	1951	1992–93	2006–07	15	1st	1	Playing in Gwent County League Premier Division	
Ebbw Vale †	1888	1992–93	1997–98	6	3rd	–	Defunct; folded in 1998	
Flint Town United †	1886	1992–93	2022–23	8	4th	–	Playing in Cymru North	
Haverfordwest County †	1899	1992–93	2023–24	20	2nd	–	Playing in Cymru Premier	
Holywell Town †	1880	1992–93	1998–99	6	5th	–	Playing in Cymru North	
Llandudno ^{[nb5]}	1878	2015–16	2018–19	4	3rd	–	Playing in Cymru North	
Llanelli Town †	1896	1992–93	2018–19	18	1st	1	Playing in Cymru South	
Llangefni Town	1897	2007–08	2007–08	1	18th	–	Playing in Ardal NW	
Llanidloes Town †	1875	1992–93	1992–93	1	19th	–	Playing in Cymru North	
Maesteg Park Athletic †	1945	1992–93	1994–95	3	15th	–	Defunct; folded in 2010	
Mold Alexandra †	1929	1992–93	1994–95	3	13th	–	Playing in Cymru North	
Neath^{[nb6]}	1922	2007–08	2011–12	5	3rd	–	Defunct; folded in 2012	
The New Saints^{[nb9]}	1959	1993–94	2023–24	31	1st	13	Playing in Cymru Premier	
Newtown †	1875	1992–93	2023–24	32	2nd	–	Playing in Cymru Premier	
Oswestry Town	2003	2000–01	2002–03	3	15th	–	Merged with The New Saints in 2003	
Penybont	2013	2019–20	2023–24	4	3rd	–	Playing in Cymru Premier	
Pontypridd United	1992	2022–23	2023–24	2	8th	–	Playing in Cymru Premier	
Port Talbot Town^{[nb7]}	1901	2000–01	2015–16	16	3rd	–	Playing in Ardal SW	
Porthmadog †	1884	1992–93	2009–10	13	9th	–	Playing in Cymru North	
Prestatyn Town	1910	2008–09	2014–15	7	5th	–	Playing in Cymru North	
Rhayader Town	2007	1997–98	2001–02	5	12th	–	Playing in Central Wales Football League Southern Division	
Rhyl	1878	1994–95	2016–17	20	1st	2	Defunct; folded in 2020	
Welshpool Town^{[nb8]}	1877	1996–97	2009–10	10	4th	–	Playing in Ardal NE	
Ton Pentre	1896	1993–94	1996–97	4	3rd	–	Playing in South Wales Alliance League Premier Division	

== Notes ==
1. ^{nb1} Known as Airbus UK until 2007
2. ^{nb2} Known as Cemaes Ynys Mon from 1997 until 1998
3. ^{nb3} Known as Flexsys Cefn Druids until 2003, NEWI Cefn Druids from 2003 until 2009, and Elements Cefn Druids from 2009 until 2010
4. ^{nb4} Known as Gap Connah's Quay from 2008 to 2017
5. ^{nb5} Known as MBi Llandudno from 2015 to 2016
6. ^{nb6} Known as Neath Athletic until 2008
7. ^{nb7} Known as Port Talbot Athletic until 2001
8. ^{nb8} Known as Technogroup Welshpool between 2009 and 2011
9. ^{nb9} Known as Llansantffraid until 1997 and Total Network Solutions from 1997 until 2006. Merged with fellow Welsh Premier League club Oswestry Town in 2003, continuing under the Total Network Solutions name.
10. ^{nb10} Inter Cardiff played in the Welsh Premier League until 2000, but was known as Inter Cable Tel from 1996 until 1999. In 2000 the club merged with UWIC of the Welsh Football League to form UWIC Inter Cardiff and continued to play in the Welsh Premier League. The club adopted its current name in 2012.
