= Nigel Adkins =

English footballer and manager

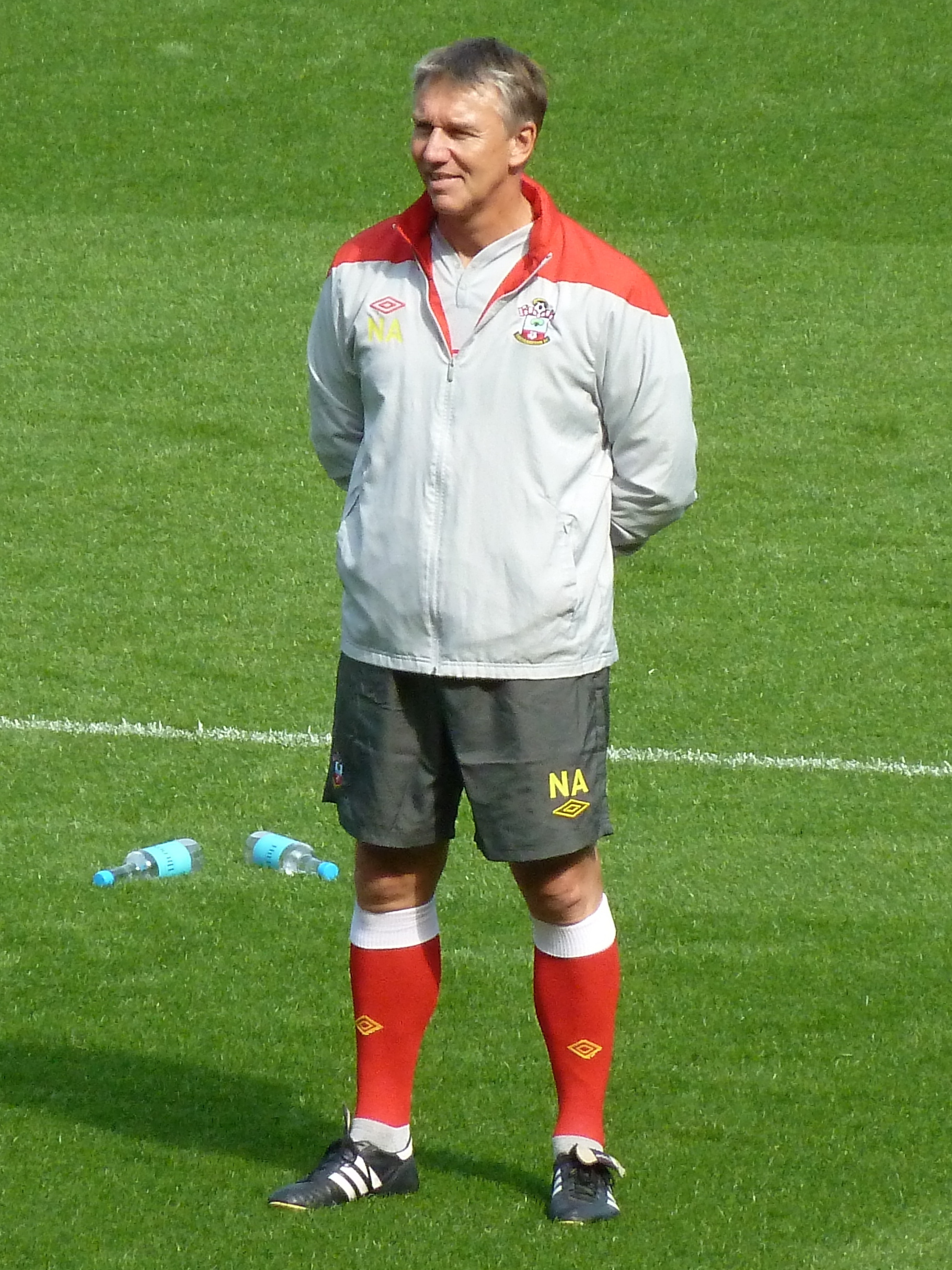
- Adkins as Southampton manager in 2011

Personal information
- Full name: Nigel Howard Adkins
- Date of birth: 11 March 1965 (age 61)
- Place of birth: Birkenhead, England
- Position: Goalkeeper

Youth career
- Liverpool

Senior career*
Years	Team	Apps	(Gls)
1983–1986	Tranmere Rovers	86	(0)
1986–1993	Wigan Athletic	155	(0)
1993–1996	Bangor City	95	(0)
Total		336	(0)

Managerial career
- 1993–1996: Bangor City
- 2006–2010: Scunthorpe United
- 2010–2013: Southampton
- 2013–2014: Reading
- 2015–2016: Sheffield United
- 2017–2019: Hull City
- 2021: Charlton Athletic
- 2023–2025: Tranmere Rovers
- * Club domestic league appearances and goals

Nigel Howard Adkins (born 11 March 1965) is an English professional football manager and former footballer and physiotherapist. He was most recently the manager and technical director at Tranmere Rovers.

Adkins played as a goalkeeper for Tranmere Rovers and Wigan Athletic. He finished his playing career and began his managerial career at Welsh club Bangor City before joining Scunthorpe United's backroom staff. As the club's physio, Adkins was appointed as caretaker manager before receiving the job permanently. He led the club to the League One title in 2006–07. However, the club were relegated from the Championship the following season but would return the following season after winning the 2009 play-off final. He also led Scunthorpe to the 2009 Football League Trophy final that season. After managing to keep Scunthorpe in the Championship, he joined League One club Southampton. He led the club to two successive promotions as runners-up, reaching the Premier League. He was sacked by the club in January 2013 and later moved to fellow Premier League club Reading. He was unable to keep Reading in the division and was sacked during the following season. He has subsequently had spells as manager at Sheffield United, Hull City and Charlton Athletic. In 2023, he joined Tranmere Rovers, initially as a technical director before becoming manager permanently in November 2023. In February 2025, he stepped down by mutual agreement.

== Playing career ==
Adkins began his career at Liverpool, but was released without playing a first team game. In 1983, he joined Tranmere Rovers and made 86 league appearances in three years. In 1986, he transferred to Wigan Athletic, the club where he spent the majority of his career, playing 155 league games between 1986 and 1993. He suffered a double spinal fracture at age 23, which curtailed his career. Adkins joined Bangor City as player-manager in 1993, making 95 league appearances and guiding them to consecutive championships before leaving the club in 1996. Adkins subsequently retired from playing at age 31, having made 336 league appearances in a 13-year career.

Following his retirement from playing, Adkins graduated from the University of Salford with a degree in physiotherapy and joined the physiotherapy department at Scunthorpe United.

== Managerial career ==
=== Bangor City ===
Adkins began his managerial career in 1993 as the player-manager of Bangor City in the League of Wales where he won the championship in the 1993–94 and 1994–95 seasons, before departing in February 1996.

=== Scunthorpe United ===
Adkins was appointed caretaker manager by Scunthorpe United chairman Steve Wharton in November 2006, following the departure of the previous manager, Brian Laws. After his spell as caretaker, he was appointed as permanent manager on 7 December 2006. As Adkins had been promoted to the manager's seat from the role of club physiotherapist, Scunthorpe supporters chanted, "Who needs Mourinho, we've got our physio!" on the terraces of Glanford Park in his honour.

Adkins guided Scunthorpe to promotion from League One to the Championship with three matches to spare on 14 April 2007, and they went on to seal the divisional title to end an absence of more than 40 years from the league's second tier.

Scunthorpe were relegated from the Championship the following season, but returned via the League One play-offs in May 2009, playing at Wembley Stadium in consecutive months, having played Luton Town in the final of the Football League Trophy on 5 April. They struggled once again in the higher division, but this time avoided relegation by finishing 20th and being five points clear of Sheffield Wednesday – the last relegated club.

=== Southampton ===
Adkins joined Southampton on 12 September 2010, after the Saints and Scunthorpe United agreed a compensation package. Adkins signed a three-year contract and was joined there by his former assistant at Scunthorpe, Andy Crosby. He gained his first victory in charge in his third game winning 1–0 at Sheffield Wednesday, with Lee Barnard scoring the only goal. The good start to his tenure continued and he guided Southampton into the play-off part of the table for the first time in League One on 2 November 2010 after a 4–0 win over Dagenham & Redbridge. After this result, the club joined the League One promotion rush, which was expected of them at the start of the campaign, and before the slow start. In the club's 125th anniversary match, Adkins saw his side beat Peterborough United 4–1. This was the sixth consecutive home win, the best home form for the football club since 1992.

Adkins guided his team into the top two for the first time since being relegated, after a 4–0 win over Exeter City on New Year's Day 2011 and managed a victory against Premier League opposition in Blackpool just one week later, taking his side into the fourth round of the FA Cup. Three days later he led his side to a 6–0 win away to Oldham Athletic and in the process recorded their fifth-straight victory. During Adkins' first transfer window at the club, he secured the contract of winger Adam Lallana for a new four-and-a-half-year contract. He signed winger Dany N'Guessan on loan from Leicester City, and signed Jonathan Forte on a three-and-a-half-year contract from Adkins' former club Scunthorpe United. Under the guidance of Adkins, the Saints achieved a club record of clean sheets in one season, beating the previous record of 19 set by Peter Shilton in the early 1980s. Adkins guided his side to promotion into the Championship after a 3–1 home win against Walsall on 7 May 2011, earning his third League One promotion in his managerial career behind champions Brighton and Hove Albion. He won the League One Manager of the Month for April 2011 after winning seven of the eight games that month and putting Southampton on the brink of promotion.

He then broke a 12-year hoodoo of not winning on the opening day of the league season by beating Leeds United at St Mary's Stadium 3–1 and send them straight into second in the Championship. In the process, he also broke a record by leading Southampton to seven consecutive league wins for the first time in their history. Two subsequent away wins – against Barnsley (1–0) and Ipswich Town (5–2) – kept Southampton top of the Championship. The club record of consecutive league victories extended to ten after a 1–0 win at home to Millwall. They suffered a minor blip in their next game, a 3–2 defeat at Leicester, but bounced back winning 3–1 in the second round of the League Cup at Swindon Town. Adkins then guided the Saints to two successive home wins in a week; 3–2 over Nottingham Forest and 4–1 against Birmingham City. The Saints continued their remarkable start to the season and only lost 2 of their first 17 games. Despite a wobbly period around Christmas time, Adkins guided Southampton to a 12-game unbeaten run which kept them in the top two. Saints finally secured promotion to the Premier League on the final day of the season, beating Coventry City 4–0 at St Mary's in front of a club-record crowd. Adkins was the first Southampton manager to gain back-to-back promotions and kept Southampton in the top two all season.

Adkins took charge of his first Premier League match as Southampton manager on 19 August 2012, losing 3–2 away to reigning champions Manchester City despite being 2–1 up with 18 minutes of the game remaining. His first top flight win came on 22 September 2012, beating Aston Villa 4–1 at St Mary's.

In October 2012, Adkins disclosed that he recites the Dale Wimbrow poem, The Guy in The Glass to control stress.

After much speculation over his future, on 18 January 2013 it was confirmed that Adkins had been sacked as Southampton manager and replaced by former Espanyol manager Mauricio Pochettino. As Adkins and Southampton were unable to agree the terms of his compensation package, Adkins commenced legal action for breach of contract in March 2013.

=== Reading ===
On 26 March 2013, Adkins was appointed manager at fellow Premier League club Reading in succession to Brian McDermott, who had been dismissed a fortnight earlier. His first game in charge ended in a 4–1 defeat away to Arsenal on 30 March 2013. Adkins could not stop Reading from being relegated, and they started the 2013–14 season in the Championship. On 15 December 2014, Adkins was sacked following his side's 6–1 defeat to Birmingham which left them ten points behind a play-off place in the Championship.

=== Sheffield United ===
On 2 June 2015, Adkins was appointed as the manager at League One club Sheffield United. Sheffield United ended the season in 11th place, their lowest league position since 1983, eight points from the play-offs. Because of this, Adkins was sacked on 12 May 2016.

=== Hull City ===
On 7 December 2017, Adkins was appointed as the manager of Championship club Hull City, signing an 18-month contract, following the dismissal of Leonid Slutsky. He took over the Tigers while they sat in 20th place, three points adrift from the relegation drop and five from bottom. His first game in charge, a 3–2 victory over Brentford, saw the club rise up to 18th place. At the end of the season, City finished in 18th place, eight points above the relegation places.

In his first full season in charge, Adkins led the club to a 13th-place finish, winning 17 of their 46 games. During this league campaign, he won the divisional Manager of the Month award for December, in which his player Jarrod Bowen received the monthly Player of the Month award. On 8 June 2019, Adkins confirmed his decision not to renew his expiring contract, stating that his and the club's futures were "not aligned".

=== Charlton Athletic ===
On 18 March 2021, Adkins was appointed as manager of Charlton Athletic signing a two-and-a-half-year deal.

On 21 October 2021, Adkins left Charlton Athletic following a poor start to the 2021–22 season which saw the club slip to its lowest ever league position.

=== Tranmere Rovers ===
On 7 May 2023, Adkins returned to Tranmere Rovers as technical director, mentor and advisor to manager Ian Dawes. On 10 September 2023 Adkins was appointed interim manager following Dawes' sacking. He was appointed permanent manager on 2 November 2023, signing a contract until the end of 2025–26 season. On 26 February 2025, Adkins left Tranmere by mutual agreement. This decision came after a ten-game winless run in the league which culminated in a home defeat to Accrington Stanley which left Tranmere two points above the relegation zone. Adkins won 23 of his 72 games in charge at Tranmere.

== Managerial style ==
Adkins had been praised by former players for his man-management, and for his ability to instil belief in his players and generate confidence within his squads.

== Personal life ==
Adkins and his wife, Angie, have two children.

== Managerial statistics ==
As of match played 25 February 2025

Managerial record by team and tenure
Team	From	To	Record					Ref.
Team	From	To	P	W	D	L	Win %	Ref.
Bangor City	1 June 1993	4 February 1996	134	75	25	34	55.97	
Scunthorpe United	6 November 2006	12 September 2010	199	83	44	72	41.71	
Southampton	12 September 2010	18 January 2013	124	68	25	31	54.84	
Reading	26 March 2013	15 December 2014	80	29	20	31	36.25	
Sheffield United	2 June 2015	12 May 2016	54	22	14	18	40.74	
Hull City	7 December 2017	30 June 2019	78	26	21	31	33.33	
Charlton Athletic	18 March 2021	21 October 2021	26	9	7	10	34.62	
Tranmere Rovers	10 September 2023	25 February 2025	72	23	16	33	31.94	
Total			777	336	173	268	43.24	

== Honours ==
=== Player-manager ===
Bangor City

- League of Wales: 1993–94, 1994–95
- Welsh League Cup runner-up: 1993–94

=== Manager ===
Scunthorpe United

- Football League One: 2006–07; play-offs: 2009
- Football League Trophy runner-up: 2008–09

Southampton

- Football League Championship runner-up: 2011–12
- Football League One runner-up: 2010–11

Individual

- League of Wales Manager of the Season: 1993–94, 1994–95
- Football League One Manager of the Month: February 2007, April 2011, December 2015
- Member of the Welsh Premier League Hall of Fame
