= 1993–94 League of Wales =

League of Wales
- Season: 1993–94
- Champions: Bangor City
- Relegated: Haverfordwest County; Briton Ferry Athletic
- UEFA Cup: Bangor City; Inter Cardiff
- Matches played: 380
- Goals scored: 1,225 (3.22 per match)
- Top goalscorer: David Taylor (43)

The 1993–94 League of Wales was the second season of the League of Wales after its establishment in 1992. The league was won by Bangor City.

== Teams ==
Location of clubs in 1993–94 League of Wales

| Club | Ground | Manager | Captain | Previous league | Pos. |
|---|---|---|---|---|---|
| Aberystwyth Town | Park Avenue | | | League of Wales | 3rd |
| Afan Lido | Afan Lido Sports Ground | | | League of Wales | 12th |
| Bangor City | Farrar Road Stadium | | | League of Wales | 5th |
| Briton Ferry Athletic | Old Road Stadium | | | League of Wales | 17th |
| Caersws | Recreation Ground | | | League of Wales | 11th |
| Connah's Quay Nomads | Deeside Stadium | | | League of Wales | 8th |
| Conwy United | Y Morfa | | | League of Wales | 7th |
| Cwmbran Town | Cwmbran Stadium | | | League of Wales | 1st |
| Ebbw Vale | Eugene Cross Park | | | League of Wales | 4th |
| Flint Town United | Cae-y-Castell | | | League of Wales | 16th |
| Inter Cardiff | Cardiff Athletics Stadium | | | League of Wales | 2nd |
| Haverfordwest County | Bridge Meadow Stadium | | | League of Wales | 10th |
| Holywell Town | Halkyn Road | | | League of Wales | 6th |
| Llanelli | Stebonheath Park | | | League of Wales | 14th |
| Llansantffraid | Recreation Ground | | | Cymru Alliance | 1st |
| Mold Alexandra | Alyn Park | | | League of Wales | 13th |
| Maesteg Park | Tudor Park | | | League of Wales | 15th |
| Newtown | Latham Park | | | League of Wales | 18th |
| Porthmadog | Y Traeth | | | League of Wales | 9th |
| Ton Pentre | Ynys Park | | | Welsh Football League | 1st |

== League table ==
| Pos | Team | Pld | W | D | L | GF | GA | GD | Pts | Qualification or relegation |
|---|---|---|---|---|---|---|---|---|---|---|
| 1 | Bangor City (C) | 38 | 26 | 5 | 7 | 82 | 26 | +56 | 83 | Qualification for UEFA Cup preliminary round |
| 2 | Inter Cardiff | 38 | 26 | 3 | 9 | 95 | 44 | +51 | 81 | Qualification for UEFA Cup preliminary round |
| 3 | Ton Pentre | 38 | 21 | 8 | 9 | 62 | 40 | +22 | 71 | |
| 4 | Flint Town United | 38 | 20 | 6 | 12 | 70 | 47 | +23 | 66 | |
| 5 | Holywell Town | 38 | 18 | 10 | 10 | 75 | 57 | +18 | 64 | |
| 6 | Newtown | 38 | 18 | 9 | 11 | 52 | 48 | +4 | 63 | |
| 7 | Connah's Quay Nomads | 38 | 15 | 12 | 11 | 57 | 47 | +10 | 57 | |
| 8 | Cwmbran Town | 38 | 16 | 9 | 13 | 51 | 46 | +5 | 57 | |
| 9 | Ebbw Vale | 38 | 16 | 9 | 13 | 68 | 66 | +2 | 57 | |
| 10 | Aberystwyth Town | 38 | 15 | 10 | 13 | 57 | 55 | +2 | 55 | |
| 11 | Porthmadog | 38 | 14 | 7 | 17 | 90 | 71 | +19 | 49 | |
| 12 | Llanelli | 38 | 14 | 4 | 20 | 76 | 100 | −24 | 46 | |
| 13 | Conwy United | 38 | 13 | 6 | 19 | 58 | 70 | −12 | 45 | |
| 14 | Mold Alexandra | 38 | 12 | 7 | 19 | 59 | 75 | −16 | 43 | |
| 15 | Afan Lido | 38 | 8 | 16 | 14 | 52 | 64 | −12 | 40 | |
| 16 | Haverfordwest County (R) | 38 | 10 | 10 | 18 | 40 | 81 | −41 | 40 | Resigned for Welsh Division One |
| 17 | Caersws | 38 | 9 | 12 | 17 | 39 | 56 | −17 | 39 | |
| 18 | Llansantffraid | 38 | 9 | 7 | 22 | 46 | 77 | −31 | 34 | |
| 19 | Maesteg Park | 38 | 8 | 9 | 21 | 43 | 71 | −28 | 33 | |
| 20 | Briton Ferry Athletic (R) | 38 | 8 | 9 | 21 | 53 | 84 | −31 | 33 | Relegated to Welsh Division One |

Rules for classification: 1) points; 2) goal difference; 3) number of goals scored.
(C) Champions; (R) Relegated

== Results ==
| Home \ Away | ABE | AFA | BAN | BRI | CWS | CQN | CON | CWM | EBB | FTU | HAV | HOL | INC | LLA | LSF | MAE | MOL | NTW | POR | TON |
|---|---|---|---|---|---|---|---|---|---|---|---|---|---|---|---|---|---|---|---|---|
| Aberystwyth Town | | 2–2 | 0–2 | 0–0 | 1–0 | 0–0 | 0–1 | 0–3 | 1–1 | 2–0 | 0–3 | 5–2 | 2–4 | 1–0 | 1–0 | 1–1 | 3–1 | 3–0 | 4–3 | 0–0 |
| Afan Lido | 2–4 | | 2–3 | 1–3 | 0–0 | 0–1 | 2–2 | 1–1 | 1–1 | 1–1 | 3–3 | 0–2 | 1–3 | 2–2 | 3–0 | 1–0 | 1–2 | 3–1 | 2–2 | 3–1 |
| Bangor City | 1–1 | 2–1 | | 2–0 | 1–1 | 2–0 | 2–1 | 2–1 | 1–0 | 1–0 | 9–0 | 2–1 | 1–1 | 5–1 | 8–0 | 6–1 | 3–0 | 0–0 | 2–1 | 1–0 |
| Briton Ferry Athletic | 2–2 | 0–3 | 0–4 | | 1–0 | 2–2 | 2–4 | 1–1 | 2–1 | 3–3 | 3–1 | 2–4 | 2–9 | 2–3 | 2–3 | 3–0 | 1–2 | 1–3 | 3–6 | 0–1 |
| Caersws | 4–1 | 2–0 | 0–4 | 1–1 | | 0–0 | 3–2 | 1–1 | 3–0 | 0–1 | 0–1 | 2–1 | 1–2 | 3–3 | 2–3 | 1–0 | 0–2 | 0–1 | 0–2 | 0–3 |
| Connah's Quay Nomads | 2–0 | 1–1 | 2–0 | 2–2 | 1–1 | | 5–1 | 2–0 | 2–3 | 2–1 | 2–3 | 1–1 | 0–3 | 5–1 | 3–2 | 3–1 | 1–1 | 0–2 | 1–0 | 0–1 |
| Conwy United | 2–3 | 2–3 | 1–0 | 5–3 | 0–1 | 1–0 | | 1–1 | 4–2 | 0–1 | 4–1 | 0–1 | 2–1 | 0–1 | 2–1 | 1–1 | 2–3 | 1–1 | 1–4 | 0–1 |
| Cwmbran Town | 1–1 | 1–0 | 1–0 | 3–1 | 4–1 | 1–0 | 0–2 | | 2–2 | 3–2 | 0–3 | 1–1 | 1–1 | 3–1 | 2–1 | 1–1 | 4–0 | 1–0 | 0–1 | 2–1 |
| Ebbw Vale | 1–1 | 3–1 | 0–2 | 3–0 | 3–2 | 1–2 | 2–1 | 1–0 | | 2–1 | 1–2 | 1–0 | 3–5 | 1–3 | 2–2 | 3–3 | 5–3 | 0–2 | 4–3 | 1–1 |
| Flint Town United | 0–3 | 5–0 | 1–0 | 0–1 | 0–0 | 2–1 | 3–3 | 2–1 | 2–1 | | 4–0 | 3–1 | 4–0 | 3–1 | 1–1 | 0–3 | 2–0 | 4–1 | 3–1 | 3–1 |
| Haverfordwest County | 2–3 | 0–0 | 0–3 | 0–0 | 0–1 | 0–0 | 0–2 | 1–5 | 1–1 | 1–2 | | 3–3 | 1–0 | 1–3 | 3–1 | 1–3 | 2–1 | 1–4 | 0–9 | 0–2 |
| Holywell Town | 3–1 | 4–0 | 3–0 | 1–3 | 1–1 | 1–1 | 3–1 | 3–1 | 4–2 | 2–2 | 4–0 | | 1–0 | 6–1 | 0–0 | 2–1 | 1–0 | 2–2 | 3–2 | 4–1 |
| Inter Cardiff | 1–0 | 0–2 | 1–0 | 2–0 | 4–1 | 3–1 | 2–1 | 3–0 | 1–2 | 2–1 | 1–1 | 4–1 | | 5–1 | 2–1 | 3–0 | 3–0 | 1–0 | 5–4 | 1–3 |
| Llanelli | 2–1 | 2–3 | 0–3 | 1–3 | 2–2 | 2–3 | 6–1 | 5–0 | 5–3 | 1–2 | 0–2 | 1–3 | 1–10 | | 4–2 | 2–1 | 4–1 | 1–2 | 2–4 | 3–0 |
| Llansantffraid | 1–2 | 1–1 | 1–2 | 3–1 | 1–1 | 2–2 | 3–0 | 1–0 | 0–2 | 1–0 | 1–2 | 2–0 | 0–1 | 4–0 | | 2–1 | 0–5 | 1–3 | 1–5 | 1–4 |
| Maesteg Park | 1–2 | 1–1 | 0–3 | 1–0 | 2–2 | 0–2 | 1–2 | 0–1 | 1–2 | 0–3 | 0–0 | 2–4 | 0–4 | 1–2 | 1–0 | | 2–4 | 3–2 | 1–1 | 0–1 |
| Mold Alexandra | 1–3 | 2–2 | 0–1 | 3–1 | 1–2 | 2–4 | 1–1 | 1–2 | 0–2 | 1–4 | 1–0 | 1–1 | 3–2 | 1–1 | 2–1 | 4–5 | | 0–0 | 4–0 | 1–4 |
| Newtown | 2–1 | 0–0 | 1–1 | 2–1 | 1–0 | 1–2 | 2–0 | 1–0 | 0–3 | 3–2 | 0–0 | 1–0 | 0–3 | 3–1 | 3–2 | 0–0 | 2–3 | | 5–2 | 0–0 |
| Porthmadog | 2–1 | 2–2 | 0–2 | 1–1 | 2–0 | 1–1 | 0–1 | 1–0 | 1–2 | 0–2 | 5–1 | 7–1 | 1–2 | 5–6 | 4–0 | 0–2 | 1–1 | 0–1 | | 5–2 |
| Ton Pentre | 2–1 | 2–1 | 3–1 | 1–0 | 3–0 | 2–0 | 4–3 | 0–2 | 1–1 | 3–0 | 0–0 | 0–0 | 1–0 | 3–1 | 0–0 | 1–2 | 2–1 | 5–0 | 2–2 | |

Legend: Blue = home team win; Yellow = draw; Red = away team win.
