= Inter Cardiff F.C. =

Association football club in Wales

Inter Cardiff
- Full name: Inter Cardiff Football Club
- Nicknames: The Div's, The Gulls
- Founded: 1990
- Dissolved: 2000 (merged with Cardiff Met)
- Owner: CableTel (1996–99)
Home colours

Inter Cardiff F.C. was a Welsh football club based in Leckwith, Cardiff that played in the League of Wales. Founded as Inter Cardiff in 1990, by the merger of A.F.C. Cardiff and Sully F.C, the club changed its name to Inter CableTel in 1996 before reverting to their original name three years later.

== History ==
The club has had a chequered history, and has experienced turbulent times and many name changes.

=== Formative years ===
The club was formed by a series of mergers and name changes. Firstly, Lake United renamed themselves A.F.C. Cardiff in 1984. In 1990, they merged with Sully F.C to form Inter Cardiff FC. In 1996, the club was renamed Inter CableTel A.F.C. (after their sponsors), but reverted to Inter Cardiff FC in 1999.

=== A new adventure ===
Meanwhile, the team of Cardiff College of Education was developing (now Cardiff Metropolitan University). The team went through a series of name changes, mirroring the name changes of the institution it represented. The team was originally known as Cardiff College of Education F.C.. They became South Glamorgan Institute F.C. in 1979; Cardiff Institute of Higher Education F.C. in 1990 and UWIC in 1996.

=== Inter CableTel ===
In 2000, Inter Cardiff merged with Cardiff Metropolitan University (UWIC) to form UWIC Inter Cardiff F.C.. The team's nicknames by fans included The International, The Sheep (Wales is famous for its sheep) or The Divs (from Car-DIFF). The Seagull on the team's logo originated from the Sully connection (nicknamed 'The Seagulls'). They changed their name again in the summer of 2012 to Cardiff Metropolitan University F.C.

=== Final year ===
Following their best season ever the future of the team was left in doubt after their major sponsor CableTel, now operating as ntl, withdrew their sponsorship. Despite their entry into European competition in the 1999–2000 UEFA Cup they finished the season one place above relegation and lost their hold on the Welsh Cup in the Fourth Round.

Following a poor season it was decided to merge with the University of Wales Institute, Cardiff's men's football team, or UWIC for short, and form a new club, UWIC Inter Cardiff A.F.C. The Inter Cardiff name continued until the 2008–09 season before it was dropped, leaving the team to continue from 2009 to 2010 as U.W.I.C. The Institute itself underwent a name change in 2012, and following suit, so did the team, becoming Cardiff Metropolitan University F.C.

=== League and cup history ===
| Season | League contested | Level | Pld | W | D | L | GF | GA | GD | Pts | League position | Avg. home attendance^{1} | Welsh Cup | Welsh League Cup | Leading scorer^{1} |
|---|---|---|---|---|---|---|---|---|---|---|---|---|---|---|---|
| 1990–91 | Welsh Football League; National Division | n/a | 30 | 12 | 8 | 10 | 58 | 46 | +12 | 44 | 6th of 16 | ?? | R2 | n/a | unknown ?? |
| 1991–92 | Welsh Football League; National Division | n/a | 30 | 7 | 8 | 15 | 32 | 45 | −13 | 29 | 12th of 16 | ?? | R1 | n/a | unknown ?? |
| 1992–93 | League of Wales | 1 | 38 | 26 | 7 | 7 | 79 | 36 | +43 | 83 | 2nd of 20 | ?? | R3 | n/a | unknown ?? |
| 1993–94 | League of Wales | 1 | 38 | 26 | 3 | 9 | 97 | 44 | +53 | 81 | 2nd of 20 | ?? | QF | n/a | unknown ?? |
| 1994–95 | League of Wales | 1 | 38 | 14 | 11 | 13 | 58 | 43 | +15 | 53 | 10th of 20 | ?? | SF | n/a | unknown ?? |
| 1995–96 | League of Wales | 1 | 40 | 14 | 12 | 14 | 62 | 62 | 0 | 54 | 8th of 21 | ?? | R3 | n/a | unknown ?? |
| 1996–97 | League of Wales | 1 | 40 | 26 | 6 | 8 | 80 | 32 | +48 | 84 | 2nd of 21 | ?? | R3 | n/a | unknown ?? |
| 1997–98 | League of Wales | 1 | 38 | 25 | 3 | 10 | 58 | 28 | +30 | 74 | 4th of 20 | ?? | R4 | n/a | unknown ?? |
| 1998–99 | League of Wales | 1 | 32 | 19 | 6 | 7 | 61 | 26 | +35 | 63 | 2nd of 17 | ?? | Winners | n/a | unknown ?? |
| 1999–2000 | League of Wales | 1 | 34 | 8 | 6 | 20 | 30 | 62 | −32 | 29^{2} | 16th of 18 | ?? | R4 | n/a | unknown ?? |

^{1}: League games only
^{2}One point deducted for non-fulfilment of fixture.
Last updated: 13 January 2015

Q = Qualifying Round; R = Round Proper; P = Position; Pld = Matches played; W = Matches won; D = Matches drawn; L = Matches lost; GF = Goals for; GA = Goals against; GD = Goal difference; Pts = Points

== Honours ==
=== League ===
- League of Wales^{[a]}
  - Runners-up: 1992–93^{[b]}, 1993–94^{[b]}, 1996–97^{[b]}, 1998–99^{[b]}
- Welsh Football League Division Three
  - Champions (2012/13)

=== Cups ===
- Welsh Senior Cup
  - Champions: 1999^{[b]}
- Welsh Football League Cup
  - Champions: 1997

=== As Lake United ===
==== League ====
- Welsh Football League Division One
  - Champions: 1980–81
- Welsh Football League Division Two
  - Champions: 1979–80
- Welsh Women's Cup runners up: 1993 (as Inter Cardiff Ladies)
- Welsh Women's Cup runners up: 1994 (as Inter Cardiff Ladies)
- Welsh Women's Cup: 1995 (as Inter Cardiff Ladies)

They qualified for the 1999–2000 FAW Premier Cup but failed to progress from the group stage.

== European record ==
Inter Cardiff represented Wales three times in the UEFA Cup. In the 1994–95 tournament they lost 0–8 over two legs to Katowice of Poland in the preliminary round. They also played Scottish giants Celtic F.C. in the 1997–98 season (when known as Inter Cable Tel), losing 8–0 over the two legs. In 1999–2000 they lost 1–2 to Gorica of Slovenia over two legs in the 1st qualifying round.

All results (home and away) list Cardiff's goal tally first.

Updated 4 July 2019

| Season | Competition | Round | Club | Home | Away | Agg. |
|---|---|---|---|---|---|---|
| 1994–95 | UEFA Cup | PR | (Poland) GKS Katowice | 0–2 | 0–6 | 0–8 |
| 1997–98 | UEFA Cup | 1QR | (Scotland) Celtic | 0–3 | 0–5 | 0–8 |
| 1999–2000 | UEFA Cup | QR | (Slovenia) Gorica | 1–0 | 0–2 | 1–2 |

Notes

- PR: Preliminary round
- 1QR: First qualifying round
- QR: Qualifying round
