= 1995–96 Cymru Alliance =

Cymru Alliance
- Season: 1995–96
- Champions: Oswestry Town

The 1995–96 Cymru Alliance was the sixth season of the Cymru Alliance after its establishment in 1990. The league was won by Oswestry Town.

== League table ==
Pos	Team	Pld	W	D	L	GF	GA	GD	Pts	Promotion
1	Oswestry Town (C)	36	25	3	8	84	41	+43	78	
2	Welshpool Town (P)	36	23	7	6	83	40	+43	76	Promotion to League of Wales
3	Brymbo Broughton	36	23	4	9	81	57	+24	73	
4	Llandudno	36	21	9	6	94	42	+52	72	
5	Rhydymwyn	36	21	8	7	73	40	+33	71	
6	Rhayader Town	36	20	5	11	66	44	+22	65	
7	Penrhyncoch	35	18	10	7	74	45	+29	64 (Note: Incomplete fixtures)	
8	Cefn Druids	36	19	4	13	82	57	+25	61	
9	Lex XI	36	18	4	14	67	49	+18	58	
10	Penycae	36	13	8	15	58	71	−13	47	
11	Llandrindod Wells	36	11	11	14	50	58	−8	44	
12	Mostyn Town	36	13	4	19	78	78	0	43	
13	Rhos Aelwyd	35	10	5	20	47	74	−27	35	
14	Knighton Town	36	11	2	23	52	83	−31	35	
15	Mold Alexandra	36	10	6	20	61	90	−29	36	
16	Ruthin Town	36	9	6	21	42	71	−29	33	
17	Llanidloes Town	36	8	5	23	34	70	−36	29	
18	Buckley Town	36	7	6	23	38	107	−69	27	
19	Carno	36	6	3	27	42	89	−47	21	

Source: Cymru Alliance
Rules for classification: 1) points; 2) goal difference; 3) number of goals scored.
(C) Champions; (P) Promoted
