= 1914–15 Newport County A.F.C. season =

Welsh association football club season

Newport County
1914–15 season
- Manager: Sam Hollis
- Stadium: Somerton Park
- Southern League Second Division: 10th
- FA Cup: 4th qualifying round
- Welsh Cup: Scratched
- Top goalscorer: E.Hammett (7)
Home colours	Away colours

The 1914–15 season was Newport County's third consecutive season in the Southern League and third season in the club’s history.

== Season review ==
=== League ===
==== Results summary ====
Note: Two points for a win.

Overall								Home						Away					
Pld	W	D	L	GF	GA	Ave	Pts	W	D	L	GF	GA	Ave	W	D	L	GF	GA	Ave
24	7	3	14	27	42	0.64	17	7	1	4	19	7	2.71	0	2	10	8	35	0.23

Last updated: 24 Apr 1915.
Source: []

== Fixtures and results ==
=== Southern League Second Division ===
Date	Opponents	Venue	Result	Scorers	Attendance
5 Sep 1914	Stalybridge Celtic	H	0–1		2,000
19 Sep 1914	Merthyr Town	H	1–0	Hammett	
22 Sep 1914	Ebbw Vale	A	2–3	Flanders 2	
3 Oct 1914	Llanelly	H	2–0	Jarvis, Hammett	
17 Oct 1914	Mid Rhondda	A	0–0		
31 Oct 1914	Pontypridd	A	1–1	Evans	
14 Nov 1914	Brentford	A	0–1		3,000
28 Nov 1914	Coventry City	A	1–10	Evans	4,000
5 Dec 1914	Stoke	H	0–1		
19 Dec 1914	Ton Pentre	H	1–2	Spittle	
2 Jan 1915	Stalybridge Celtic	A	0–1		
9 Jan 1915	Stoke	H	1–3	Flanders	
16 Jan 1915	Swansea Town	H	1–0	Groves	
23 Jan 1915	Merthyr Town	A	1–2	Messer	
30 Jan 1915	Ebbw Vale	H	3–0	Hammett 2, Jarvis	
6 Feb 1915	Llanelly	A	1–3	Preece	
13 Feb 1915	Barry	A	1–3	Hammett	
20 Feb 1915	Mid Rhondda	H	3–1	Spittle 2, Hammett	
6 Mar 1915	Pontypridd	H	1–1	Hammett	
13 Mar 1915	Swansea Town	A	0–2		4,000
20 Mar 1915	Brentford	H	5–0	Williams 3, Howells, Jarvis	
3 Apr 1915	Coventry City	H	0–1		
5 Apr 1915	Barry	H	2–0	Groves, Williams	
24 Apr 1915	Ton Pentre	A	0–6		

=== FA Cup ===
Round	Date	Opponents	Venue	Result	Scorers	Attendance
P	26 Sep 1914	Rhiwderin	H	8–0		
1Q	10 Oct 1914	Milford	H	6–0	Hammett 3, Evans 2, Edwards	
2Q	24 Oct 1914	Rhymney	H	3–1	Evans 2, Groves	
3Q	7 Nov 1914	Barry	H	4–2	Hammett 2, Evans, Groves	
4Q	21 Nov 1914	Swansea Town	A	0–1		5,000

=== Welsh Cup ===
Round	Date	Opponents	Venue	Result	Scorers	Attendance
1	22 Oct 1914	Abertillery	H	3–0	Groves, Williams, Johnson	3,000

== League table ==
Pos	Team	Pld	W	D	L	F	A	Pts
1	Stoke	24	17	4	3	62	15	38
2	Stalybridge Celtic	24	17	3	4	47	22	37
3	Merthyr Town	24	15	5	4	46	20	35
4	Swansea Town	24	16	1	7	48	21	33
5	Coventry City	24	13	2	9	56	33	28
6	Ton Pentre	24	11	6	7	42	43	28
7	Brentford	24	8	7	9	35	45	23
8	Llanelly	24	10	1	13	39	32	21
9	Barry	24	6	5	13	30	35	17
10	Newport County	24	7	3	14	27	42	17
11	Pontypridd	24	5	6	13	31	58	16
12	Mid Rhondda	24	3	6	15	17	49	12
13	Ebbw Vale	24	3	1	20	23	88	7
