= 1994–95 League of Wales =

League of Wales
- Season: 1994–95
- Champions: Bangor City
- Relegated: Mold Alexandra; Maesteg Park
- UEFA Cup: Bangor City; Afan Lido
- Intertoto Cup: Ton Pentre
- Matches played: 380
- Goals scored: 1,269 (3.34 per match)
- Top goalscorer: Frank Mottram (31)

The 1994–95 League of Wales was the third season of the League of Wales following its establishment in 1992. The league was won by Bangor City, their second title.

== League table ==
Pos	Team	Pld	W	D	L	GF	GA	GD	Pts	Qualification or relegation
1	Bangor City (C)	38	27	7	4	96	26	+70	88	Qualification for UEFA Cup preliminary round
2	Afan Lido	38	24	7	7	60	36	+24	79	Qualification for UEFA Cup preliminary round
3	Ton Pentre	38	23	8	7	84	50	+34	77	Qualification for Intertoto Cup group stage
4	Newtown	38	20	8	10	78	47	+31	68	
5	Cwmbran Town	38	20	7	11	69	49	+20	67	
6	Flint Town United	38	20	3	15	77	60	+17	63	
7	Barry Town	38	16	11	11	71	57	+14	59	
8	Holywell Town	38	16	10	12	62	55	+7	58	
9	Llansantffraid	38	15	10	13	57	57	0	55	
10	Inter Cardiff	38	14	11	13	58	43	+15	53	
11	Rhyl	38	16	5	17	74	69	+5	53	
12	Conwy United	38	14	7	17	60	65	−5	49	
13	Ebbw Vale	38	12	9	17	51	57	−6	45	
14	Caersws	38	11	11	16	57	64	−7	44	
15	Connah's Quay Nomads	38	12	7	19	57	79	−22	43	
16	Porthmadog	38	11	7	20	57	73	−16	40	
17	Aberystwyth Town	38	9	12	17	57	75	−18	39	
18	Llanelli	38	10	6	22	64	104	−40	36	
19	Mold Alexandra (R)	38	10	4	24	57	90	−33	34	Relegation to Cymru Alliance
20	Maesteg Park (R)	38	2	6	30	23	113	−90	12	Relegation to Welsh Division One

Rules for classification: 1) points; 2) goal difference; 3) number of goals scored.
(C) Champions; (R) Relegated

== Results ==
Home \ Away	ABE	AFA	BAN	BAR	CWS	CQN	CON	CWM	EBB	FTU	HOL	INC	LLA	LSF	MAE	MOL	NTW	POR	RHY	TON
Aberystwyth Town		1–1	1–2	2–2	1–1	1–2	1–1	0–2	4–1	1–3	1–1	1–1	2–2	1–2	2–0	1–0	2–2	5–1	1–4	3–1
Afan Lido	2–2		0–1	2–0	1–0	2–0	3–2	2–1	1–1	0–2	3–2	2–1	2–1	2–1	2–2	3–1	1–0	0–1	2–0	1–1
Bangor City	7–2	2–3		2–0	3–1	2–2	4–1	3–2	2–0	6–3	1–1	1–1	3–0	2–1	7–0	4–0	3–0	4–0	2–0	0–0
Barry Town	3–1	0–2	1–0		1–1	1–1	2–1	2–3	1–1	3–0	2–1	2–2	5–3	2–2	3–0	3–0	3–0	2–3	2–1	0–3
Caersws	2–1	0–1	0–5	0–3		2–2	4–1	2–2	2–4	2–3	1–1	0–0	0–2	0–1	2–0	5–2	0–0	0–1	3–1	2–1
Connah's Quay Nomads	3–2	1–2	0–8	2–2	2–1		0–0	0–1	1–0	2–1	2–2	0–1	1–2	1–2	1–0	1–3	1–4	4–1	0–4	2–1
Conwy United	3–2	1–0	1–4	3–1	0–3	4–5		0–1	3–0	4–1	0–1	1–1	0–0	2–0	3–0	3–3	4–2	1–0	1–2	2–4
Cwmbran Town	2–2	2–0	0–2	2–3	1–1	3–0	1–1		1–0	2–0	2–0	4–0	3–1	5–2	2–0	4–3	1–2	1–4	1–4	0–1
Ebbw Vale	2–2	0–3	2–2	2–2	0–3	2–0	3–2	0–0		1–2	1–0	1–0	1–2	2–0	3–0	6–1	0–2	1–0	1–3	2–3
Flint Town United	3–0	1–2	1–0	1–3	4–1	1–0	1–3	0–1	2–2		1–1	0–0	8–0	4–0	5–1	3–1	5–0	3–2	0–3	1–3
Holywell Town	1–2	1–2	0–2	1–0	2–0	2–0	2–0	1–4	1–0	2–3		1–1	4–2	0–2	2–0	3–1	1–0	5–2	3–3	3–3
Inter Cardiff	1–2	0–2	0–0	2–3	3–0	5–0	4–0	0–1	1–1	3–1	1–2		3–0	1–2	5–0	3–2	0–1	0–1	1–0	1–2
Llanelli	0–2	1–3	1–0	3–2	2–2	0–9	2–4	2–3	1–3	4–1	2–3	0–3		3–3	6–1	2–1	2–4	1–4	5–2	0–2
Llansantffraid	3–0	0–0	1–1	1–1	2–3	4–3	3–0	0–2	0–0	0–3	2–0	1–3	4–2		1–1	5–3	0–0	1–2	3–1	2–2
Maesteg Park	0–1	2–1	0–2	2–1	1–1	1–1	0–4	0–4	1–5	0–1	0–4	0–1	2–6	0–3		1–2	1–1	2–2	1–2	1–5
Mold Alexandra	4–2	1–2	1–2	0–2	2–1	1–3	0–2	3–1	2–1	0–2	2–3	1–2	5–1	0–0	2–0		0–2	1–1	1–2	3–7
Newtown	1–1	1–1	0–2	2–2	3–3	3–0	2–0	2–1	1–0	2–1	4–1	3–4	4–0	0–1	9–0	4–0		3–1	3–0	3–2
Porthmadog	4–0	1–2	0–1	1–4	1–3	2–0	0–1	2–2	0–1	1–4	1–1	1–1	1–1	0–1	5–0	1–2	0–4		2–2	2–3
Rhyl	3–2	0–1	0–1	3–1	4–3	2–3	1–1	1–1	3–0	1–2	1–2	3–1	2–2	3–1	3–1	1–2	3–2	3–4		3–6
Ton Pentre	2–0	2–1	0–3	1–1	0–2	4–2	2–0	3–0	3–1	3–0	1–1	1–1	2–0	2–0	3–2	1–1	0–2	3–2	1–0	

Legend: Blue = home team win; Yellow = draw; Red = away team win.
