= 1995–96 League of Wales =

League of Wales
- Season: 1995–96
- Champions: Barry Town
- Relegated: Afan Lido; Llanelli
- UEFA Cup: Barry Town; Newtown
- Cup Winners' Cup: Llansantffraid
- Intertoto Cup: Conwy United
- Matches played: 420
- Goals scored: 1,353 (3.22 per match)
- Top goalscorer: Ken McKenna (38)

The 1995–96 League of Wales was the fourth season of the League of Wales since its establishment in 1992. The league was won by Barry Town.

== League table ==
Pos	Team	Pld	W	D	L	GF	GA	GD	Pts	Qualification or relegation
1	Barry Town (C)	40	30	7	3	92	23	+69	97	Qualification for UEFA Cup preliminary round
2	Newtown	40	23	11	6	69	25	+44	80	Qualification for UEFA Cup preliminary round
3	Conwy United	40	21	13	6	101	58	+43	76	Qualification for Intertoto Cup group stage
4	Bangor City	40	21	6	13	72	65	+7	69	
5	Flint Town United	40	19	9	12	76	57	+19	66	
6	Caernarfon Town	40	16	13	11	77	59	+18	61	
7	Cwmbran Town	40	14	15	11	58	49	+9	57	
8	Caersws	40	15	10	15	81	95	−14	55	
9	Inter Cardiff	40	14	12	14	62	62	0	54	
10	Connah's Quay Nomads	40	13	14	13	68	63	+5	53	
11	Ebbw Vale	40	14	11	15	59	56	+3	53	
12	Llansantffraid	40	14	10	16	66	57	+9	52	Qualification for Cup Winners' Cup qualifying round
13	Porthmadog	40	13	11	16	56	62	−6	50	
14	Aberystwyth Town	40	13	9	18	60	68	−8	48	
15	Cemaes Bay	40	13	7	20	63	80	−17	46	
16	Holywell Town	40	12	7	21	53	74	−21	43	
17	Briton Ferry Athletic	40	11	9	20	64	91	−27	42	
18	Rhyl	40	11	9	20	47	83	−36	42	
19	Ton Pentre	40	8	16	16	46	65	−19	40	
20	Afan Lido (R)	40	9	9	22	33	71	−38	36	Relegation to Welsh Division One
21	Llanelli (R)	40	7	10	23	48	88	−40	31	Relegation to Welsh Division One

Rules for classification: 1) points; 2) goal difference; 3) number of goals scored.
(C) Champions; (R) Relegated

== Results ==
Home \ Away	ABE	AFA	BAN	BAR	BRI	CAE	CWS	CEM	CQN	CON	CWM	EBB	FTU	HOL	INC	LLA	LSF	NTW	POR	RHY	TON
Aberystwyth Town		1–1	2–1	0–1	3–1	3–3	1–1	1–3	1–0	2–0	1–1	1–1	2–4	1–2	1–0	2–2	2–2	1–4	4–1	1–2	2–0
Afan Lido	1–4		2–3	0–3	0–4	3–1	3–2	0–1	2–0	0–3	0–0	0–1	0–3	2–0	2–0	3–2	0–1	0–0	1–0	2–3	0–2
Bangor City	0–3	2–0		0–3	4–1	1–1	1–2	3–2	2–1	4–4	1–0	2–2	3–2	2–1	2–1	4–0	2–1	1–1	1–1	3–1	2–0
Barry Town	2–1	6–0	0–1		4–0	1–0	1–1	2–0	2–0	3–1	2–2	1–0	3–1	4–0	2–1	3–0	2–1	2–0	4–1	4–0	2–0
Briton Ferry Athletic	3–1	1–1	4–1	1–6		3–1	2–3	1–1	1–1	2–5	0–5	3–1	0–2	2–0	1–1	5–0	2–1	0–1	5–1	1–1	1–2
Caernarfon Town	2–1	1–0	1–2	0–2	1–1		2–0	1–0	1–4	2–2	3–1	0–0	1–1	1–1	3–1	4–0	3–3	0–1	2–2	8–1	2–0
Caersws	1–3	0–0	3–1	0–4	3–0	3–2		4–3	3–2	1–3	2–1	3–4	2–4	5–3	2–2	4–0	0–7	0–2	4–1	4–2	2–2
Cemaes Bay	2–2	2–2	3–2	2–1	5–1	0–4	2–2		7–1	0–2	1–1	2–1	3–0	4–1	1–2	2–0	0–0	2–4	2–1	2–1	3–0
Connah's Quay Nomads	1–0	4–0	1–2	0–0	8–3	4–1	6–3	3–3		2–4	5–1	1–1	0–3	1–4	3–1	3–1	0–0	0–2	1–1	2–1	1–1
Conwy United	5–2	5–0	4–0	0–2	1–1	1–1	7–3	3–0	2–2		2–3	4–0	2–1	1–1	1–0	2–0	2–2	1–1	1–0	7–2	2–2
Cwmbran Town	1–0	0–0	0–0	0–0	2–1	1–2	2–1	3–1	1–1	2–2		1–3	4–2	1–0	3–0	2–3	3–1	1–2	0–1	1–2	2–2
Ebbw Vale	1–2	2–2	1–2	0–1	4–1	3–2	3–3	3–0	1–1	3–3	0–1		1–0	4–1	1–1	0–1	0–1	1–3	1–2	3–1	3–0
Flint Town United	4–0	0–3	3–2	5–1	4–0	3–2	1–1	2–1	0–0	2–2	1–3	1–1		1–2	1–1	2–1	0–5	2–1	2–0	0–1	1–1
Holywell Town	2–1	2–0	0–1	0–2	2–2	1–2	3–4	2–1	1–3	1–1	2–0	3–1	3–5		2–3	4–2	2–1	0–3	1–0	0–1	1–1
Inter Cardiff	2–0	2–0	4–2	0–0	2–1	2–2	3–1	5–2	2–1	2–1	0–2	0–0	0–5	0–3		3–3	1–1	2–2	3–0	4–1	4–0
Llanelli	4–2	4–0	1–3	0–5	2–3	2–2	1–1	2–0	2–0	2–4	1–1	0–2	0–1	1–1	0–1		0–1	3–3	1–4	2–2	1–2
Llansantffraid	3–1	1–2	0–2	1–1	3–1	1–3	4–1	5–0	1–2	2–5	1–1	0–1	1–0	3–0	3–2	0–2		1–0	0–3	5–1	1–1
Newtown	1–1	1–0	2–1	0–0	3–0	0–0	4–0	3–0	0–0	3–0	0–0	1–2	0–2	2–0	2–0	2–0	3–0		0–1	2–0	3–0
Porthmadog	1–0	3–1	4–1	2–3	1–2	1–2	1–1	4–0	1–1	1–2	0–2	3–1	1–1	2–0	1–1	4–1	1–1	0–5		0–0	3–3
Rhyl	1–2	1–0	0–3	1–5	2–1	1–5	1–2	3–0	1–1	0–1	2–2	1–0	1–1	1–1	3–2	1–1	3–0	0–1	0–1		0–2
Ton Pentre	1–2	0–0	3–2	1–2	2–2	2–3	1–3	2–0	0–1	1–3	1–1	1–2	2–3	2–0	1–1	0–0	2–1	1–1	1–1	1–1	

Legend: Blue = home team win; Yellow = draw; Red = away team win.
