= 1998–99 League of Wales =

League of Wales
- Season: 1998–99
- Champions: Barry Town (4th title)
- Relegated: Holywell Town
- Champions League: Barry Town (First qualifying round)
- UEFA Cup: Inter Cardiff; Cwmbrân Town (qualifying round)
- Intertoto Cup: Aberystwyth Town (first round)
- Matches played: 272
- Goals scored: 834 (3.07 per match)
- Top goalscorer: Eifion Williams (28)
- Biggest home win: Barry Town 7–1 Rhayader Town (3 October 1998)
- Biggest away win: Rhyl 0–6 Barry Town (14 October 1998)

The 1998–99 League of Wales was the seventh season of the League of Wales, the top division of Welsh football. It began on 22 August 1998 and ended on 1 May 1999. The league was won for a record fourth consecutive season by Barry Town.

Just 17 clubs competed in the league this season, as the 18th club Ebbw Vale (who had finished third the previous season) were expelled from the league before the season began due to financial difficulties, and promptly went out of business.

== Teams ==
Location of clubs in 1998–99 League of Wales

Team	Home city	Home ground
Aberystwyth Town	Aberystwyth	Park Avenue
Afan Lido	Port Talbot	Lido Ground
Bangor City	Bangor	Farrar Road Stadium
Barry Town	Barry	Jenner Park
Caernarfon Town	Caernarfon	The Oval
Caersws	Caersws	Recreation Ground
Carmarthen Town	Carmarthen	Richmond Park
Conwy United	Conwy	Y Morfa
Cwmbrân Town	Cwmbrân	Cwmbrân Stadium
Gap Connah's Quay	Connah's Quay	Deeside Stadium
Haverfordwest County	Haverfordwest	Bridge Meadow Stadium
Holywell Town	Holywell	Halkyn Road
Inter Cardiff	Cardiff	Cyncoed Campus
Newtown	Newtown	Latham Park
Rhayader Town	Rhayader	The Weirglodd
Rhyl	Rhyl	Belle Vue
Total Network Solutions	Llansantffraid-ym-Mechain	Recreation Ground

=== Managerial changes ===
Team	Outgoing manager	Manner of departure	Date of vacancy	Replaced by	Date of appointment	Table
Carmarthen Town	John Mahoney	Resigned	30 November 1998	Tomi Morgan	12 December 1998	9th

== League table ==
Pos	Team	Pld	W	D	L	GF	GA	GD	Pts	Qualification or relegation
1	Barry Town (C)	32	23	7	2	82	23	+59	76	Qualification for Champions League first qualifying round
2	Inter Cardiff	32	19	6	7	61	26	+35	63	Qualification for UEFA Cup qualifying round
3	Cwmbran Town	32	17	6	9	73	44	+29	57	Qualification for UEFA Cup qualifying round
4	Aberystwyth Town	32	16	9	7	59	47	+12	57	Qualification for Intertoto Cup first round
5	Caernarfon Town	32	13	11	8	45	46	−1	50	
6	Newtown	32	13	10	9	45	35	+10	49	
7	Conwy United	32	14	7	11	54	49	+5	49	
8	Total Network Solutions	32	12	11	9	55	42	+13	47	
9	Carmarthen Town	32	13	8	11	46	46	0	47	
10	Caersws	32	12	8	12	49	55	−6	44	
11	Bangor City	32	11	6	15	44	49	−5	39	
12	Connah's Quay Nomads	32	10	8	14	43	46	−3	38	
13	Haverfordwest County	32	9	7	16	43	60	−17	34	
14	Afan Lido	32	7	10	15	28	46	−18	31	
15	Rhayader Town	32	5	11	16	29	54	−25	26	
16	Rhyl	32	7	2	23	40	80	−40	23	
17	Holywell Town (R)	32	3	9	20	38	86	−48	18	Relegation to Cymru Alliance

Rules for classification: 1) points; 2) goal difference; 3) number of goals scored.
(C) Champions; (R) Relegated

== Results ==
Home \ Away	ABE	AFA	BAN	BAR	CNR	CSW	CMR	CON	CMT	CQN	HAV	HWL	INC	NEW	RHA	RHL	TNS
Aberystwyth Town		2–1	3–0	1–1	1–1	0–5	3–2	3–0	1–3	2–1	2–1	0–0	1–1	5–0	2–1	2–1	0–1
Afan Lido	2–2		0–2	0–0	1–3	0–1	1–1	0–1	0–4	1–3	0–2	2–0	0–2	0–2	2–0	2–1	3–3
Bangor City	1–2	0–1		0–3	1–1	0–1	4–0	1–3	2–2	0–2	3–0	5–2	1–0	2–3	0–1	4–1	2–1
Barry Town	5–1	0–2	4–2		3–0	5–2	6–2	1–1	2–1	1–0	2–0	4–0	1–1	1–0	7–1	2–0	2–0
Caernarfon Town	2–0	2–0	1–0	0–4		2–2	3–2	1–1	2–4	1–1	2–0	2–2	1–1	3–1	2–0	3–0	2–1
Caersws	2–3	2–1	2–4	3–2	1–2		0–3	1–3	2–0	4–4	3–2	0–2	1–1	0–0	3–1	3–1	2–0
Carmarthen Town	2–5	1–1	1–2	2–1	0–0	0–1		2–1	1–1	6–2	3–1	3–0	0–1	1–0	1–1	1–2	1–0
Conwy United	1–1	2–0	3–1	1–3	1–1	2–1	1–2		2–4	1–3	0–2	2–1	3–0	1–0	1–1	2–1	3–3
Cwmbran Town	0–1	1–4	2–4	0–4	6–0	2–1	2–0	3–0		2–1	4–0	4–0	0–0	3–0	3–6	6–1	0–4
Connah's Quay Nomads	0–0	0–0	1–1	0–3	2–2	0–0	0–2	1–2	1–0		3–1	4–2	1–2	3–2	4–1	6–2	2–3
Haverfordwest County	2–6	1–1	0–0	0–0	0–2	1–1	1–2	1–3	2–1	1–0		7–2	0–1	2–0	1–0	5–2	1–3
Holywell Town	3–6	0–0	1–1	2–3	1–2	0–0	1–1	4–3	0–4	0–0	4–0		1–2	0–3	2–2	0–3	3–3
Inter Cardiff	6–1	0–1	3–0	1–2	3–0	6–0	1–2	3–0	0–1	1–1	1–0	5–1		0–2	1–0	3–2	1–1
Newtown	1–1	4–0	3–1	0–0	1–1	4–0	0–0	2–1	0–0	1–0	1–1	4–0	1–3		1–0	2–1	0–0
Rhayader Town	0–2	1–1	0–0	0–0	2–0	1–3	1–0	2–2	1–1	2–0	2–2	1–3	0–5	0–2		1–2	0–0
Rhyl	1–0	2–0	1–2	0–6	0–1	1–1	1–2	0–3	1–4	1–2	1–2	5–1	1–2	3–3	3–1		0–3
Total Network Solutions	0–0	1–1	1–2	1–2	2–0	2–1	1–1	1–4	2–2	2–0	4–2	2–0	1–3	1–1	1–0	6–0	

Legend: Blue = home team win; Yellow = draw; Red = away team win.

== Top goalscorers ==
Pos	Player	Club	Goals
1	Eifion Williams	Barry Town	28
2	Chris Summers	Cwmbrân Town	21
3	Mattie Davies	Cwmbrân Town	20
3	John Toner	Conwy United	20
4	Richard Gay	Haverfordwest County	16
4	Jamie Hughes	Gap Connah's Quay	16
5	Richard Jones	Barry Town	14

== See also ==
- 1998–99 in Welsh football
- 1998–99 Welsh Cup
- 1998–99 Welsh League Cup
- 1998–99 FAW Premier Cup
