= 1996–97 League of Wales =

League of Wales
- Season: 1996–97
- Champions: Barry Town
- Relegated: Ton Pentre; Holywell Town; Briton Ferry Athletic
- Champions League: Barry Town
- UEFA Cup: Inter Cardiff
- Cup Winners' Cup: Cwmbran Town
- Intertoto Cup: Ebbw Vale
- Matches played: 420
- Goals scored: 1,396 (3.32 per match)
- Top goalscorer: Tony Bird (42)

The 1996–97 League of Wales was the fifth season of the League of Wales since its establishment in 1992. The league was won for the second consecutive season by Barry Town, who accrued a record total of 105 points. Their total of 129 goals scored was also a record until they broke it by five goals the following year.

For the first time, the League champions competed in the subsequent Champions League.

== League table ==
Pos	Team	Pld	W	D	L	GF	GA	GD	Pts	Qualification or relegation
1	Barry Town (C)	40	33	6	1	129	26	+103	105	Qualification for Champions League first qualifying round
2	Inter Cardiff	40	26	6	8	80	32	+48	84	Qualification for UEFA Cup first qualifying round
3	Ebbw Vale	40	23	9	8	87	40	+47	78	Qualification for Intertoto Cup group stage
4	Caernarfon Town	40	23	9	8	81	58	+23	78	
5	Newtown	40	22	5	13	74	49	+25	71	
6	TNS Llansantffraid	40	19	12	9	78	54	+24	69	
7	Conwy United	40	20	8	12	66	44	+22	68	
8	Bangor City	40	20	5	15	82	62	+20	65	
9	Cwmbran Town	40	19	8	13	71	61	+10	65	Qualification for Cup Winners' Cup qualifying round (Note: As 1996–97 Welsh Cup runners-up)
10	Porthmadog	40	18	8	14	64	60	+4	62	
11	Connah's Quay Nomads	40	16	9	15	62	64	−2	57	
12	Cemaes Bay	40	13	10	17	62	72	−10	49	
13	Aberystwyth Town	40	13	8	19	67	82	−15	47	
14	Caersws	40	11	9	20	53	77	−24	42	
15	Flint Town United	40	11	8	21	48	76	−28	41	
16	Carmarthen Town	40	11	7	22	41	79	−38	40	
17	Welshpool Town	40	10	9	21	50	80	−30	39	
18	Ton Pentre (R)	40	12	3	25	59	99	−40	39	Relegation to Welsh Division One (Note: Although they finished outside the relegation zone, Ton Pentre resigned from the League of Wales to play in Division 2 South)
19	Rhyl	40	10	8	22	51	71	−20	38	
20	Holywell Town (R)	40	7	8	25	52	81	−29	29	Relegation to Cymru Alliance
21	Briton Ferry Athletic (R)	40	5	1	34	39	129	−90	16	Relegation to Welsh Division One

Rules for classification: 1) points; 2) goal difference; 3) number of goals scored.
(C) Champions; (R) Relegated

== Results ==
Home \ Away	ABE	BAN	BAR	BRI	CAE	CWS	CMR	CEM	CQN	CON	CWM	EBB	FTU	HOL	INC	NTW	POR	RHY	TNS	TON	WEL
Aberystwyth Town		1–2	1–4	3–1	4–5	1–2	2–0	6–2	3–3	0–1	4–1	2–3	2–0	1–2	0–1	1–0	3–0	2–1	1–2	2–3	2–2
Bangor City	5–1		0–4	1–0	0–2	2–1	0–0	3–1	1–1	1–2	0–1	4–2	3–1	2–1	2–1	2–1	0–0	3–0	0–2	8–1	4–0
Barry Town	8–1	0–0		4–0	5–2	4–0	6–0	4–3	2–0	5–0	3–0	7–3	2–0	1–0	3–0	3–1	1–0	6–1	3–3	7–1	4–0
Briton Ferry Athletic	1–3	3–2	0–4		2–5	2–2	0–2	2–1	0–1	2–4	1–4	0–2	3–1	4–3	1–4	2–5	1–2	0–3	1–8	0–2	1–2
Caernarfon Town	2–2	1–4	1–3	6–2		3–2	2–1	1–1	3–1	3–3	2–3	1–0	0–0	3–0	0–1	3–0	2–1	1–0	2–1	1–0	2–1
Caersws	0–1	2–0	0–0	3–1	1–2		1–4	0–1	0–2	2–6	3–1	0–5	1–5	2–1	1–1	0–3	2–2	2–0	1–1	0–3	2–0
Carmarthen Town	0–4	1–5	1–1	2–0	1–3	2–3		2–4	1–0	0–2	2–3	0–2	1–0	1–0	1–1	0–3	0–2	2–1	0–0	0–4	2–3
Cemaes Bay	1–1	3–2	1–2	4–2	1–1	0–1	1–3		1–2	1–1	1–0	0–2	1–2	3–3	1–4	0–1	0–3	1–1	0–1	5–1	1–0
Connah's Quay Nomads	4–1	2–4	1–4	2–0	1–0	1–1	3–1	5–3		0–3	1–5	0–3	0–1	0–0	0–3	4–0	3–3	4–1	0–1	1–0	3–0
Conwy United	4–0	1–0	0–1	6–0	0–1	2–0	2–0	0–0	3–0		1–1	2–2	1–1	0–3	1–0	2–0	0–1	3–2	1–1	2–0	2–0
Cwmbran Town	6–0	1–3	0–4	2–3	1–1	2–1	2–2	2–2	0–1	3–1		0–1	1–2	2–1	2–1	1–3	2–1	4–4	3–1	3–1	2–1
Ebbw Vale	4–0	2–2	1–1	4–0	3–1	3–1	4–0	0–0	1–3	1–0	3–0		0–1	5–0	3–1	0–1	4–0	3–1	2–2	3–0	4–0
Flint Town United	0–1	3–4	0–8	3–1	0–3	1–1	4–0	1–3	0–2	0–1	2–4	0–1		2–1	0–2	1–3	2–3	3–2	1–1	2–1	1–1
Holywell Town	3–3	0–4	0–0	3–1	1–4	3–2	0–1	1–1	3–4	1–4	0–1	1–1	0–1		0–3	1–3	5–0	2–3	1–3	3–1	2–3
Inter Cardiff	1–0	4–1	1–2	7–0	6–1	3–0	1–0	2–1	0–0	3–0	1–1	2–1	2–1	2–0		1–0	1–0	2–1	1–1	3–0	3–4
Newtown	2–1	2–0	0–3	3–0	1–1	2–1	2–1	6–2	0–0	1–0	0–1	2–2	5–1	1–1	0–1		3–0	1–1	0–3	0–3	1–0
Porthmadog	2–2	2–0	1–4	2–0	0–0	1–3	0–0	2–4	2–0	3–1	2–1	1–1	3–0	4–1	0–2	0–4		6–0	4–1	2–1	1–2
Rhyl	0–2	1–2	1–2	4–0	1–1	1–1	4–0	0–1	3–1	1–1	0–0	0–2	1–1	0–2	1–0	3–1	0–1		1–3	2–1	0–1
TNS Llansantffraid	3–2	4–1	1–0	3–0	2–3	3–2	3–3	1–2	2–2	3–1	0–1	3–1	2–2	2–1	1–1	1–3	0–2	0–1		4–2	2–0
Ton Pentre	1–1	4–3	0–2	3–2	2–3	2–2	0–1	1–2	4–3	1–0	0–3	1–1	3–0	1–0	0–3	1–7	3–4	1–3	1–2		4–3
Welshpool Town	0–0	3–2	1–2	4–0	0–3	0–4	1–3	0–2	1–1	0–2	1–1	0–2	2–2	2–2	1–4	1–3	1–1	2–1	1–1	6–1	

Legend: Blue = home team win; Yellow = draw; Red = away team win.
