= 1992–93 League of Wales =

League of Wales
- Season: 1992–93
- Champions: Cwmbran Town (1st title)
- Relegated: Llanidloes Town; Abergavenny Thursdays
- Champions League: Cwmbran Town (preliminary round)
- Matches played: 380
- Goals scored: 1,232 (3.24 per match)
- Top goalscorer: Steve Woods (29)
- Biggest home win: Ebbw Vale 10–0 Briton Ferry Athletic (6 January 1993)
- Biggest away win: Bangor City 0–6 Holywell Town (31 October 1992); Abergavenny Thursdays 0–6 Afan Lido (16 January 1993); Llanidloes Town 0–6 Aberystwyth Town (24 April 1993)
- Highest scoring: Ebbw Vale 10–0 Briton Ferry Athletic (6 January 1993) (10 goals)

The 1992–93 League of Wales was the inaugural season of the League of Wales, the top division of Welsh football. The League was made up of 20 member clubs that joined from leagues within both the English football league system and Welsh football league system.

== Overview ==
=== Background ===
The new league was formed for the 1992–93 season. At the time, Wales was unusual in world football in that despite the Football Association of Wales (FAW) being a FIFA member and, along with the other three home nations (England, Northern Ireland and Scotland), holding a permanent seat on the International Football Association Board (IFAB), it did not organise a national league. With African and Asian nations feeling that the FAW were taking advantage of this fact, FAW Secretary General, Alun Evans announced in October 1991 that the new league would start at the beginning of the next season.

There were cross-regional leagues, such as the Cymru Alliance and the Welsh Football League along with the long established National competition, in the form of the Welsh Cup. However it was always felt that organising a national league would prove too difficult, due to the poor transport links between the North and South, combined with the fact that the larger clubs tended to ply their trade in the English football league system. At the time, Cardiff City, Swansea City and Wrexham were playing in The Football League, with Newport County having been relegated at the end of the 1987–88 season. The FAW decided to allow the remaining Football League teams to continue to play in the English system. Of the non-league clubs: Bangor City, Barry Town, Caernarfon Town, Colwyn Bay, Merthyr Tydfil, Newport, Newtown and Rhyl, the FAW gave them the ultimatum of joining the Welsh football league system or continue to play in the English system and be forced to play home games on English soil.

The 'Irate Eight', as they were dubbed by the Welsh press, appealed against this decision arguing that they should continue to play where they wished. However, with the exception of Merthyr Tydfil who were playing in the Football Conference, they were all told that they must join the new league. Of the eight only Bangor City, Newtown and Rhyl decided to join the new league, although Rhyl's application was late meaning they were forced to play in the Cymru Alliance, with the remaining five, dubbed 'The Exiles', would continue to play in the English system. Barry Town, who changed their name to Barri while ground-sharing with Worcester City at St George's Lane, continued to play in the Southern Football League Midland Division along with Newport who were ground-sharing with Gloucester City. Caernarfon Town and Colwyn Bay continued to play in the Northern Premier League, with Caernarfon Town ground-sharing with Curzon Ashton at their Tameside Stadium and Colwyn Bay doing the same with Northwich Victoria at the Drill Field.

As the new league was to top the Welsh football league system, the FAW sought re-organise the Welsh football pyramid, by placing the League of Wales at the top of the pyramid with the largest regional divisions, the Cymru Alliance and the Welsh Football League, being placed below this as feeder leagues. With this in mind the FAW sought to invite clubs from these leagues to become members of the League of Wales. Of the two leagues eight clubs left the Cymru Alliance with ten clubs leaving the Welsh Football League.

=== League members ===
Location of clubs in 1992–93 League of Wales

Club	Ground	Manager	Captain	Previous league	Pos.
Abergavenny Thursdays	Pen-y-Pound			Welsh Football League National Division	1st
Aberystwyth Town	Park Avenue	(Wales) Tomi Morgan		Welsh Football League National Division	3rd
Afan Lido	Afan Lido Sports Ground	(Wales) David Rees (Wales) Phil Robinson		Welsh Football League National Division	8th
Bangor City	Farrar Road Stadium	(Wales) Paul Rowlands		Northern Premier League Premier Division	20th
Briton Ferry Athletic	Old Road Stadium			Welsh Football League National Division	2nd
Caersws	Recreation Ground			Cymru Alliance	1st
Connah's Quay Nomads	Halfway Ground	(England) Ray Jones		Cymru Alliance	6th
Conwy United	Y Morfa			Cymru Alliance	5th
Cwmbran Town	Cwmbran Stadium			Welsh Football League National Division	7th
Ebbw Vale	Eugene Cross Park			Welsh Football League National Division	11th
Flint Town United	Cae-y-Castell			Cymru Alliance	4th
Inter Cardiff	Cardiff Athletics Stadium			Welsh Football League National Division	12th
Haverfordwest County	Bridge Meadow Stadium			Welsh Football League National Division	4th
Holywell Town	Halkyn Road			Cymru Alliance	11th
Llanelli	Stebonheath Park	(Wales) Alwyn Mainwaring		Welsh Football League National Division	10th
Llanidloes Town	Victoria Avenue			Cymru Alliance	12th
Mold Alexandra	Alyn Park			Cymru Alliance	10th
Maesteg Park	Tudor Park			Welsh Football League National Division	6th
Newtown	Latham Park	(Scotland) Brian Coyne		Northern Premier League Division One	14th
Porthmadog	Y Traeth			Cymru Alliance	3rd

== League table ==
Pos	Team	Pld	W	D	L	GF	GA	GD	Pts	Qualification or relegation
1	Cwmbran Town (C)	38	26	9	3	69	22	+47	87	Qualification for Champions League preliminary round
2	Inter Cardiff	38	26	5	7	79	36	+43	83	
3	Aberystwyth Town	38	25	3	10	85	48	+37	78	
4	Ebbw Vale	38	19	9	10	76	61	+15	66	
5	Bangor City	38	19	7	12	77	58	+19	64	
6	Holywell Town	38	17	8	13	65	48	+17	59	
7	Conwy United	38	16	9	13	51	51	0	57	
8	Connah's Quay Nomads	38	17	4	17	66	67	−1	55	
9	Porthmadog	38	14	11	13	61	49	+12	53	
10	Haverfordwest County	38	16	5	17	66	65	+1	53	
11	Caersws	38	14	10	14	63	60	+3	52	
12	Afan Lido	38	14	10	14	64	65	−1	52	
13	Mold Alexandra	38	16	3	19	63	69	−6	48 (Note: Mold Alexandra were docked three points for entering administration.)	
14	Llanelli	38	11	8	19	48	64	−16	41	
15	Maesteg Park	38	9	13	16	52	59	−7	40	
16	Flint Town United	38	11	6	21	47	67	−20	39	
17	Briton Ferry Athletic	38	10	9	19	61	87	−26	39	
18	Newtown	38	9	9	20	55	87	−32	36	
19	Llanidloes Town (R)	38	7	9	22	48	93	−45	30	Relegation to Cymru Alliance
20	Abergavenny Thursdays (R)	38	7	7	24	36	76	−40	28	Relegation to Welsh First Division

Source: RSSSF.com
Rules for classification: 1) points; 2) goal difference; 3) number of goals scored.
(C) Champions; (R) Relegated

== Results ==
Home \ Away	AGV	ABE	AFA	BAN	BRI	CWS	CQN	CON	CWM	EBB	FTU	HAV	HOL	INC	LLA	LID	MAE	MOL	NTW	POR
Abergavenny Thursdays		0–1	0–6	0–1	3–4	1–2	0–2	2–1	2–2	2–2	2–2	3–1	1–3	3–2	0–0	0–2	0–0	0–2	3–1	1–1
Aberystwyth Town	2–0		1–0	0–2	6–0	3–2	3–1	0–2	0–2	4–1	2–0	0–2	3–1	1–3	2–2	5–1	3–1	1–1	6–1	2–2
Afan Lido	2–1	0–1		1–0	3–2	2–2	2–1	2–3	0–0	1–3	1–0	0–3	2–1	0–0	1–2	3–1	3–3	4–2	2–1	0–1
Bangor City	3–1	1–0	3–2		2–4	4–1	1–2	4–1	2–3	1–0	4–0	3–0	0–6	0–1	4–3	6–1	1–1	7–1	3–1	1–1
Briton Ferry Athletic	1–3	1–2	1–1	2–5		1–1	0–3	1–3	0–4	1–1	3–1	1–1	2–0	2–3	1–1	7–1	2–2	0–4	6–1	4–0
Caersws	1–3	5–0	2–0	2–1	0–0		0–0	2–0	1–2	0–0	3–0	1–3	0–1	1–2	2–2	0–0	3–1	5–2	1–1	0–3
Connah's Quay Nomads	2–1	1–3	5–2	0–0	1–3	2–1		1–0	0–1	5–0	4–1	2–0	4–2	1–2	0–3	1–1	3–1	1–3	4–1	0–1
Conwy United	1–0	3–1	2–2	0–2	4–2	0–0	4–3		0–1	2–0	2–1	2–1	0–0	0–1	1–0	5–2	1–0	0–4	1–1	0–0
Cwmbran Town	1–0	2–0	3–0	2–2	1–0	1–1	6–1	2–2		0–1	2–0	1–0	1–1	3–0	2–1	2–1	3–1	2–0	1–1	2–1
Ebbw Vale	3–0	3–2	5–4	1–1	10–0	5–3	3–2	1–0	0–1		1–3	2–2	0–0	2–5	1–0	3–1	2–0	1–1	5–2	1–1
Flint Town United	2–0	0–2	2–0	0–3	3–1	1–2	1–3	1–1	0–0	0–2		0–1	0–2	0–2	1–1	4–1	1–2	1–1	0–3	3–1
Haverfordwest County	1–2	1–3	2–3	2–2	3–1	1–2	4–0	1–3	0–5	3–0	4–3		2–0	0–1	2–1	1–1	5–2	5–3	1–2	1–2
Holywell Town	3–0	1–3	1–1	2–0	2–0	5–0	0–0	2–2	1–3	1–4	3–1	0–1		2–0	3–1	1–3	1–1	4–2	1–1	0–1
Inter Cardiff	1–0	1–2	5–2	4–0	5–1	4–1	4–0	1–0	0–0	1–2	1–1	2–3	2–0		4–1	2–1	0–0	1–0	5–1	2–1
Llanelli	1–0	0–3	0–2	1–3	1–0	0–2	1–3	1–2	0–1	4–2	1–3	1–1	0–2	1–4		4–2	3–2	2–0	3–0	0–3
Llanidloes Town	1–1	0–6	2–2	1–3	2–1	0–2	3–2	3–0	1–0	3–4	2–4	1–2	1–5	1–1	0–1		0–1	2–1	0–3	1–1
Maesteg Park	3–0	0–2	2–2	5–0	1–1	3–2	4–0	1–1	0–3	0–2	0–1	2–0	3–0	0–2	1–1	1–1		1–2	1–0	1–1
Mold Alexandra	3–1	1–3	1–2	3–1	1–2	2–3	2–1	2–1	1–0	0–1	1–3	3–0	1–4	0–1	1–0	4–2	1–0		4–0	0–3
Newtown	1–0	1–3	1–1	3–1	2–3	1–5	1–2	3–0	1–2	2–2	1–2	4–3	0–1	1–4	2–2	2–0	4–4	1–3		1–0
Porthmadog	9–0	3–4	0–3	0–0	0–0	3–2	2–3	0–1	0–2	3–0	2–1	1–3	2–3	2–0	1–2	2–2	2–1	3–0	2–2	

Legend: Blue = home team win; Yellow = draw; Red = away team win.

== Top goalscorers ==
Goals	Player	Team
39	Steve Woods	Ebbw Vale
26	Tim O'Connor	Afan Lido
25	David O'Gorman	Connah's Quay Nomads
25	Chris Summers	Inter Cardiff
23	David Taylor	Conwy United
22	Francis Ford	Briton Ferry Athletic
21	Chris Davies	Connah's Quay Nomads
20	Kevin Morrison	Aberystywth Town
18	Mitch Patton	Afan Lido
17	Michael Davies	Aberystwyth Town
17	Ian Howat	Holywell Town

== See also ==
- 1992–93 in Welsh football
