= Newtown A.F.C. =

Association football club in Wales

Newtown AFC
- Full name: Newtown AFC
- Nickname: The Robins
- Founded: 1875; 151 years ago
- Ground: Latham Park
- Capacity: 5,000 (1,300 seated)
- Chairman: Nick Evans
- Manager: James Owen
- League: Cymru North
- 2025–26: Cymru North, 4th of 16
Home colours	Away colours	Third colours

Newtown Association Football Club (Welsh: Clwb Pêl-droed y Drenewydd) is a Welsh football club based in Newtown, Powys, which plays in the Cymru North

The club plays at Latham Park, Newtown, which accommodates 5,000 spectators.

== History ==
The club has its origins in two previous clubs, both active from 1875; Newtown and White Stars. The latter won the 1878–79 Welsh Cup and in the aftermath an attempt was made to merge the clubs under the name Excelsior. The Newtown club folded into the Excelsior, but White Stars continued, and absorbed the Excelsior in 1880. After losing the 1880–81 Welsh Cup final, the White Stars disbanded; but a meeting at the Lion Hotel on 23 July 1884 re-established a Newtown association football club, featuring many of the players and officials who had been involved with the White Stars, and, in some cases, with the original Newtown club beforehand.

The revived club won the 1894–95 Welsh Cup, beating Wrexham 3–2 at Welshpool, despite Goodwin in goal being ordered off for retaliation before the second half (while Newtown was 2–1 down), but in July 1900 it lost the use of the Cunnings, and, with diminished gates and additional expenses, there were fears for the future of the club. Another article from March 1901 referred to Newtown being defunct, and hoped that Newtown Excelsior would resuscitate the club. Newtown North End and Royal Welsh Warehouse Newtown emerged in the town in their place. In 1910, they were still inactive. No records exist of Newtown Football Club again until 1919.

For most of the years since the 1920s the club operated in the Mid-Wales League, or the Central Wales League as it was sometimes known, winning the championship in 1975–76, 1978–79, 1981–82, 1986–87 and 1987–88 and on the strength of this record, the club gained entry to the English league system in the Northern Premier League.

In 1992 the club became rather reluctant founder members of the League of Wales. Since then it has finished runners-up in the league in both 1995–96 and 1997–98, and subsequently played UEFA cup ties against Skonto Riga of Latvia and Wisła Kraków of Poland.

Newtown Association Football Club are one of the oldest clubs in Wales, being formed in 1875 and are one of the founder members of the FAW. In addition, the club was also one of the founder members of the League of Wales, now known as the Cymru Premier.

The club has a long tradition with the move in the late 1980s into the Northern Premier League being part of the progressive nature of the club.

Way back in 1877, Newtown took part in the first Welsh Cup tie on Saturday 13 October against Druids of Ruabon. Cefn Druids now former members of the Welsh Premier are derived from this club. Wrexham went on to win the competition but in the following season, Newtown White Stars beat the favourites Wrexham 2–1 in Oswestry and became the first club to receive the famous trophy, which had only been purchased a few months earlier. In December 1895 Newtown travelled to play Manchester City at Maine Road and shocked the City team by winning 3–2. Newtown's W. Parry scored all three goals for the Robins.

In 2014 Newtown became the second Cymru Premier club, after The New Saints, to change their grass turf for a 3G pitch. During the 2014–15 season Newtown finished in the top six for the second consecutive season. They also took part in their first Welsh Cup final in 118 Years after memorable wins against Caersws, Bangor and Rhyl. However they lost the match 2–0 to The New Saints, despite it being played at Latham Park in front of a capacity crowd. After the cup final defeat, Newtown entered the European play-offs. During the play-offs, they won away at Port Talbot Town and won away at Aberystwyth Town to take a spot in the 2015–16 Europa League qualifiers.

In July 2015 Newtown faced Maltese opponents Valletta in the first round of qualifying for the 2015-16 Europa League. A last minute winner in the 1st leg at Latham Park gave the club their first European win and was followed with an away victory giving Newtown their first Europa League Win over two legs. Newtown faced Danish giants Copenhagen in the second round and were defeated over both legs losing 5–1 on aggregate. Newtown finished in the top 6 again during the following 2015-16 Welsh Premier League season and were also the only team to beat The New Saints at Park Hall, but eventually lost at home to Airbus UK Broughton in the play-off semi final. Newtown again reached the play-offs after finishing 7th in the 2016-17 Welsh Premier League season, but were beaten 3–2 away to Bangor City.

On 13 April 2025, after the most dreadful season Newtown lost 3–2 against Aberystwyth and were relegated for the first time in their history.

== Honours ==
- Welsh Cup
  - Winners: 1878–79, 1894–95
  - Runner-up: 1880–81, 1885–86, 1887–88, 1896–97, 2014–15
- Welsh League Cup
  - Runner-up: 2011–12
- League of Wales
  - Runner-up: 1995–96, 1997–98
- Welsh Amateur Cup/Welsh Intermediate Cup
  - Winners: 1954–55
  - Finalists: 1985–86, 1987–88
- Ladies Welsh Cup
  - Finalists: 2003–04
- Mid Wales League
  - Winners: 1975–76, 1978–79, 1981–82, 1986–87, 1987–88, 1995–96 (Reserves), 2008–09 (Reserves)
- CWFA Challenge Cup
  - Winners: 1974–75, 1980–81, 1992–93, 2025–26
- Summer Cup
  - Winners: 1994–95, 1995–96
- Mid Wales South League
  - Winners: 1981–82, 1983–84 (Reserves)
- Arthur Barritt Cup
  - Winners: 1986–87
- Central Wales Cup
  - Winners: 1992–93, 1993–94
- Central Wales Floodlit Cup
  - Winners: 1994–95
- Mid Wales League Cup
  - Winners: 1994–95, 1997–98
- Montgomeryshire Cup
  - Winners: 1922–23, 1936–37, 1947–48, 1949–50, 1951–52, 1954–55, 1955–56, 1956–57, 1957–58, 1965–66, 1966–67, 1967–68, 1968–69, 1978–79, 1981–82, 1995–96, 2008–09
- Radnorshire Cup
  - Winners: 1980–81 (Reserves)
  - Finalists: 1969–70, 1986–87 (Reserves)
- UEFA Cup/Europa League
  - Preliminary round qualifiers: 1996–97, 1998–99, 2015–16
- Shropshire League
  - Winners: 1892–93

== Players ==
=== Current squad ===
As of 5 September 2026

Note: Flags indicate national team as defined under FIFA eligibility rules; some limited exceptions apply. Players may hold more than one non-FIFA nationality.

No.	Pos.	Nation	Player
1	GK	WAL	Dave Jones
2	DF	ENG	Alfie Clark
4	DF	WAL	Steffan Jones
5	DF	WAL	Kieron Mills-Evans
7	FW	WAL	Jamie Hyne
8	MF	WAL	Sean Griffiths
9	FW	WAL	Joshua Ashley
10	DF	IRL	Uniss Kargbo (on loan from Colwyn Bay)
11	MF	WAL	Ryan Edwards
12	DF	IRL	Issa Kargbo (on loan from Colwyn Bay)
13	GK	ROU	Andrei Nazaru

No.	Pos.	Nation	Player
14	MF	WAL	James Owen (Player/ manager)
15	FW	ENG	Manny Osei
16	DF	WAL	Mike Pearson (Player/ assistant manager)
17	FW	ENG	Danny Andrews
18	FW	WAL	Scott Moncrieff
19	FW	GER	Christoph Aziamale
20	DF	WAL	Jojo Harries
21	FW	ITA	Hanock Boakye
23	MF	IRL	Rian O'Riordan
24	DF	WAL	Harrison Lewis
—	DF	WAL	Dean Bryan
—	DF	WAL	Callum Roberts

=== Technical staff ===
Position	Name
Manager	(Wales) James Owen
Assistant Manager	(Wales) Mike Pearson
Academy Manager	(Wales)
Goalkeeping Coach	Dave Owen
First-team Coach	
Physio	(Wales)
Sports Therapist	(England)
Kit Manager	(Wales) Dave Rose

== Managers ==
- (Scotland) Brian Coyne (1992–03)
- (England) Roger Preece (2003–06)
- (England) Darren Ryan (2006–10)
- (England) Andy Cale (2010–11)
- (England) Darren Ryan (2011)
- (Northern Ireland) Bernard McNally (2011–13)
- (Wales) Chris Hughes (2013–2024)
- (Wales) Scott Ruscoe (2024)
- (Wales) Callum McKenzie (2024–2025)

== Europe ==
Newtown have participated in UEFA competition five times.

Season	Competition	Round	Club	Home	Away	Aggregate
1996–97	UEFA Cup	PR	(Latvia) Skonto FC	1–4	0–3	1–7
1998–99	UEFA Cup	1Q	(Poland) Wisła Kraków	0–0	0–7	0–7
2015–16	UEFA Europa League	1Q	(Malta) Valletta	2–1	2–1	4–2
2015–16	UEFA Europa League	2Q	(Denmark) Copenhagen	1–3	0–2	1–5
2021–22	UEFA Europa Conference League	1Q	(Republic of Ireland) Dundalk	0–1	0–4	0–5
2022–23	UEFA Europa Conference League	1Q	(Faroe Islands) HB Tórshavn	2–1 (a.e.t.)	0–1	2–2 (4–2 p)
2022–23	UEFA Europa Conference League	2Q	(Slovakia) Spartak Trnava	1–2	1–4	2–6

Notes

- PR: Preliminary round
- 1Q: First qualifying round
- 2Q: Second qualifying round

Name	Competition	Goals
Jason Oswell	UEFA Europa League	2
Henry Cowans	UEFA Europa Conference League	2
Tom Goodwin	UEFA Europa League	1
Matty Owen	UEFA Europa League	1
Luke Boundford	UEFA Europa League	1
Lifumpa Mwandwe	UEFA Europa Conference League	1
Aaron Williams	UEFA Europa Conference League	1
Romilly Brown	UEFA Cup	1

== Rivalries ==
Newtown share a local rivalry with Caersws who are only around 5 miles away and often attract big crowds when the teams meet. In the Cymru Premier Newtown have derby matches against fellow Mid-Wales clubs Aberystwyth Town and The New Saints.

== League record ==
Season	League	Position	Pld	W	D	L	F	A	Pts
1959–60	Mid Wales League	7th	26	12	5	9	73	54	29
1960–61	Mid Wales League	6th	24	10	3	11	64	42	23
1961–62	Mid Wales League	6th	20	10	2	8	54	42	22
1962–63	Mid Wales League	7th	22	11	2	9	49	52	24
1963–64	Mid Wales League	8th	24	9	4	11	51	62	22
1964–65	Mid Wales League	6th	24	10	4	10	64	49	24
1965–66	Mid Wales League	9th	26	9	7	10	60	62	25
1966–67	Mid Wales League	8th	26	12	3	11	60	56	27
1967–68	Mid Wales League	4th	26	15	3	8	76	49	33
1968–69	Mid Wales League	4th	26	15	6	5	68	39	36
1969–70	Mid Wales League	11th	30	10	4	16	62	73	24
1970–71	Mid Wales League	11th	28	6	7	15	46	77	19
1971–72	Mid Wales League	11th	26	5	9	12	34	50	19
1972–73	Mid Wales League	13th	26	3	6	17	—	—	12
1973–74	Mid Wales League	11th	26	7	5	14	32	48	19
1974–75	Mid Wales League	2nd	26	18	4	4	—	—	40
1975–76	Mid Wales League	1st	28	20	3	5	86	33	43
1976–77	Mid Wales League	4th	28	15	3	10	54	45	33
1977–78	Mid Wales League	7th	28	9	10	9	50	43	28
1978–79	Mid Wales League	1st	30	25	2	3	77	22	52
1979–80	Mid Wales League	3rd	30	19	3	8	68	40	41
1980–81	Mid Wales League	3rd	26	16	5	5	53	18	37
1981–82	Mid Wales League	1st	26	21	3	2	77	24	45
1982–83	Mid Wales League	2nd	22	12	7	3	52	25	31
1983–84	Mid Wales League	6th	28	14	8	6	67	38	36
1984–85	Mid Wales League	5th	28	13	7	8	70	53	33
1985–86	Mid Wales League	3rd	26	15	6	5	65	30	36
1986–87	Mid Wales League	1st	24	20	2	2	67	16	42
1987–88	Mid Wales League	1st	24	20	2	2	72	21	42
1988–89	NPL First Division	9th	42	15	12	15	65	59	57
1989–90	NPL First Division	14th	42	14	12	16	49	62	54
1990–91	NPL First Division	13th	42	13	12	17	68	75	51
1991–92	NPL First Division	14th	42	15	6	21	60	95	51
1992–93	League of Wales	18th	38	9	9	20	55	87	36
1993–94	League of Wales	6th	38	18	9	11	52	48	63
1994–95	League of Wales	4th	38	20	8	10	78	47	68
1995–96	League of Wales	2nd	40	23	11	6	69	25	80
1996–97	League of Wales	5th	40	22	5	13	74	49	71
1997–98	League of Wales	2nd	38	23	9	6	101	47	78
1998–99	League of Wales	6th	32	13	10	9	45	35	49
1999–00	League of Wales	8th	34	14	6	14	49	41	48
2000–01	League of Wales	4th	34	18	4	12	68	37	58
2001–02	League of Wales	13th	34	9	11	14	35	44	38
2002–03	Welsh Premier League	10th	34	12	6	16	48	54	42
2003–04	Welsh Premier League	10th	32	12	5	15	43	50	41
2004–05	Welsh Premier League	10th	34	13	7	14	49	55	46
2005–06	Welsh Premier League	16th	34	10	6	18	42	61	31
2006–07	Welsh Premier League	16th	32	6	6	20	30	63	24
2007–08	Welsh Premier League	13th	34	9	10	15	47	66	37
2008–09	Welsh Premier League	10th	34	10	10	14	46	54	40
2009–10	Welsh Premier League	13th	34	10	11	13	54	57	41
2010–11	Welsh Premier League	9th	32	8	11	13	40	55	35
2011–12	Welsh Premier League	12th	32	7	5	20	44	82	23
2012–13	Welsh Premier League	9th	32	10	7	15	44	54	37
2013–14	Welsh Premier League	5th	32	12	6	14	46	58	42
2014–15	Welsh Premier League	6th	32	10	8	14	52	65	38
2015–16	Welsh Premier League	5th	32	11	9	12	46	54	42
2016–17	Welsh Premier League	7th	32	12	9	11	59	41	45
2017–18	Welsh Premier League	8th	32	12	4	16	52	55	40
2018–19	Welsh Premier League	5th	32	13	7	12	53	56	46
2019–20	Cymru Premier	6th	25 (Note: League was suspended on 13th March due to COVID-19 pandemic)	10	5	10	25	30	35
2020–21	Cymru Premier	7th	32	12	6	14	57	53	42
2021–22	Cymru Premier	3rd	32	15	6	11	50	35	51
2022–23	Cymru Premier	6th	32	12	5	15	49	56	41
2023–24	Cymru Premier	4th	32	13	5	14	49	46	44
2024–25	Cymru Premier	11th	32	6	8	18	36	65	26
2025–26	Cymru North								
