= Lido Ground =

Field sports stadium in Aberavon, Wales

The Lido Ground
- Marstons Stadium
- Interactive map of The Lido Ground
- Location: Princess Margaret Way, Aberavon, Wales
- Coordinates: 51°35′30″N 3°48′33″W
- Capacity: 4,200 (601 seated)
- Record attendance: 546 (24 January 2009 vs. Goytre United F.C.)

Tenants
- Afan Lido F.C.

The Lido Ground, currently known as the Marstons Stadium for sponsorship purposes, is a field sports stadium located on Princess Margaret Way in Aberavon, Wales.

== History ==
The first Wales women's international match to be played under the auspices of the Football Association of Wales was played here on 6 September, 1993 against Iceland. Wales lost 1-0.

== Facilities ==
It has a capacity of 4,200 (601 seated) and is the home of Afan Lido F.C. The record attendance at the stadium for a Welsh Premier League game is 509, against Port Talbot Town on Boxing Day 2001. The record Welsh Football League attendance is 546 on 24 January 2009 against Goytre United F.C. Both of the record crowds occurred during high-profile derby games.
