= Cymru Premier =

Association football league in Wales

- Founded: 1992
- Country: Wales
- Other club from: England (1 team)
- Confederation: UEFA
- Number of clubs: 16
- Level on pyramid: 1
- Relegation to: Cymru North; Cymru South
- Domestic cup: Welsh Cup
- International cups: UEFA Champions League; UEFA Conference League
- Current champions: The New Saints (18th title) (2025–26)
- Most championships: The New Saints (18 titles)
- Most appearances: Chris Venables (600)
- Top scorer: Marc Lloyd Williams (319)
- Broadcasters: S4C (1 game per round on, S4C Clic, YouTube and BBC iPlayer, select games on terrestrial); BBC Cymru Wales (minimum 20 games per season on BBC iPlayer); Cymru Football TV (every game); BBC Cymru Wales (minimum 20 games per season on BBC iPlayer); Cymru Football TV (every game)
- Website: faw.cymru/cymru-leagues/cymru-premier/
- Current: 2026–27 Cymru Premier

The Cymru Premier, known as the Novira Cymru Premier for sponsorship reasons, is the national football league of Wales (Welsh: Cymru). It has both professional and semi-professional status clubs and is at the top of the Welsh football league system. It was founded in 1992, as the first league representing all of Wales. Prior to 2002, the league was known as the League of Wales (LoW), but changed its name as part of a sponsorship deal to the Welsh Premier League. The league was rebranded as the Cymru Premier for the 2019–20 season. Though formed relatively recently, the league contains some of the oldest clubs in world football. Eleven current or former members of the league were founded in the 1870s or 1880s, with many more formed before the end of the 19th century. The vast majority of its clubs are still owned and run by the local community or by people from the area.

It operates on a promotion and relegation system with Tier 2 of the Welsh football league system, the Cymru North and Cymru South leagues. The Cymru Premier League is currently contested by 16 teams, with each team playing each other home and away during the first phase. At the end of this period the league splits into two divisions, with the top 6 teams going on to the Championship Conference, and the bottom 6 teams into the Play-Off Conference. Each team playing each other a further two times, home and away, with the champion being decided by the team with the most points in the Championship Conference, and the lowest two teams in Play-Off Conference relegated. Seasons usually run from August to May, with each team playing 32 matches in total. It was expand to 16 teams in 2026–27, with a changed format, and the games previously played at 2.30pm on Saturday afternoons now taking place on Friday evenings.

Cymru Premier is currently ranked 54th in the UEFA coefficients based on the performances by teams in European competition over the past 5 years, giving 4 of its teams opportunities in European football qualifiers.

The current champions are TNS who won the league for the 18th time in the 2025–26 season. Seven teams have won the competition since its inception: TNS (18), Barry Town (7), Bangor City (3), Connah's Quay Nomads (2), Rhyl (2), Llanelli (1) and Cwmbran Town (1). As of the 2024–25 season 42 clubs have participated in Wales' top flight league.

Wales
Location of the 2026–27 Cymru Premier teams.

== Formation ==
=== Original League ===
The league was formed in October 1991 by Alun Evans, Secretary General of the Football Association of Wales (FAW), as he believed that the Welsh international football team was under threat from FIFA. The FAW, along with the other three home nations' associations (The Football Association, Irish Football Association and Scottish Football Association), had a permanent seat on the International Football Association Board (IFAB) and it was thought that many FIFA members were resentful of this and pressing for the four unions to unite into one combined side for the whole of the United Kingdom.

The new league was formed for the 1992–93 season, and officially launched on 15 August 1992. At the time, despite the FAW being a FIFA and UEFA member it had not previously organised a national league, only the Welsh Cup.

On its formation the league consisted of a number of teams previously playing in regional leagues across Wales, plus a small number of clubs that had been playing in the English league system. Because of historically poor north–south transport links through mountainous mid-Wales (although these have improved in the post World War II years), it was sometimes easier for Welsh clubs to travel east–west to play football, so some Welsh clubs looked east to England for competitors. Teams in Wales that had played in the English leagues included Aberdare Athletic, Cardiff City, Merthyr Town, Newport County, Swansea City and Wrexham. Many semi-professional sides in Wales also played in both the Welsh and English football league system at different points in their history; Bangor City were founder members of the North Wales Coast League in 1893 and the Welsh National League in 1921, before the Alliance Premier League (now the National League) in 1979 and reached the FA Trophy final in 1984. They transferred back once again to the Welsh system and the new League of Wales in 1992.

While the league itself is relatively young, many of its clubs are among the oldest in the world, having played in North, Mid and South Wales regional leagues since the 19th century. A number of the current members of the league are over 100 years older than the league itself. Many more of the leagues clubs current and ex-clubs were formed before 1900. The current oldest member is Newtown, formed in 1875.

=== Further recruitment ===
The formation of the League of Wales saw the start of a bitter dispute between the Football Association of Wales (FAW) and those non-League clubs who wanted to remain part of the English football pyramid. The 'Irate Eight', as they were dubbed, consisted of Bangor City, Barry Town, Caernarfon Town, Colwyn Bay, Merthyr Tydfil, Newport, Newtown and Rhyl. At the time, Cardiff City, Swansea City and Wrexham were playing in The Football League, and the FAW decided to allow those teams to continue to play in the English system, although they continued to compete in the Welsh Cup for a few more seasons. The success of these clubs in the Welsh Cups meant that they frequently competed in the European Cup Winners' Cup despite the fact that Wrexham had never played above the Second Division and Swansea had spent just two seasons in the First Division during the early 1980s, while Cardiff had been semi-regular members of the First Division from the 1920s up to 1962.

Prior to the inaugural season, Bangor City, Newtown and Rhyl agreed to play in the League of Wales. However, as Rhyl's application to join the league was late, they were placed in the second level of the pyramid system. Because of FAW sanctions, the remaining five clubs were forced to play their home matches in England. Following a season in exile at Worcester City, five became four, as Barry Town joined the Welsh pyramid in time for the 1993–94 season.

A court ruling in 1995 allowed the remaining four clubs to return to Wales to play their home matches while still remaining within the English system; despite this victory, Caernarfon Town decided to join the League of Wales for the 1995–96 season. Colwyn Bay continued in the English pyramid for a further 24 years before transferring to the Welsh pyramid in 2019, leaving only two of the Irate Eight remaining - Newport County, who won promotion to the Football League in 2013, and Merthyr Town, the successor club to Merthyr Tydfil following its liquidation in 2010. In 2008, Wrexham were relegated from the Football League and after an absence of 15 years, returned through automatic promotion at the end of the 2022–23 season.

Conversely, in 1996 now-defunct English team Oswestry Town were accepted by the League of Wales and currently The New Saints are based in Oswestry (having moved from Llansantffraid, Powys in 2007). Another English club, Chester City, whose stadium sits on the England–Wales border, applied to join the Welsh Premier League after being expelled from the Football Conference in 2010 but were wound up almost immediately afterwards (their successor team, Chester F.C., opted to reapply within the English system).

=== Renewed calls to recruit Welsh teams ===
Welsh football teams that currently play in the English football system include: Cardiff City, Swansea City and Wrexham (in the EFL Championship), Newport County (EFL League Two), and Merthyr Town (National League North).

Some have called for all Welsh teams to be recruited into Cymru Premier, but in particular the lower ranked Merthyr Town as they are in the English non-league setup.

=== Future ===
In April 2024, the Football Association of Wales released a six-year strategic plan to enhance league's competitiveness and announcing a multi-million euro investment in the league and its teams. The plans included increasing the number of teams competing in the league, revamping the competition format, and introducing Friday night league play.

In September 2024, the FAW confirmed the new league format would start in the 2026–27 season and would consist of 16 teams each playing each other home and away before being split into three tiers of six, four and six clubs. The top six in the table will play each other once more, with the club topping the table after Matchday 35 crowned champions. Teams finishing second through sixth qualify for the end of season European qualification play-offs. Clubs ranked seventh through tenth will play each other once more, with the club placing seventh after Matchday 33 receiving the final play-off spot for European qualification. The remaining teams ranked eleventh and below will also play each other once more. At the end of Matchday 35, the two lowest clubs will be automatically relegated, while the club in 14th will compete in the relegation play-off with the qualifiers from Cymru South and Cymru North to play in the next season's Cymru Premier.

For the 2026–27 season the league introduced "VAR Light", a simpler and cheaper system of VAR. It had initially been planned to start from 2025–26.

== Structure ==
=== Promotion and relegation ===
Clubs are promoted to the Cymru Premier from the Cymru North in the north/ central Wales and the Cymru South in the south/ central Wales. Clubs who finish as champions of the feeder leagues, or as runners-up if the champions decide not to seek promotion, are promoted subject to an application for membership being received and accepted and the stadium and infrastructure safety criteria of the Cymru Premier being met.

No teams were promoted to the Welsh Premier League following the 2005–06 season. However, Cardiff Grange Quins, who finished bottom of the Welsh Premier League resigned leaving the league to operate with an odd number of clubs for 2006–07.

Eighteen clubs competed in the Welsh Premier League for the 2007–08 season as both Neath Athletic (Welsh Football League Division One) and Llangefni Town (Cymru Alliance) were promoted whilst Cwmbran Town were relegated to Welsh Football League Division One.

For 2008–09, Prestatyn Town played in the Welsh Premier League for the first time after promotion from the Cymru Alliance, whilst Llangefni Town were relegated to the Cymru Alliance after only one season.

The 2009–10 season saw Bala Town promoted to the Welsh Premier League after they won the Cymru Alliance in 2008–09. They replaced Caernarfon Town who were relegated to the Cymru Alliance.

At the end of the 2009–10 season, due to league restructuring Connah's Quay, Porthmadog, Welshpool Town, Caersws and Cefn Druids were relegated to the Cymru Alliance league. Rhyl were also relegated to the Cymru Alliance, despite finishing 6th in the Welsh Premier League, as they failed to meet the financial criteria required to gain the Welsh Premier League domestic licence. No teams were promoted to the Welsh Premier League from the feeder leagues.

=== League restructure for 2010–11 season ===
The 18 Welsh Premier League clubs met on 13 April 2008 and voted to support a restructuring proposal put forward by Welsh Premier League secretary John Deakin which would replace the single Welsh Premier League with a First and Second Division with 10 teams in each Division for the 2010–11 season. A further proposal was accepted that the Football Association of Wales should take full control of the Welsh Premier League and the existing Company, 'Football League of Wales Limited' should be dissolved. These proposals were forwarded to the Football Association of Wales for their consideration.

In June 2009 the clubs voted to accept an alternative proposal to reduce the premier League from 18 clubs to 12 for the 2010–11 season onwards.

== Current structure ==
The season is split into two phases, and concludes with an end of season Playoff to determine Wales' fourth European side for the following year.

=== Phase 1 ===
Phase 1 runs from Match Day 1 in August through to Match Day 22 in mid-January. Each team plays the other sides in the league twice, once at home and once away, making a total of twenty-two games.

After the conclusion of Phase 1, the league splits in two, with the top six teams forming the Championship Conference, and the bottom six teams forming the Playoff Conference. All points accumulated by teams in Phase 1 are brought forward into Phase 2.

=== Phase 2 ===
Phase 2 then runs from Match Day 23 at the start of February through to Match Day 32 at the end of April. Each side plays the other five in their conference twice more, home and away, to bring up a total of thirty-two games played.

The side finishing top of the Championship Conference after thirty-two games is the League Champion, and will qualify for the UEFA Champions League. To date six teams have won the title in twenty-six seasons.

The runners-up in the Championship Conference qualify automatically for the UEFA Europa Conference League, whilst the remaining teams qualify for the end of season European Playoffs.

The bottom two sides in the Playoff Conference are relegated. Meanwhile, the side finishing top of the Playoff Conference (seventh place in the league table) advances to the European Playoffs.

Note that sides in the Playoff Conference can finish no higher in the table than seventh.

=== European Playoffs ===
The five teams finishing in 3rd–7th contest the end of season European Playoffs. The 6th placed team host 7th in a quarter-final, with the winners travelling to the 3rd placed side for the first semi-final, whilst 4th host 5th in the other.

The winners then meet at the ground of the highest ranked side in the final, with the winners qualifying for the UEFA Europa Conference League.

If one of the five teams has already qualified for Europe by winning the Welsh Cup, then the remaining four sides will contest the playoffs directly from the semi-final stage.

If one of the top two sides wins the JD Welsh Cup, then the third placed side will automatically take up a UEFA Europa Conference League spot. The remaining four sides will then contest the playoffs directly from the semi-final stage.

In seasons where the league's UEFA Coefficient has been amongst the lowest five, meaning only two berths are available in the UEFA Conference League, the playoffs will include the 2nd placed side as well. In 2021–22, the 2nd placed side qualified directly to the Conference League and the playoff winners qualified for the Scottish Challenge Cup instead.

== European competition ==
The champions of the Cymru Premier qualify, along with the champions of every European domestic league, for the UEFA Champions League. The second or third placed teams (depending on who wins the Welsh Cup) qualify for the first qualifying round of the UEFA Europa Conference League.

A place in the first qualifying round of the Europa Conference League is also awarded to the winners of the Welsh Cup. If the winners of the Welsh Cup have already qualified for Europe via their league placing (i.e., finishing in the top two and winning the cup), then the third placed team will qualify directly. The playoff is contested between the sides finishing 3rd–7th, excluding any team already qualified for Europe. In years where Wales are only eligible to enter two teams in the Conference League, only the cup winners (or 2nd place, if the cup winners win the league) will qualify directly for the Conference League and teams finishing 2nd–7th (excluding teams already qualified for Europe) contest the playoff.

Results in Europe have been mixed – some notable successes, such as Barry Town's run to the first round proper of the UEFA Cup, drawing 3–3 with Aberdeen at Jenner Park, Bangor City's win over FC Sartid of Yugoslavia and Barry's 3–1 victory over FC Porto in the UEFA Champions League (albeit losing 3–9 on aggregate), stand alongside some heavy defeats, such as The New Saints' 12–1 aggregate defeat to Amica Wronki of Poland.

In August 2024 The New Saints became the first club from Wales' top flight to enter the group stage of a European competition, when they beat FK Panevezys 3–0 on aggregate to qualify for the UEFA Conference League.

As of October 2024 the Cymru Premier is ranked 49th out of 55 members by the UEFA coefficient, having risen from 52nd the previous year.

== Media coverage ==
For the first four seasons of the league's existence, its results were not featured on the Press Association's vidiprinter service and consequently had not appeared on the BBC's Final Score or Sky's Soccer Saturday. The PA added the league's results at the start of the 1996–97 season, which was also when the PA began providing the results for the Northern Irish league.

Since the start of the 2007–08 season goals and results from the league have appeared on the Press Association vidiprinter service. Prior to this only the full-time score had been displayed although the half time score had also been shown from around 2000. Final Score continues to include the Cymru Premier results as part of their classified football results sequence and for a while Soccer Saturday also included the WPL results but has not done so in recent seasons, and in 2013, Sky Sports removed the league from its vidiprinter as part of a major reduction in the number of competitions that it featured on its vidiprinter service.

On television, brief highlights from one of the day's games were featured on BBC Wales' sports results programme Wales on Saturday whilst the BBC also provided a 30-minute highlights programme for Welsh-language broadcaster, S4C, entitled "Y Clwb Pêl-droed". When the corporation lost the international broadcast rights to BSkyB at the end of the 2003/4 season, S4C won the secondary rights package which included highlights of the national team and all domestic rights. Sgorio took over the "Clwb Pêl-droed" slot previously produced by the BBC and in 2010/11 the half-hour highlights programme was dropped in favour of one live game per week. S4C broadcasts in Wales and throughout the rest of the UK via digital satellite with an interactive option for English-language commentary available via digital satellite. In 2026, the BBC re-signed with the league, showing a minimum of 20 games a season

As of the 2026–27 season, S4C show one live game per matchweek from either the league or Welsh Cup. They also stream all live televised matches on the Sgorio YouTube page. The BBC show 20 games a season exclusively on iPlayer, and the FAW stream all games on in-house pay platform Cymru Football TV.

Weekly highlights of all league games are shown on Sgorio's social media and YouTube channels.

The advent of the League has brought increased media coverage for its member clubs, notably from the Western Mail and Daily Post, as well as local press.

== Clubs ==
Of the 20 clubs that played in the inaugural season of the League of Wales, ten have since been relegated yet to return, with one, Ebbw Vale, folding in 1998. For a list of all clubs past and present see List of Cymru Premier clubs. For a list of winners and runners-up of the Cymru Premier since its inception, and top scorers for each season, see List of Welsh football champions.

Only two clubs have played in every season League of Wales/Cymru Premier since its inception. These two clubs are Aberystwyth Town and Newtown. As these clubs have been relegated as of the 2024–25 season, this will no longer be the case when the 2025–26 season kicks off.

== Managers ==
Current Cymru Premier managers
Manager	Nationality	Club	Appointed	Time as manager
Rhys Griffiths	Wales	Penybont	1 July 2016	10 years, 143 days
Johnny Haseldin	England	Holywell Town	28 September 2018	8 years, 54 days
Tony Pennock	Wales	Haverfordwest County	1 July 2022	4 years, 143 days
Craig Harrison	England	The New Saints	4 August 2022	4 years, 109 days
Mark Allan	Wales	Airbus UK Broughton	21 April 2023	3 years, 214 days
Richard Davies	Wales	Caernarfon Town	24 April 2023	3 years, 211 days
Jordan Hadaway	Wales	Llandudno	7 July 2023	3 years, 137 days
Ryan Jenkins	Wales	Cardiff Met	25 July 2023	3 years, 119 days
Andy Hill	Wales	Trefelin	19 October 2023	3 years, 33 days
Andy Dyer	Wales	Briton Ferry Llansawel	5 November 2023	3 years, 16 days
Michael Wilde	England	Colwyn Bay	11 May 2024	2 years, 194 days
Liam Williams	Wales	Cambrian United	1 July 2024	2 years, 143 days
Wyn Thomas	Wales	Ammanford	22 August 2024	2 years, 91 days
John Disney	Ireland	Connah's Quay Nomads	23 May 2025	1 year, 182 days
Andy Legg	Wales	Barry Town United	4 February 2026	290 days
Steve Evans	Wales	Flint Town United	19 March 2026	247 days

== Sponsorship ==
Period	Sponsor	Brand
1992–1993	Konica Peter Llewellyn Limited of Swansea	Konica League of Wales
1993–2002	No sponsor	League of Wales
2002–2004	JT Hughes Mitsubishi	JT Hughes Mitsubishi Welsh Premiership
2004–2006	Vauxhall Masterfit Retailers	Vauxhall Masterfit Retailers Welsh Premier League
2006–2011	Principality Building Society	Principality Building Society Welsh Premier Football League
2011–2015	CorbettSports.com	Corbett Sports Welsh Premier League
2015–2017	Dafabet	The Dafabet Welsh Premier League
2017–2019	JD Sports	The JD Welsh Premier League
2019–2026	JD Sports	JD Cymru Premier
2026–	Novira Technologies	Novira Cymru Premier

== Champions ==
Seasons	Winners	Runners-up	Third place	Notes
1992–93	Cwmbran Town (1)	Inter Cardiff	Aberystwyth Town	–
1993–94	Bangor City (1)	Inter Cardiff	Ton Pentre	–
1994–95	Bangor City (2)	Afan Lido	Ton Pentre	–
1995–96	Barry Town (1)	Newtown	Conwy United	–
1996–97	Barry Town (2)	Inter CableTel	Ebbw Vale	Treble with Welsh Cup and Welsh League Cup
1997–98	Barry Town (3)	Newtown	Ebbw Vale	Double with Welsh League Cup
1998–99	Barry Town (4)	Inter CableTel	Cwmbran Town	Treble with FAW Premier Cup and Welsh League Cup
1999–00	Total Network Solutions (1)	Barry Town	Cwmbran Town	–
2000–01	Barry Town (5)	Cwmbran Town	Carmarthen Town	Double with Welsh Cup
2001–02	Barry Town (6)	Total Network Solutions	Bangor City	Double with Welsh Cup
2002–03	Barry Town (7)	Total Network Solutions	Bangor City	Double with Welsh Cup
2003–04	Rhyl (1)	Total Network Solutions	Haverfordwest County	Treble with Welsh Cup and Welsh League Cup
2004–05	Total Network Solutions (2)	Rhyl	Bangor City	Double with Welsh Cup
2005–06	Total Network Solutions (3)	Llanelli	Rhyl	Double with Welsh League Cup
2006–07	The New Saints (4)	Rhyl	Llanelli	Double with FAW Premier Cup
2007–08	Llanelli (1)	The New Saints	Rhyl	Double with Welsh League Cup
2008–09	Rhyl (2)	Llanelli	The New Saints	–
2009–10	The New Saints (5)	Llanelli	Port Talbot Town	Double with Welsh League Cup
2010–11	Bangor City (3)	The New Saints	Neath	–
2011–12	The New Saints (6)	Bangor City	Neath	Double with Welsh Cup
2012–13	The New Saints (7)	Airbus UK Broughton	Bangor City	–
2013–14	The New Saints (8)	Airbus UK Broughton	Carmarthen Town	Double with Welsh Cup
2014–15	The New Saints (9)	Bala Town	Airbus UK Broughton	Treble with Welsh Cup and Welsh League Cup
2015–16	The New Saints (10)	Bala Town	Llandudno	Treble with Welsh Cup and Welsh League Cup
2016–17	The New Saints (11)	Gap Connah's Quay	Bala Town	Double with Welsh League Cup
2017–18	The New Saints (12)	Bangor City	Connah's Quay Nomads	Double with Welsh League Cup
2018–19	The New Saints (13)	Connah's Quay Nomads	Barry Town United	Double with Welsh Cup
2019–20	Connah's Quay Nomads (1)	The New Saints	Bala Town	Double with Welsh League Cup
2020–21	Connah's Quay Nomads (2)	The New Saints	Bala Town	–
2021–22	The New Saints (14)	Bala Town	Newtown	Double with Welsh Cup
2022–23	The New Saints (15)	Connah's Quay Nomads	Penybont	Double with Welsh Cup
2023–24	The New Saints (16)	Connah's Quay Nomads	Bala Town	Double with Welsh League Cup
2024–25	The New Saints (17)	Penybont	Haverfordwest County	Treble with Welsh Cup & Welsh League Cup
2025–26	The New Saints (18)	Connah's Quay Nomads	Penybont	–
2026–27				

== Performances by club ==
Seven clubs have been champions. In bold those competing in the 2025–26 season.

Club	Winners	Runners-up	Third place	Winning years
**The New Saints**	18	7	1	1999–00, 2004–05, 2005–06, 2006–07, 2009–10, 2011–12, 2012–13, 2013–14, 2014–15, 2015–16, 2016–17, 2017–18, 2018–19, 2021–22, 2022–23, 2023–24, 2024–25, 2025–26
**Barry Town United**	7	1	1	1995–96, 1996–97, 1997–98, 1998–99, 2000–01, 2001–02, 2002–03
Bangor City	3	2	4	1993–94, 1994–95, 2010–11
**Connah's Quay Nomads**	2	5	1	2019–20, 2020–21
Rhyl	2	2	2	2003–04, 2008–09
**Llanelli**	1	3	1	2007–08
Cwmbran Town	1	1	2	1992–93
Inter Cardiff	–	4	–	–
**Bala Town**	–	3	4	–
Airbus UK Broughton	–	2	1	–
Newtown	–	2	1	–
**Penybont**	–	1	1	–
Afan Lido	–	1	–	–
Ton Pentre	–	–	2	–
Ebbw Vale	–	–	2	–
Neath	–	–	2	–
Carmarthen Town	–	–	2	–
**Haverfordwest County**	–	–	2	–
Aberystwyth Town	–	–	1	–
Conwy United	–	–	1	–
Llandudno	–	–	1	–
Port Talbot Town	–	–	1	–

Notes:

- The New Saints were known as Llansantffraid until 1996 and Total Network Solutions between then and 2006.

=== Most successful clubs ===
Titles won by club (%)
1. The New Saints – 17 (51.5%)
2. Barry Town United – 7 (21.2%)
3. Bangor City – 3 (9.09%)
4. Rhyl – 2 (6.06%)
5. Connah's Quay – 2 (6.06%)
6. Cwmbran Town – 1 (3.03%)
7. Llanelli – 1 (3.03%)

== Players ==
- Marc Lloyd Williams – scored 319 goals in 467 appearances, making him the most prolific goalscorer in the league's history.
- Chris Venables – holds the record for the number of appearances in the league with 537 games played.
- Paul Harrison – holds the record for the most consecutive appearances in the league with more than 190

== See also ==
- Football in Wales
- Welsh football league system
- Welsh Cup
- Welsh League Cup
- FAW Premier Cup
- List of association football competitions
- List of football clubs in Wales
- List of stadiums in Wales by capacity
