= Mold Alexandra F.C. =

Association football club in Wales

Coordinates: 53.1728°N 3.1434°W

Mold Alexandra
- Full name: Mold Alexandra Football Club
- Founded: 1929
- Ground: Alyn Park
- Capacity: 400 seats - 3,000 spectators in the ground max
- Chairman: Barry Couchman
- Manager: Barry Owen and Liam Groves
- League: Cymru North
- 2025–26: Cymru North, 7th of 16
- Website: http://www.pitchero.com/clubs/moldalex
Home colours	Away colours

Mold Alexandra Football Club is a football club based in Mold in Wales. The club was founded in 1929 and played in local amateur leagues before joining the Welsh National League after the Second World War. The team enjoyed success in the 1980s and became a founder member of the League of Wales in 1992. The side were relegated from the division in 1995 and had dropped several tiers by the end of the decade. They now play in the Cymru North.

The club has played at Alyn Park since they were founded in 1929.

== History ==
Mold Alexandra was formed in 1929. Several teams had previously been established in the town including Mold Town which folded a year after Alexandra was founded. Alexandra joined the Mold, Deeside and Buckley League for the 1930–31 season, playing its first competitive fixture on 30 August 1930, defeating Oakenholt St David's 5–3. The club went on to win the North Wales Junior Cup in its first season and the Flintshire Amateur League in its second.

Alexandra joined the West Cheshire Association Football League in 1937 before joining the Welsh National League Wrexham Area after the Second World War. The club remained in the division for more than 40 years. The 1980s proved to be a successful decade for the club as it won the Welsh National League on two occasions and won several regional cup competitions. As a result, Alexandra were invited to join the newly formed Cymru Alliance in 1990. In its two seasons in the league, Alexandra finished outside the top 10 on both occasions.

In 1992, the League of Wales was formed as the top tier of senior football in Wales. Alexandra was one of the 20 founding members of the league and played its first match against Inter Cardiff, losing 1–0. Alexandra was temporarily suspended from the league after failing to meet ground regulation requirements but the club was able to rectify the problems and were reinstated, finishing the season in 13th position. The club suffered financial difficulties in its following two seasons and were relegated from the League of Wales on the final day of the 1994–95 season after losing 7–3 to Ton Pentre.

The club returned to the Cymru Alliance for three seasons, but were relegated again in 1998. The club chose to drop to Division One of the Wrexham Area League, taking the place of the club's reserve side. Alexandra won promotion to the Premier Division of the regional league in its first season and returned to the Cymru Alliance in 2002. The club spent the following 15 years moving between the Cymru Alliance and the Premier Division of the Wrexham Area League.

== Women and girls section ==
In 2025, Mold Alexandra FC was sponsored by Mold-based PR and communications agency Outwrite PR.

The support was used to help develop its long-term vision of developing and growing its women and girls' football section from grassroots to competitive level.

Starting with its Girls Fun Football team for years one to six, the sponsorship saw the squad receive new official training shirts, water bottles, and drawstring bags with the company's logo. Funds were also used to buy several key pieces of equipment.

In addition, investments were made to give over-16s the opportunity to gain practical experience with the club and earn Football Association of Wales (FAW)) qualifications.

As the club grows, it also aims to form teams that can play competitively in The North East Wales FA (NEWFA) system.

Moreover, Mold Alexandra FC aims to create a recreational football group for females aged 16 and above, with the funds contributing towards 3G astroturf pitch hire.

== Current squad ==
As of 1 June 2026

Note: Flags indicate national team as defined under FIFA eligibility rules; some limited exceptions apply. Players may hold more than one non-FIFA nationality.

No.	Pos.	Nation	Player
1	GK	ENG	Joe Smith
2	DF	ENG	Matty Lewis
3	MF	WAL	James Davies
4	DF	WAL	Lucas Gregson
5	DF	ENG	Craig Rogers
6	DF	ENG	Morgan Roberts
7	FW	ENG	James Stevens
8	MF	WAL	Aidan Farren
9	FW	WAL	Owen Cordiner
11	MF	IRL	Emmanuel Lawal

No.	Pos.	Nation	Player
13	GK	WAL	Henry Green
14	MF	WAL	Charlie Davies
16	MF	WAL	Rhys Hughes
17	DF	WAL	Cynan Edwards
19	DF	ENG	Alex Smith
21	DF	ENG	Henry Nash
22	FW	WAL	Charlie Rush
23	DF	WAL	Callum Murphy

== Honours ==
- FAW Trophy
  - Winners: 2021–22
- Welsh Blood Service League Cup
  - Winners: 2023-24
- Welsh Blood Service League Cup - Northern
  - Winners: 2023-24
- Welsh National League
  - Champions: 1985–86, 1986–87, 2002–03, 2013–14
  - League Cup – Winners: 1950, 1986
  - League Cup – Finalists: 2008
  - Presidents Cup – Winners: 2008, 2013–14
- North East Wales FA Challenge Cup
  - Winners: 1986, 1987, 2015
- North Wales Coast Cup
  - Winners: 1986
- North Wales Junior Cup Winners 1930
- Ardal Northwest
  - Champions: 2021–22
- North East Wales FA Junior (Horace Wynne) Cup
  - Finalists: 2021–22

N.E.W.G.F.L League Cup Championship winners (Girls u12s) 25 - 26

== See also ==
- Category:Mold Alexandra F.C. players
