= Ebbw Vale F.C. =

Former association football club in Wales

Ebbw Vale
- Full name: Ebbw Vale Football Club
- Nickname(s): The Cowboys
- Founded: 1888, re-formed 1907
- Dissolved: 1998
- Ground: Eugene Cross Park; Ebbw Vale
- Capacity: 8,000
Home colours

Ebbw Vale Football Club (Welsh: Clwb Pêl-droed Glyn Ebwy) was a football club from Ebbw Vale, South Wales.

== History ==
Ebbw Vale played in the first season of the League of Wales in 1992–93. The club then finished 11th before finishing 3rd in two successive seasons to 1997–98. During the years when they finished 3rd the Giles brothers, Paul and David were key members of the team. The manager at the time was John Lewis.

They competed in the 1997 UEFA Intertoto Cup where they played Bastia, GAK, Hrvatski Dragovoljac, and Silkeborg. However, they were expelled from the League of Wales before the 1998–99 season began, and promptly went out of business. They played their last game against Kongsvinger in the 1998 UEFA Intertoto Cup.

A phoenix club Ebbw Vale Town F.C. was formed in 2007, and played in the North Gwent League until May 2018 when they folded.

== Colours ==
The club colours were black and amber.

== Honours ==
Southern Football League

- Champions (1): 1922–23
- Welsh Section Champions (2): 1921–22, 1922–23

Welsh Football League

- Champions (2): 1952–53, 1987–88

Welsh Cup

- Winners (1): 1925–26

Welsh League Cup

- Runner-up (1): 1996

Welsh Football League Cup

- Winners (3): 1927, 1956, 1957
- Runner-up (1): 1929

Founding Members of: South Wales Senior League, Rhymney Valley League and League of Wales

== European record ==
Season	Competition	Round	Opponent	Aggregate	1st leg	2nd leg
1997	UEFA Intertoto Cup	Group Stage	(Austria) Grazer AK		0–0 (H)	
1997	UEFA Intertoto Cup	Group Stage	(Croatia) NK Hrvatski Dragovoljac		0–4 (A)	
1997	UEFA Intertoto Cup	Group Stage	(France) SC Bastia		1–2 (H)	
1997	UEFA Intertoto Cup	Group Stage	(Denmark) Silkeborg IF		1–6 (A)	
1998	UEFA Intertoto Cup	Round 1	(Norway) Kongsvinger	1–9	1–6 (H)	0–3 (A)

== Notable former players ==
Capped players

- (Wales) David Giles
- (England) Gary Plumley
- (England) Jimmy Rollo
