= 2025 in association football =

The following are the scheduled events of association football (soccer) for the calendar year 2025 throughout the world. This includes the following:

- In countries whose league seasons fall within a single calendar year, the 2025 season.
- In countries which crown one champion in a season that spans two calendar years, the 2024–25 season.
- In countries which split their league season into two championships, a system often known in Latin America as Apertura and Clausura, all championships awarded in calendar 2025.

== Events ==
=== Men's national teams ===
==== FIFA ====
- 27 September – 19 October: 2025 FIFA U-20 World Cup in Chile
  - (gold) : Morocco
  - (silver) : Argentina
  - (bronze) : Colombia
  - 4th: France
- 3–27 November: 2025 FIFA U-17 World Cup in Qatar
  - (gold) : Portugal
  - (silver) : Austria
  - (bronze) : Italy
  - 4th: Brazil
- 1–18 December: 2025 FIFA Arab Cup in Qatar
  - (gold) : Morocco
  - (silver) : Jordan
  - (bronze) : United Arab Emirates and Saudi Arabia

==== FISU ====
- 17–28 September: 2025 FISU University World Cup Football in China
  - (gold) : (Ghana) University for Development Studies
  - (silver) : (Brazil) São Paulo State University
  - (bronze) : (Spain) University of Granada
  - 4th: (Morocco) Chouaib Doukkali University

==== AFC ====
- 12 February – 1 March: 2025 AFC U-20 Asian Cup in China
  - (gold) : Australia
  - (silver) : Saudi Arabia
- 3–20 April: 2025 AFC U-17 Asian Cup in Saudi Arabia
  - (gold) : Uzbekistan
  - (silver) : Saudi Arabia
- 23–30 October: Futsal at the 2025 Asian Youth Games in Bahrain
  - (gold) : Afghanistan
  - (silver) : Iran
  - (bronze) : Thailand
  - 4th: Uzbekistan
- 3–18 December: Football at the 2025 SEA Games – Men's tournament in Thailand
  - (gold) : Vietnam
  - (silver) : Thailand
  - (bronze) : Malaysia
  - 4th: Philippines
- 15–19 December: Futsal at the 2025 SEA Games – Men's tournament in Thailand
  - (gold) : Indonesia
  - (silver) : Thailand
  - (bronze) : Malaysia
  - 4th: Vietnam

===== AFF =====
- 8 December 2024 – 5 January: 2024 ASEAN Championship
  - (gold) : Vietnam
  - (silver) : Thailand
- 15–29 July: 2025 ASEAN U-23 Championship in Indonesia
  - (gold) : Vietnam
  - (silver) : Indonesia
  - (bronze) : Thailand
  - 4th: Philippines

===== AGCFF =====
- 28 August – 10 September: 2025 AGCFF U-20 Gulf Cup in Saudi Arabia
  - (gold) : Saudi Arabia
  - (silver) : Yemen
- 20 September – 3 October: 2025 AGCFF U-17 Gulf Cup in Qatar
  - (gold) : Saudi Arabia
  - (silver) : United Arab Emirates
- 4–16 December: 2025 AGCFF U-23 Gulf Cup in Qatar
  - (gold) : Saudi Arabia
  - (silver) : Iraq

===== CAFA =====
- 24–31 May: 2025 CAFA U-17 Championship in Uzbekistan
  - (gold) : Tajikistan
  - (silver) : Uzbekistan
  - (bronze) : Turkmenistan
  - 4th: Kyrgyzstan
- 10–17 June: 2025 CAFA U-20 Championship in Tajikistan
  - (gold) : Iran
  - (silver) : Kyrgyzstan
  - (bronze) : Tajikistan
  - 4th: Uzbekistan
- 29 August – 8 September: 2025 CAFA Nations Cup in Tajikistan and Uzbekistan
  - (gold) : Uzbekistan
  - (silver) : Iran
  - (bronze) : India
  - 4th: Oman

===== EAFF =====
- 7–15 July: 2025 EAFF E-1 Football Championship in South Korea
  - (gold) : Japan
  - (silver) : South Korea
  - (bronze) : China
  - 4th: Hong Kong

===== SAFF =====
- 9–18 May: 2025 SAFF U-19 Championship in India
  - (gold) : India
  - (silver) : Bangladesh
- 9 September: 2025 South Asian Super Cup in Sri Lanka
  - (gold) : Maldives
  - (silver) : Sri Lanka
- 15–27 September: 2025 SAFF U-17 Championship in Sri Lanka
  - (gold) : India
  - (silver) : Bangladesh

===== UAFA =====
- 21 December 2024 – 4 January: 26th Arabian Gulf Cup in Kuwait
  - (gold) : Bahrain
  - (silver) : Oman

===== WAFF =====
- 19–25 March: 2025 WAFF U-23 Championship in Oman
  - (gold) : Oman
  - (silver) : Jordan
  - (bronze) : Syria
  - 4th: Bahrain
- 27 October – 4 November: 2025 WAFF U-17 Championship in Jordan
  - (gold) : Saudi Arabia
  - (silver) : Lebanon
- 3–11 November: Futsal at the 2025 Islamic Solidarity Games in Saudi Arabia
  - (gold) : Iran
  - (silver) : Morocco
  - (bronze) : Uzbekistan
  - 4th: Saudi Arabia

==== CAF ====
- 30 March – 19 April: 2025 U-17 Africa Cup of Nations in Morocco
  - (gold) : Morocco
  - (silver) : Mali
  - (bronze) : Ivory Coast
  - 4th: Burkina Faso
- 27 April – 18 May: 2025 U-20 Africa Cup of Nations in Egypt
  - (gold) : South Africa
  - (silver) : Morocco
  - (bronze) : Nigeria
  - 4th: Egypt
- 2–30 August: 2024 African Nations Championship in Kenya, Tanzania, Uganda
  - (gold) : Morocco
  - (silver) : Madagascar
  - (bronze) : Senegal
  - 4th: Sudan
- 21 December 2025 – 18 January 2026: 2025 Africa Cup of Nations in Morocco
  - (gold) : Morocco
  - (silver) : Senegal
  - (bronze) : Nigeria
  - 4th: Egypt

===== COSAFA =====
- 4 – 15 June: 2025 COSAFA Cup in South Africa
  - (gold) : Angola
  - (silver) : South Africa
  - (bronze) : Comoros
  - 4th: Madagascar
- 4 – 13 July: 2025 COSAFA U-20 Championship in Namibia
  - (gold) : South Africa
  - (silver) : Malawi
  - (bronze) : Zambia
  - 4th: Angola

===== WAFU =====
- 10–23 July: 2025 WAFU Zone B U20 Boys Cup in Ghana
  - (gold) : Ivory Coast
  - (silver) : Nigeria
  - (bronze) : Ghana
  - 4th: Niger

==== CONCACAF ====
- 20–23 March: 2025 CONCACAF Nations League Finals in the United States
  - (gold) : Mexico
  - (silver) : Panama
  - (bronze) : Canada
  - 4th: United States
- 14 June – 6 July: 2025 CONCACAF Gold Cup in the United States and Canada
  - (gold) : Mexico
  - (silver) : United States
- 2–10 August: 2025 CONCACAF Boys' Under-15 Championship in Aruba, Costa Rica and Curaçao
  - (gold) : Mexico
  - (silver) : United States
  - (bronze) : Costa Rica
  - 4th: Panama

===== UNCAF =====
- 1–8 October: 2025 UNCAF U-16 Tournament in Guatemala
  - (gold) : Costa Rica
  - (silver) : Guatemala
  - (bronze) : Honduras
  - 4th: Nicaragua
- 20–29 October: Football at the 2025 Central American Games in Guatemala
  - (gold) : Costa Rica
  - (silver) : Panama
  - (bronze) : Guatemala
  - 4th: El Salvador
- 25–29 October: Futsal at the 2025 Central American Games in Guatemala
  - (gold) : Panama
  - (silver) : Costa Rica
  - (bronze) : Guatemala
  - 4th: El Salvador
- 5–11 December: 2025 UNCAF U-19 Tournament in Panama
  - (gold) : Costa Rica
  - (silver) : Panama
  - (bronze) : Honduras
  - 4th: Guatemala

==== CONMEBOL ====
- 23 January – 16 February: 2025 South American U-20 Championship in Venezuela
  - (gold) : Brazil
  - (silver) : Argentina
  - (bronze) : Colombia
  - 4th: Paraguay
- 27 March – 12 April : 2025 South American U-17 Championship in Colombia
  - (gold) : Brazil
  - (silver) : Colombia
  - (bronze) : Venezuela
  - 4th: Chile
- 22–26 October: 2025 CONMEBOL Futsal Liga Evolución (South) in Paraguay
  - (gold) : Argentina
  - (silver) : Paraguay
  - (bronze) : Chile
  - 4th: Bolivia
- 12–16 November: 2025 CONMEBOL Futsal Liga Evolución (North) in Venezuela
  - (gold) : Brazil
  - (silver) : Venezuela
  - (bronze) : Colombia
  - 4th: Peru
- 29 November – 3 December: Futsal at 2025 Bolivarian Games in Peru
  - (gold) : Paraguay
  - (silver) : Panama
  - (bronze) : Colombia
  - 4th: Venezuela

==== OFC ====
- 15–30 August: 2025 OFC U-16 Men's Championship in Solomon Islands
  - (gold) : New Zealand
  - (silver) : New Caledonia
  - (bronze) : Fiji
  - 4th: Papua New Guinea
- 20–24 September: 2025 OFC Futsal Cup in Solomon Islands
  - (gold) : Solomon Islands
  - (silver) : New Zealand
  - (bronze) : Fiji
  - 4th: Vanuatu

==== UEFA ====
- 4–8 June: 2025 UEFA Nations League Finals in Germany
  - (gold) : Portugal
  - (silver) : Spain
  - (bronze) : France
  - 4th: Germany
- 19 May – 1 June: 2025 UEFA European Under-17 Championship in Albania
  - (gold) : Portugal
  - (silver) : France
- 11–28 June: 2025 UEFA European Under-21 Championship in Slovakia
  - (gold) : England
  - (silver) : Germany
- 13–26 June: 2025 UEFA European Under-19 Championship in Romania
  - (gold) : Netherlands
  - (silver) : Spain
- 17–25 July: 2025 European Universities Futsal Championship in (Croatia) Zagreb
  - (gold) : Azerbaijan Football Academy
  - (silver) : (Spain) University of Valencia
  - (bronze) : (Spain) University of Castilla–La Mancha
  - 4th: (Poland) University of Warsaw
- 27 July – 3 August: 2025 European Universities Football Championships in (Italy) Camerino
  - (gold) : (Romania) West University of Timișoara
  - (silver) : (Spain) University of Granada
  - (bronze) : (France) University of Rouen Normandy
  - 4th: (Turkey) Ege University
- 28 September – 5 October: 2025 UEFA Under-19 Futsal Championship in (Moldova) Chișinău
  - (gold) : Portugal
  - (silver) : Spain

=== Men's futsal competitions ===
- 9–12 January: 2025 Futsal Week U19 Winter Cup in (Croatia) Poreč
  - (gold) : Romania
  - (silver) : Montenegro
  - (bronze) : Malta
  - 4th: San Marino
- 21–25 January: 2025 Istria Nations Cup in (Croatia) Umag and Novigrad
  - (gold) : France
  - (silver) : Slovenia
  - (bronze) : Ukraine
  - 4th: Italy
- 30 January – 2 February: 2025 Futsal 4 Nations World Series in Indonesia
  - (gold) : Argentina
  - (silver) : Indonesia
  - (bronze) : Japan
  - 4th: Saudi Arabia
- 17–19 February: 2025 3 Nations Challenge in Las Rozas de Madrid
  - (gold) : Spain
  - (silver) : Japan
  - (bronze) : Portugal
- 5–9 March: 2025 Copa Intercontinental de Seleções in São José dos Pinhais
  - (gold) : Brazil
  - (silver) : Iran
  - (bronze) : Afghanistan
  - 4th: Greenland
- 3–5 April: 2025 CFA International Futsal Tournament in Yulin
  - (gold) : Uzbekistan
  - (silver) : China
- 11–13 April: 2025 International Futsal Challenge in (Morocco) Rabat
  - (gold) : Russia
  - (silver) : Iran
  - (bronze) : Thailand
  - 4th: Kuwait
- 12–13 April: 2024 CONMEBOL Futsal Evolution League (finals) in (Paraguay) Luque
  - (gold) : Brazil
  - (silver) : Argentina
- 28–30 April: 2025 Torneio Las Rozas Sub-17 Futsal in Las Rozas de Madrid
  - (gold) : Portugal
  - (silver) : Spain
  - (bronze) : France
- 18–21 June: 2025 Futsal Week June Cup in (Croatia) Poreč
  - (gold) : France
  - (silver) : Netherlands
  - (bronze) : Montenegro
  - 4th: Kyrgyzstan
- 24–28 June: 2025 Futsal Week U-19 Cup in (Croatia) Poreč
  - (gold) : Portugal
  - (silver) : Spain
  - (bronze) : Italy
  - 4th: Ukraine
- 29 July – 3 August: 2025 Continental Futsal Championships in Thailand
  - (gold) : Thailand
  - (silver) : Saudi Arabia
  - (bronze) : Belarus
  - 4th: Chinese Taipei
- 5–11 September: 2025 Shijiazhuang International Futsal Tournament in China
  - (gold) : Indonesia
  - (silver) : Denmark
  - (bronze) : South Korea
  - 4th: Myanmar
- 17–21 September: 2025 Copa das Nações de Futsal in Brazil
  - (gold) : Brazil
  - (silver) : Poland
  - (bronze) : Paraguay
  - 4th: France
- 18–21 September: 2025 Futsal Week September Cup in Croatia
  - (gold) : Montenegro
  - (silver) : San Marino
  - (bronze) : Estonia
  - 4th: Malta
- 18–21 September: 2025 Four Nations World Series in Indonesia
  - (gold) : Latvia
  - (silver) : Indonesia
  - (bronze) : Netherlands
  - 4th: Tanzania
- 19–21 October: 2025 Triangular Internacional in Argentina
  - (gold) : Argentina
  - (silver) : Morocco
  - (bronze) : Chile
- 19–21 October: 2025 Three Nations Tournament in Poland
  - (gold) : Poland
  - (silver) : Serbia
  - (bronze) : Netherlands
- 30 October – 1 November: 2025 Montaigu Futsal Cup Aquila RH' in France
  - (gold) : France
  - (silver) : Croatia
  - (bronze) : Morocco
- 6–9 November: 2025 Festival Dakar En Jeux in Senegal
  - (gold) : Brazil
  - (silver) : Portugal
  - (bronze) : Morocco
  - 4th: Senegal
- 8–11 November: 2025 International Futsal Challenge in Romania
  - (gold) : Latvia
  - (silver) : Romania
  - (bronze) : Malta
- 17–19 November: 2025 Three Nations Tournament UNDER 17 in Spain
  - (gold) : Spain
  - (silver) : Kyrgyzstan
  - (bronze) : Portugal
- 3–5 December: 2025 Futsal Love Serbia - U19 Autumn Cup in Serbia
  - (gold) : France
  - (silver) : Serbia
  - (bronze) : Hungary
- 17–20 December: 2025 Christmas International Futsal Tournament in Czech Republic
  - (gold) : Czech Republic
  - (silver) : Lithuania
  - (bronze) : Kosovo
  - 4th: Latvia
- 17–21 December: 2025 Futsal Week December Cup in Croatia
  - (gold) : Poland
  - (silver) : Japan
  - (bronze) : Saudi Arabia
  - 4th: Slovenia
- 19–21 December: 2025 3 Nations Challenge in Estonia
  - (gold) : Finland
  - (silver) : Estonia
  - (bronze) : Gibraltar
- 19–21 December: 2025 4 Nations Tournament in France
  - (gold) : France
  - (silver) : Paraguay
  - (bronze) : Croatia
  - 4th: Colombia
- 21–24 December: 2025 Unibank Cup in Armenia
  - (gold) : Armenia
  - (silver) : Georgia
  - (bronze) : Kyrgyzstan
  - 4th: Moldova

==== World competitions ====
- 3–13 January: 2025 Mapinduzi Cup in Chake-Chake
  - (gold) : Zanzibar
  - (silver) : Burkina Faso
  - (bronze) : Kenya
  - 4th: Tanzania
- 10–14 February: 2025 Antalya Youth Cup in (Turkey) Antalya
  - (gold) : Morocco
  - (silver) : Czech Republic
  - (bronze) : Slovakia
  - 4th: Uzbekistan
- 5 September 2024 – 25 March 2025: 2024–25 Under 20 Elite League
  - (gold) : Germany
  - (silver) : England
  - (bronze) : Italy
  - 4th: Portugal
- 14–21 April: 2025 Montaigu Tournament in France
  - (gold) : France
  - (silver) : Portugal
  - (bronze) : Mexico
  - 4th: China
- 18–22 May: 2025 FIFA Youth Series in Switzerland
  - (gold) : Paraguay
  - (silver) : New Zealand
  - (bronze) : Switzerland
  - 4th: Tunisia
- 23–25 May: 2025 Pelican Cup in (Collectivity of Saint Martin) Saint Martin
  - (gold) : Saint Martin
  - (silver) : Saint Kitts and Nevis
  - (bronze) : Anguilla
- 27–31 May: 2025 Unity Cup in England
  - (gold) : Nigeria
  - (silver) : Jamaica
  - (bronze) : Ghana
  - 4th: Trinidad and Tobago
- 1–10 June: 2025 U18 UEFA Friendship Cup in Switzerland
  - (gold) : United States
  - (silver) : Portugal
  - (bronze) : France
  - 4th: Japan
- 3–15 June: 2025 Maurice Revello Tournament in France
  - (gold) : France
  - (silver) : Saudi Arabia
  - (bronze) : Denmark
  - 4th: Mexico
- 4–8 June: 2025 U-16 International Dream Cup in Japan
  - (gold) : Japan
  - (silver) : France
  - (bronze) : Ivory Coast
  - 4th: Colombia
- 6–10 June: 2025 Under-19 Baltic Cup
  - (gold) : Latvia
  - (silver) : Lithuania
  - (bronze) : Estonia
- 7–10 June: 2025 Canadian Shield in Canada
  - (gold) : Canada
  - (silver) : New Zealand
  - (bronze) : Ukraine
  - 4th: Ivory Coast
- 25–29 June: 2025 Under-17 Baltic Cup
  - (gold) : Latvia
  - (silver) : Finland
  - (bronze) : Lithuania
  - 4th: Estonia
- 4–7 July: 2025 Shenyang Peace Cup in China
  - (gold) : South Korea
  - (silver) : Japan
  - (bronze) : China
  - 4th: Uzbekistan
- 9–13 July: 2025 Lion City Cup in Singapore
  - (gold) : Philippines
  - (silver) : Singapore
  - (bronze) : Hong Kong
  - 4th: Cambodia
- 13–18 July: 2025 Island Games in Orkney
  - (gold) : Bermuda
  - (silver) : Ynys Môn
  - (bronze) : Isle of Man
  - 4th: Jersey
- 19–24 July: U16 CPLP Games in Timor-Leste
  - (gold) : Cape Verde
  - (silver) : Angola
  - (bronze) : Portugal
  - 4th: Timor-Leste
- 1–9 August: 2025 2025 CISOI Games in Seychelles
  - (gold) : Réunion
  - (silver) : Madagascar
  - (bronze) : Mauritius
  - 4th: Mayotte
- 12–16 August: 2025 Telki Cup in Hungary
  - (gold) : Iceland
  - (silver) : Turkey
  - (bronze) : Republic of Ireland
  - 4th: Hungary
- 14–18 August: 2025 Indonesian Independence Cup in Indonesia
  - (gold) : Mali
  - (silver) : Indonesia
  - (bronze) : Tajikistan
  - 4th: Uzbekistan
- 26–31 August: 2025 Gary Speed Cup in Wales
  - (gold) : Northern Ireland
  - (silver) : Japan
  - (bronze) : Wales
  - 4th: Gibraltar
- 3–7 September: 2025 Václav Ježek Tournament in Czech Republic
  - (gold) : Switzerland
  - (silver) : Czech Republic
  - (bronze) : Turkey
  - 4th: Slovakia
- 3–7 September: 2025 Lafarge Foot Avenir in France
  - (gold) : Japan
  - (silver) : Portugal
  - (bronze) : France
  - 4th: Saudi Arabia
- 3–9 September: 2025 Slovenia Nations Cup in Slovenia
  - (gold) : Slovenia
  - (silver) : Poland
  - (bronze) : Iceland
  - 4th: Kazakhstan
- 4–7 September: 2025 King's Cup in Thailand
  - (gold) : Iraq
  - (silver) : Thailand
  - (bronze) : Hong Kong
  - 4th: Fiji
- 4–9 September: 2025 Syrenka Cup in Poland
  - (gold) : Poland
  - (silver) : Albania
  - (bronze) : Norway
  - 4th: Romania
- 4–9 September: 2025 Memorial Stevan Vilotić - Ćele in Serbia
  - (gold) : Serbia
  - (silver) : Portugal
  - (bronze) : Hungary
  - 4th: Montenegro
- 27 September – 4 October: 2025 CIS Games in Azerbaijan
  - (gold) : Russia
  - (silver) : Azerbaijan
  - (bronze) : Belarus
  - 4th: Tajikistan
- 11–23 November: 2025 MSG Prime Minister's Cup – Men's tournament in Papua New Guinea
  - (gold) : Vanuatu
  - (silver) : Papua New Guinea Gold
  - (bronze) : Fiji and Solomon Islands
- 12–18 November: 2025 Manas Cup in Kyrgyzstan
  - (gold) : Russia
  - (silver) : Kyrgyzstan
  - (bronze) : Iran
  - 4th: Bahrain
- 12–18 November: 2025 Panda Cup in China
  - (gold) : South Korea
  - (silver) : China
  - (bronze) : Uzbekistan
  - 4th: Vietnam
- 13–18 November: 2025 Al Ain International Cup in the United Arab Emirates
  - (gold) : Uzbekistan
  - (silver) : Iran
  - (bronze) : Egypt
  - 4th: Cape Verde
- 16–20 December: 2025 UC Cup in Chile
  - (gold) :
  - (silver) :
  - (bronze) : Peru
  - 4th: Colombia

=== Men's beach soccer competitions ===
==== FIFA ====
- 1–11 May: 2025 FIFA Beach Soccer World Cup in Seychelles
  - (gold) : Brazil
  - (silver) : Belarus
  - (bronze) : Portugal
  - 4th: Senegal

=== Women's national teams ===
==== FIFA ====
- 17 October – 8 November: 2025 FIFA U-17 Women's World Cup in Morocco
  - (gold) : North Korea
  - (silver) : Netherlands
  - (bronze) : Mexico
  - 4th: Brazil

==== FISU ====
- 17–28 September: 2025 FISU University World Cup Football in China
  - (gold) : (China) Shanghai University of Sport
  - (silver) : (Canada) Université Laval
  - (bronze) : (China) Beijing Normal University
  - 4th: (Brazil) Universidade do Extremo Sul Catarinense

==== AFC ====
- 23–30 October: Futsal at the 2025 Asian Youth Games in Bahrain
  - (gold) : Iran
  - (silver) : China
  - (bronze) : Chinese Taipei
  - 4th: Hong Kong
- 4–17 December: Football at the 2025 SEA Games – Women's tournament in Thailand
  - (gold) : Philippines
  - (silver) : Vietnam
  - (bronze) : Thailand
  - 4th: Indonesia
- 15–19 December: Futsal at the 2025 SEA Games – Men's tournament in Thailand
  - (gold) : Vietnam
  - (silver) : Indonesia
  - (bronze) : Thailand
  - 4th: Philippines

===== AFF =====
- 9–18 June: 2025 ASEAN U-19 Women's Championship in Vietnam
  - (gold) : Thailand
  - (silver) : Vietnam
  - (bronze) : Indonesia
  - 4th: Myanmar
- 6–19 August: 2025 ASEAN Women's Championship in Vietnam
  - (gold) : Australia
  - (silver) : Myanmar
  - (bronze) : Vietnam
  - 4th: Thailand
- 20–29 August: 2025 ASEAN U-16 Women's Championship in Indonesia
  - (gold) : Australia
  - (silver) : Thailand
  - (bronze) : Vietnam
  - 4th: Indonesia

===== CAFA =====
- 4–8 March: 2025 CAFA U-17 Women's Championship in Tajikistan
  - (gold) : Uzbekistan
  - (silver) : Iran
  - (bronze) : Kyrgyzstan
  - 4th: Tajikistan
- 22–29 November: 2025 CAFA U-18 Women's Championship in Uzbekistan
  - (gold) : Uzbekistan
  - (silver) : Kyrgyzstan
  - (bronze) : Iran
  - 4th: Tajikistan

===== EAFF =====
- 9–16 July: 2025 EAFF E-1 Football Championship (women) in South Korea
  - (gold) : South Korea
  - (silver) : China
  - (bronze) : Japan
  - 4th: Chinese Taipei

===== SAFF =====
- 11–21 July: 2025 SAFF U-20 Women's Championship in Bangladesh
  - (gold) : Bangladesh
  - (silver) : Nepal
  - (bronze) : Bhutan
  - 4th: Sri Lanka
- 20–31 August: 2025 SAFF U-17 Women's Championship in Bhutan
  - (gold) : India
  - (silver) : Bangladesh
  - (bronze) : Nepal
  - 4th: Bhutan

===== WAFF =====
- 8–16 February: 2025 WAFF U-17 Girls Championship in Saudi Arabia
  - (gold) : Lebanon
  - (silver) : Syria
  - (bronze) : Jordan
  - 4th: Bahrain
- 6–12 April: 2025 WAFF U-20 Girls Championship in Jordan
  - (gold) : Palestine
  - (silver) : Jordan
  - (bronze) : Syria
  - 4th: Kuwait
- 24 November – 2 December: 2025 WAFF Women's Championship in Saudi Arabia
  - (gold) : Jordan
  - (silver) : Palestine
  - (bronze) : Iraq
  - 4th: Saudi Arabia
- 5–13 December: 2025 WAFF U-14 Girls Championship in Saudi Arabia
  - (gold) : Jordan
  - (silver) : Lebanon
  - (bronze) : Palestine
  - 4th: Saudi Arabia

===== UNAF =====
- 26 November – 2 December: 2025 UNAF U-20 Women's Tournament in Tunisia
  - (gold) : Morocco
  - (silver) : Egypt
  - (bronze) : Tunisia
  - 4th: Algeria

==== CAF ====
- 5–26 July: 2024 Women's Africa Cup of Nations in Morocco
  - (gold) : Nigeria
  - (silver) : Morocco
  - (bronze) : Ghana
  - 4th: South Africa

===== CECAFA =====
- 13–21 June: 2025 CECAFA Women's Championship in Tanzania
  - (gold) : Tanzania
  - (silver) : Kenya
  - (bronze) : Uganda
  - 4th: Burundi

===== COSAFA =====
- 10–17 May: 2025 COSAFA U-17 Girls' Championship in (Namibia) Windhoek
  - (gold) : Zambia
  - (silver) : Malawi
  - (bronze) : Mozambique
  - 4th: Zimbabwe
- 4 – 13 July: 2025 COSAFA U-20 Women's Championship in Namibia
  - (gold) : Zambia
  - (silver) : South Africa
  - (bronze) : Botswana
  - 4th: Namibia

===== WAFU =====
- 22–31 May: 2025 WAFU Zone A Women's Cup in Mauritania
  - (gold) : Sierra Leone
  - (silver) : Senegal
  - (bronze) : Liberia
  - 4th: Mali
- 7–12 November: 2025 WAFU Zone B U-20 Women's Cup in Benin
  - (gold) : Nigeria
  - (silver) : Ghana
  - (bronze) : Benin

==== CONCACAF ====
- 29 May–8 June: 2025 CONCACAF Women's U-20 Championship in Costa Rica
  - (gold) : Canada
  - (silver) : Mexico

===== UNCAF =====
- 23– November: 2025 UNCAF FIFA Forward U-16 Girls Championship in Nicaragua
  - (gold) : Puerto Rico
  - (silver) : El Salvador
  - (bronze) : Costa Rica
  - 4th: Guatemala

==== CFU ====
- 15–24 August: 2025 U-14 Challenge Series Girls in Trinidad and Tobago
  - (gold) : Puerto Rico
  - (silver) : Dominican Republic
- 20–29 October: Football at the 2025 Central American Games in Guatemala
  - (gold) : Costa Rica
  - (silver) : El Salvador
  - (bronze) : Guatemala
  - 4th: Nicaragua
- 25–27 October: Futsal at the 2025 Central American Games in Guatemala
  - (gold) : Guatemala
  - (silver) : Panama
  - (bronze) : Nicaragua

==== CONMEBOL ====
- 30 April–24 May: 2025 South American U-17 Women's Championship in Colombia
  - (gold) : Paraguay
  - (silver) : Brazil
  - (bronze) : Ecuador
  - 4th: Colombia
- 12 July–2 August: 2025 Copa América Femenina in Ecuador
  - (gold) : Brazil
  - (silver) : Colombia
  - (bronze) : Argentina
  - 4th: Uruguay

==== OFC ====
- 4–19 July: 2025 OFC Women's Nations Cup in Fiji
  - (gold) : Solomon Islands
  - (silver) : Papua New Guinea
  - (bronze) : Samoa
  - 4th: Fiji
- 1–14 August: 2025 OFC U-16 Women's Championship in Samoa
  - (gold) : New Zealand
  - (silver) : Samoa
  - (bronze) : New Caledonia
  - 4th: Solomon Islands
- 21 September – 4 October: 2025 OFC U-19 Women's Championship in Tahiti
  - (gold) : New Zealand
  - (silver) : New Caledonia
  - (bronze) : Fiji
  - 4th: Cook Islands

==== UEFA ====
- 21 February – 2 December: 2025 UEFA Women's Nations League
  - (gold) : Spain
  - (silver) : Germany
  - (bronze) : France
  - 4th: Sweden
- 2–27 July: UEFA Women's Euro 2025 in Switzerland
  - (gold) : England
  - (silver) : Spain
- 15–27 June: 2025 UEFA Women's Under-19 Championship in Poland
  - (gold) : Spain
  - (silver) : France
- 4–17 May: 2025 UEFA Women's Under-17 Championship in Faroe Islands
  - (gold) : Netherlands
  - (silver) : Norway
- 17–25 July: 2025 European Universities Futsal Championship in (Croatia) Zagreb
  - (gold) : (Ukraine) National Pedagogical Drahomanov University
  - (silver) : (Spain) University of Barcelona
  - (bronze) : (Spain) King Juan Carlos University
  - 4th: (France) Nantes University
- 27 July – 3 August: 2025 European Universities Football Championships in (Italy) Camerino
  - (gold) : (Germany) University of Würzburg
  - (silver) : (Germany) Goethe University Frankfurt
  - (bronze) : (Ukraine) Pavlo Tychyna Uman State Pedagogical University
  - 4th: (France) University of Montpellier

==== World competitions ====
- 24 October 2024 – 7 April 2025: 2024–25 European U23 League
  - (gold) : Germany
  - (silver) : Norway
  - (bronze) : Netherlands
  - 4th: Italy
- 11–15 February: 2025 MIMA Cup in Spain
  - (gold) : England
  - (silver) : Mexico
  - (bronze) : Sweden
  - 4th: Canada
- 17–25 February: 2025 International Women's Championship in Nepal
  - (gold) : Myanmar
  - (silver) : Nepal
  - (bronze) : Lebanon
  - 4th: Kyrgyzstan
- 19–25 February: 2025 Pinatar Cup in Spain
  - (gold) : Canada
  - (silver) : Mexico
  - (bronze) : China
  - 4th: Chinese Taipei
- 19–26 February: 2025 Pink Ladies Cup in the United Arab Emirates
  - (gold) : South Korea
  - (silver) : Russia
  - (bronze) : Uzbekistan
  - 4th: India
- 19–25 February: 2025 PacificAus Four Nations Tournament in Australia
  - (gold) : Australia
  - (silver) : Thailand
  - (bronze) : Vanuatu
  - 4th: Solomon Islands
- 20–26 February: 2025 SheBelieves Cup in the United States
  - (gold) : Japan
  - (silver) : United States
  - (bronze) : Colombia
  - 4th: Australia
- 31 March – 9 April: 2025 Women's U18 UEFA Friendship Cup in Turkey
  - (gold) : Colombia
  - (silver) : Finland
  - (bronze) : Tanzania
  - 4th: Zambia
- 5–8 April: 2025 Yongchuan International Tournament in China
  - (gold) : China
  - (silver) : Thailand
  - (bronze) : Zambia
  - 4th: Uzbekistan
- 14–20 April: 2025 Montaigu Tournament in France
  - (gold) : Japan
  - (silver) : China
  - (bronze) : France
  - 4th: Mexico
- 27 May – 3 June: 2025 Sud Ladies Cup in France
  - (gold) : France
  - (silver) : Japan
  - (bronze) : Czech Republic
  - 4th: Morocco
- 28 May – 3 June: 2025 Nations Challenge in South Africa
  - (gold) : South Africa
  - (silver) : Zambia
  - (bronze) : Botswana
- 28 May – 3 June: 2025 Women's Tri-Nation Cup in Bhutan
  - (gold) : Hong Kong
  - (silver) : Malaysia
  - (bronze) : Bhutan
- 2–7 July: 2025 Women's Under-17 Baltic Cup
  - (gold) : Latvia
  - (silver) : Lithuania
  - (bronze) : Faroe Islands
  - 4th: Estonia
- 8–12 July: 2025 Women's Lion City Cup in Singapore
  - (gold) : South Korea
  - (silver) : Singapore
  - (bronze) : Hong Kong
  - 4th: Cambodia
- 13–18 July: 2025 Island Games in Orkney
  - (gold) : Bermuda
  - (silver) : Isle of Man
  - (bronze) : Western Isles
  - 4th: Gozo
- 14–20 September: 2025 Windward Islands Tournament in Saint Vincent and the Grenadines
  - (gold) : Barbados
  - (silver) : Saint Lucia
  - (bronze) : Saint Vincent and the Grenadines
  - 4th: Dominica
- 25–29 September: 2025 Women's U19 Baltic Cup
  - (gold) : Lithuania
  - (silver) : Latvia
  - (bronze) : Estonia
- 21–25 October: 2025 Women's Slovenia Cup in Slovenia
  - (gold) : Poland
  - (silver) : Croatia
  - (bronze) : Slovenia
- 26 October – 1 November: 2025 FIFA Unites Women's Series in Morocco
  - (gold) : Chad
  - (silver) : Tunisia
  - (bronze) : Afghanistan
  - 4th: Libya
- 24–27 October: 2025 Women's Baltic Cup
  - (gold) : Latvia
  - (silver) : Lithuania
  - (bronze) : Estonia
  - 4th: Faroe Islands
- 11–23 November: 2025 MSG Prime Minister's Cup Women in Papua New Guinea
  - (gold) : Papua New Guinea Gold
  - (silver) : Fiji
  - (bronze) : Vanuatu
  - 4th: Solomon Islands
- 22–24 November: 2025 Eswatini Three Women's Tournament in Eswatini
  - (gold) : Mozambique
  - (silver) : Eswatini
  - (bronze) : Lesotho
- 26 November 2 December: 2025 Indonesia Women's Tri-Nation Cup in Indonesia
  - (gold) : Chinese Taipei
  - (silver) : Indonesia
  - (bronze) : Nepal
- 26 November – 2 December: 2025 Bangladesh Tri-Nations Cup in Bangladesh
  - (gold) : Azerbaijan
  - (silver) : Malaysia
  - (bronze) : Bangladesh
- 26 November – 2 December: 2025 Bosnia and Herzegovina Tri-Nations Cup in Bosnia and Herzegovina
  - (gold) : Greece
  - (silver) : Belarus
  - (bronze) : Bosnia and Herzegovina
- 28 November – 2 December: 2025 Malawi Tri-Nations Cup in Malawi
  - (gold) : Zambia
  - (silver) : Zimbabwe
  - (bronze) : Malawi
- 16–20 December: 2025 WIFA Girls U17 Tournament in Grenada
  - (gold) : Grenada
  - (silver) : Saint Vincent and the Grenadines
  - (bronze) : Grenada

=== Women's futsal competitions ===
==== FIFA ====
- 21 November – 7 December: 2025 FIFA Futsal Women's World Cup in Philippines
  - (gold) : Brazil
  - (silver) : Portugal
  - (bronze) : Spain
  - 4th: Argentina

==== AFC ====
- 7–18 May: 2025 AFC Women's Futsal Asian Cup in China
  - (gold) : Japan
  - (silver) : Thailand
  - (bronze) : Iran
  - 4th: China

===== CAFA =====
- 9–16 February: 2025 CAFA Women's Futsal Championship in Tajikistan
  - (gold) : Iran
  - (silver) : Uzbekistan
  - (bronze) : Kyrgyzstan
  - 4th: Turkmenistan

==== CAF ====
- 22–30 April: 2025 Women's Futsal Africa Cup of Nations in Morocco
  - (gold) : Morocco
  - (silver) : Tanzania
  - (bronze) : Cameroon
  - 4th: Angola

==== CONCACAF ====
- 28 April – 4 May: 2025 CONCACAF Women's Futsal Championship in Guatemala
  - (gold) : Canada
  - (silver) : Panama

==== CONMEBOL ====
- 22–30 March: 2025 Copa América de Futsal Femenina in Brazil
  - (gold) : Brazil
  - (silver) : Argentina
  - (bronze) : Colombia
  - 4th: Paraguay

=== Women's International futsal competitions ===
- 11–13 February: 2025 Three Nations Futsal Women's Tournament in Vila do Conde
  - (gold) : Poland
  - (silver) : Portugal
  - (bronze) : Morocco
- 5–7 April: 2025 SAT Women's Futsal Championship in Nakhon Ratchasima
  - (gold) : Japan
  - (silver) : Iran
  - (bronze) : Thailand
  - 4th: Uzbekistan
- 18–22 June: 2025 Futsal Week Women's June Cup in Poreč
  - (gold) : Poland
  - (silver) : Czech Republic
  - (bronze) : Morocco
  - 4th: Croatia
- 20–24 August: 2025 Torneo Internacional de Futsal Femenino de Xanxerê in Brazil
  - (gold) : Brazil
  - (silver) : Colombia
  - (bronze) : Morocco
  - 4th: Guatemala
- 6–9 November: 2025 Festival Dakar En Jeux in Senegal
  - (gold) : Senegal A
  - (silver) : Guinea
  - (bronze) : Senegal B
  - 4th: Namibia
- 11–15 November: 2025 SAT Women’s Futsal Championship in Thailand
  - (gold) : Brazil
  - (silver) : Thailand
  - (bronze) : New Zealand

== Club continental champions ==
=== Men ===
| Region | Tournament | Defending champion | Champion | Title | Last honour |
|---|---|---|---|---|---|
| AFC (Asia) | 2024–25 AFC Champions League Elite | (United Arab Emirates) Al Ain | (Saudi Arabia) Al-Ahli | 1st | —N/a |
| AFC (Asia) | 2024–25 AFC Champions League Two | (Australia) Central Coast Mariners | (United Arab Emirates) Sharjah | 1st | —N/a |
| AFC (Asia) | 2024–25 AFC Challenge League | (Turkmenistan) HTTU Aşgabat (2014) | (Turkmenistan) Arkadag | 1st | —N/a |
| AFC (Asia) | 2024–25 ASEAN Club Championship | (Singapore) Tampines Rovers (2005) | (Thailand) Buriram United | 1st | —N/a |
| CAF (Africa) | 2024–25 CAF Champions League | (Egypt) Al Ahly | (Egypt) Pyramids | 1st | —N/a |
| CAF (Africa) | 2024–25 CAF Confederation Cup | (Egypt) Zamalek | (Morocco) RS Berkane | 3rd | 2021–22 |
| CAF (Africa) | 2025 CAF Super Cup | (Egypt) Zamalek | (Egypt) Pyramids | 1st | —N/a |
| CECAFA | 2025 Kagame Interclub Cup | (Zambia) Red Arrows | (Tanzania) Singida Black Stars | 1st | —N/a |
| CONCACAF (North and Central America, Caribbean) | 2025 CONCACAF Champions Cup | (Mexico) Pachuca | (Mexico) Cruz Azul | 7th | 2013–14 |
| CONCACAF (North and Central America, Caribbean) | 2025 Leagues Cup | (United States) Columbus Crew | (United States) Seattle Sounders | 1st | —N/a |
| CONCACAF (North and Central America, Caribbean) | 2025 CONCACAF Central American Cup | (Costa Rica) Alajuelense | (Costa Rica) Alajuelense | 3rd | 2024 |
| CONCACAF (North and Central America, Caribbean) | 2025 CONCACAF Caribbean Cup | (Jamaica) Cavalier | (Jamaica) Mount Pleasant | 1st | —N/a |
| CONCACAF (North and Central America, Caribbean) | 2025 CFU Club Shield | (Jamaica) Arnett Gardens | (Dominican Republic) Moca | 1st | —N/a |
| CONMEBOL (South America) | 2025 Copa Libertadores | (Brazil) Botafogo | (Brazil) Flamengo | 4th | 2022 |
| CONMEBOL (South America) | 2025 Copa Sudamericana | (Argentina) Racing | (Argentina) Lanús | 2nd | 2013 |
| CONMEBOL (South America) | 2025 Recopa Sudamericana | (Brazil) Fluminense | (Argentina) Racing | 1st | —N/a |
| CONMEBOL (South America) | 2025 U-20 Copa Libertadores | (Brazil) Flamengo | (Brazil) Flamengo | 2nd | 2024 |
| CONMEBOL (South America) | 2025 Copa Libertadores de Futsal | (Brazil) Magnus Futsal | (Uruguay) Penarol | 1st | —N/a |
| OFC (Oceania) | 2025 OFC Champions League | (New Zealand) Auckland City | (New Zealand) Auckland City | 13th | 2024 |
| OFC (Oceania) | 2025 OFC Futsal Men's Champions League | (New Caledonia) AS PTT | (Solomon Islands) Mataks FC | 1st | —N/a |
| UEFA (Europe) | 2024–25 UEFA Champions League | (Spain) Real Madrid | (France) Paris Saint-Germain | 1st | —N/a |
| UEFA (Europe) | 2024–25 UEFA Europa League | (Italy) Atalanta | (England) Tottenham Hotspur | 3rd | 1983–84 |
| UEFA (Europe) | 2024–25 UEFA Conference League | (Greece) Olympiacos | (England) Chelsea | 1st | —N/a |
| UEFA (Europe) | 2025 UEFA Super Cup | (Spain) Real Madrid | (France) Paris Saint-Germain | 1st | —N/a |
| UEFA (Europe) | 2024–25 UEFA Youth League | (Greece) Olympiacos | (Spain) Barcelona | 3rd | 2017–18 |
| UEFA (Europe) | 2024–25 UEFA Futsal Champions League | (Spain) Palma Futsal | (Spain) Palma Futsal | 3rd | 2023–24 |
| UAFA (Arab States) | 2024–25 AGCFF Gulf Club Champions League | (United Arab Emirates) Al Shabab Al Arabi (2015) | (Iraq) Duhok | 1st | —N/a |
| FIFA (Global) | 2025 FIFA Club World Cup | (England) Manchester City | (England) Chelsea | 2nd | 2021 |
| FIFA (Global) | 2025 FIFA Intercontinental Cup | (Spain) Real Madrid | (France) Paris Saint-Germain | 1st | —N/a |
| FIFA (Global) | 2025 Challenger Cup | (Mexico) Pachuca | (Brazil) Flamengo | 1st | —N/a |
| FIFA (Global) | 2025 Derby of the Americas | (Mexico) Pachuca | (Brazil) Flamengo | 1st | —N/a |
| FIFA (Global) | 2025 African–Asian–Pacific Cup | (Egypt) Al Ahly | (Egypt) Pyramids | 1st | —N/a |
| FIFA (Global) | 2025 Under-20 Intercontinental Cup | (Brazil) Flamengo | (Brazil) Flamengo | 2nd | 2024 |
| FIFA (Global) | 2025 Intercontinental Futsal Cup | (Spain) Palma Futsal | (Spain) Palma Futsal | 3rd | 2024 |

=== Women ===
| Region | Tournament | Defending champion | Champion | Title | Last honour |
|---|---|---|---|---|---|
| AFC (Asia) | 2024–25 AFC Women's Champions League | First edition | (China) Wuhan Jiangda | 1st | —N/a |
| SAFF (South Asia) | 2025 SAFF Women's Club Championship | First edition | (India) East Bengal | 1st | —N/a |
| CAF (Africa) | 2025 CAF Women's Champions League | (Democratic Republic of the Congo) TP Mazembe | (Morocco) AS FAR | 2nd | 2022 |
| COSAFA | 2025 COSAFA Women's Champions League | (South Africa) UWC Ladies FC | (Botswana) Gaborone United | 1st | —N/a |
| CECAFA | 2025 CECAFA Women's Champions League | (Ethiopia) CBE | (Tanzania) JKT Queens | 2nd | 2023 |
| UNIFFAC | 2025 UNIFFAC Women's Champions League | (Democratic Republic of the Congo) TP Mazembe | (Equatorial Guinea) 15 de Agosto | 1st | —N/a |
| WAFU | 2025 WAFU Zone A Women's Champions League | (Senegal) Aigles de la Médina | (Mali) USFAS Bamako | 1st | —N/a |
| WAFU | 2025 WAFU Zone B Women's Champions League | (Nigeria) Edo Queens | (Ivory Coast) ASEC Mimosas | 1st | —N/a |
| UNAF | 2025 UNAF Women's Champions League | (Morocco) AS FAR | (Morocco) AS FAR | 3rd | 2024 |
| CONCACAF (North and Central America, Caribbean) | 2024–25 CONCACAF W Champions Cup | First edition | (United States) Gotham FC | 1st | —N/a |
| CONMEBOL (South America) | 2025 Copa Libertadores Femenina | (Brazil) Corinthians | (Brazil) Corinthians | 6th | 2024 |
| CONMEBOL (South America) | 2025 Copa Libertadores de Futsal Femenina | (Brazil) Stein Cascavel | (Brazil) Taboão Magnus | 2nd | 2022 |
| OFC (Oceania) | 2025 OFC Women's Champions League | (New Zealand) Auckland United | (New Zealand) Auckland United | 2nd | 2024 |
| UEFA (Europe) | 2024–25 UEFA Women's Champions League | (Spain) Barcelona | (England) Arsenal | 2nd | 2006–07 |

== National leagues ==
=== AFC ===
| Nation | League | Champion | Second place | Title | Last honour |
|---|---|---|---|---|---|
| Afghanistan | 2024–25 Afghanistan Champions League | Abu Muslim | Attack Energy | 1st | —N/a |
| Australia | 2024–25 A-League Men | Melbourne City | Melbourne Victory | 2nd | 2020–21 |
| Bahrain | 2024–25 Bahraini Premier League | Al-Muharraq | Al-Khaldiya | 35th | 2017–18 |
| Bangladesh | 2024–25 Bangladesh Premier League | Mohammedan | Dhaka Abahani | 1st | —N/a |
| Bhutan | 2025 Bhutan Premier League | Paro FC | Thimphu City FC | 6th | 2024 |
| Brunei | 2024–25 Brunei Super League | Kasuka | DPMM II | 2nd | 2023 |
| Cambodia | 2024–25 Cambodian Premier League | Preah Khan Reach Svay Rieng | Phnom Penh Crown | 4th | 2023–24 |
| China | 2025 Chinese Super League | Shanghai Port | Shanghai Shenhua | 4th | 2024 |
| Guam | 2025 Guam Soccer League | NAPA Rovers | Wings FC | 7th | 2018-19 |
| Hong Kong | 2024–25 Hong Kong Premier League | Tai Po | Lee Man | 2nd | 2018–19 |
| India | 2024–25 Indian Super League | Mohun Bagan | Bengaluru | 7th | 2023–24 |
| Indonesia | 2024–25 Liga 1 | Persib | Dewa United | 4th | 2023–24 |
| Iran | 2024–25 Persian Gulf Pro League | Tractor | Sepahan | 1st | —N/a |
| Iraq | 2024–25 Iraq Stars League | Al-Shorta | Al-Zawraa | 8th | 2023–24 |
| Japan | 2025 J1 League | Kashima Antlers | Kashiwa Reysol | 9th | 2016 |
| Jordan | 2024–25 Jordanian Pro League | Al-Hussein | Al-Wehdat | 2nd | 2023–24 |
| Kuwait | 2024–25 Kuwaiti Premier League | Al-Kuwait | Al-Arabi | 20th | 2023–24 |
| Kyrgyzstan | 2025 Kyrgyz Premier League | FC Bars | FC Muras United | 1st | —N/a |
| Laos | 2024–25 Lao League 1 | Ezra | Young Elephants | 1st | —N/a |
| Lebanon | 2024–25 Lebanese Premier League | Al Ansar | Safa | 15th | 2020–21 |
| Macau | 2025 Liga de Elite | Chao Pak Kei | Shao Jiang | 5th | 2023 |
| Malaysia | 2024–25 Malaysia Super League | Johor Darul Ta'zim | Selangor | 11th | 2023 |
| Maldives | 2025 Dhivehi Premier League | Season cancelled | | | |
| Mongolia | 2024–25 Mongolian Premier League | SP Falcons | Khangarid FC | 2nd | 2023–24 |
| Myanmar | 2024–25 Myanmar National League | Shan United | Yangon United | 6th | 2023 |
| Northern Mariana Islands | 2025 Marianas Soccer League 1 Spring | Kanoa | MP United | 2nd | 2024 Spring |
| Nepal | 2025 Nepal Super League | Lalitpur City | Pokhara Thunders | 2nd | 2023–24 |
| North Korea | 2024-25 Premier Football League | April 25 SC | Sobaeksu | 23rd | 2022–23 |
| Oman | 2024–25 Oman Professional League | Al-Seeb | Al Nahda | 4th | 2023–24 |
| Palestine | 2024–25 West Bank Premier League | Season cancelled | | | |
| Pakistan | 2024–25 Pakistan Premier League | Season cancelled | | | |
| Philippines | 2024–25 Philippines Football League | Kaya-Iloilo | Manila Digger | 3rd | 2024 |
| Qatar | 2024–25 Qatar Stars League | Al-Sadd | Al-Duhail | 18th | 2023–24 |
| Saudi Arabia | 2024–25 Saudi Pro League | Al-Ittihad | Al-Hilal | 10th | 2022–23 |
| Singapore | 2024–25 Singapore Premier League | Lion City Sailors | BG Tampines Rovers | 4th | 2021 |
| Sri Lanka | 2025 Sri Lanka Super League | Season cancelled | | | |
| South Korea | 2025 K League 1 | Jeonbuk Hyundai Motors | Daejeon Hana Citizen | 10th | 2021 |
| Syria | 2024–25 Syrian Premier League | Al Ittihad Ahli | Al-Karamah | 7th | 2004–05 |
| Taiwan | 2025 Taiwan Football Premier League | Not disputed due to calendar restructure | | | |
| Tajikistan | 2025 Tajikistan Higher League | FC Istiklol | FC Khatlon | 14th | 2024 |
| Thailand | 2024-25 Thai League 1 | Buriram United | Bangkok United | 11th | 2023-24 |
| Timor-Leste | 2025 Liga Futebol Timor-Leste | Karketu Dili | Emmanuel FC | 4th | 2023 |
| Turkmenistan | 2025 Ýokary Liga | FK Arkadag | Merw FK | 3rd | 2024 |
| United Arab Emirates | 2024–25 UAE Pro League | Shabab Al Ahli | Sharjah | 9th | 2022–23 |
| Uzbekistan | 2025 Uzbekistan Super League | FC Neftchi Fergana | Pakhtakor FC | 6th | 2001 |
| Vietnam | 2024–25 V.League 1 | Thép Xanh Nam Định | Hanoi FC | 3rd | 2023-24 |
| Yemen | 2024-25 Yemeni League | Season cancelled | | | |

=== CAF ===
| Nation | League | Champion | Second place | Title | Last honour |
|---|---|---|---|---|---|
| Algeria | 2024–25 Algerian Ligue Professionnelle 1 | MC Alger | JS Kabylie | 9th | 2023–24 |
| Angola | 2024–25 Girabola | Atlético Petróleos de Luanda | Wiliete SC | 19th | 2023–24 |
| Benin | 2024–25 Benin Premier League | Dadjè FC | Coton FC | 1st | —N/a |
| Botswana | 2024–25 Botswana Premier League | Gaborone United | TAFIC | 8th | 2021–22 |
| Burkina Faso | 2024–25 Burkinabé Premier League | Rahimo FC | US des Forces Armées | 2nd | 2018–19 |
| Burundi | 2024–25 Burundi Ligue A | Aigle Noir Makamba | Musongati FC | 2nd | 2018–19 |
| Cameroon | 2024–25 Elite One | Colombe Sportive | Panthère du Ndé | 1st | —N/a |
| Cape Verde | 2025 Cape Verdean Football Championships | GD Palmeira | Boavista FC | 2nd | 2023 |
| Central African Republic | 2024-25 Central African Republic League | AS Tempête Mocaf | FC FDS | 13th | 2023-24 |
| Chad | 2025 Chad Premier League | Season cancelled | | | |
| Comoros | 2024–25 Comoros Premier League | US Zilimadjou | FC Djomakawé | 6th | 2023-24 |
| (Republic of the Congo) Congo | 2024–25 Congo Ligue 1 | Season cancelled | | | |
| (Democratic Republic of the Congo) DR Congo | 2024–25 Linafoot | Aigles du Congo | Saint-Éloi Lupopo | 1st | —N/a |
| Djibouti | 2024–25 Djibouti Premier League | Djibouti Télécom | Garde-Côtes FC | 8th | 2017-18 |
| Equatorial Guinea | 2024–25 Equatoguinean Primera División | Fundación Bata | Malabo United | 1st | —N/a |
| Eritrea | 2025 Eritrean Premier League | Denden FC | Red Sea FC | 10th | 2024 |
| Egypt | 2024–25 Egyptian Premier League | Al Ahly | Pyramids | 45th | 2023–24 |
| Eswatini | 2024–25 Premier League of Eswatini | Nsingizini Hotspurs | Royal Leopards | 1st | —N/a |
| Ethiopia | 2024–25 Ethiopian Premier League | Ethiopian Insurance | Ethiopian Coffee | 1st | —N/a |
| (The Gambia) Gambia | 2024–25 GFA League First Division | Real de Banjul FC | Fortune FC | 15th | 2024-25 |
| Gabon | 2024–25 Gabon Championnat National D1 | AS Mangasport | FC 105 Libreville | 10th | 2018 |
| Ghana | 2024–25 Ghana Premier League | Bibiani Gold Stars | Heart of Lions | 1st | —N/a |
| Guinea | 2024–25 Guinée Championnat National | Horoya AC | Hafia FC | 21st | 2021-22 |
| Guinea-Bissau | 2024–25 Campeonato Nacional da Guiné-Bissau | Sport Bissau e Benfica | UD Internacional | 15th | 2023–24 |
| Ivory Coast | 2024–25 Ligue 1 | Stade d'Abidjan | ASEC Mimosas | 6th | 1969 |
| Kenya | 2024–25 Kenyan Premier League | Kenya Police | Gor Mahia | 1st | —N/a |
| Lesotho | 2024–25 Lesotho Premier League | Lioli | Matlama | 7th | 2023–24 |
| Liberia | 2024–25 LFA First Division | FC Fassell | Heaven Eleven | 1st | —N/a |
| Libya | 2024–25 Libyan Premier League | Al Ahli | Al Hilal Benghazi | 14th | 2022-23 |
| Madagascar | 2024–25 Malagasy Pro League | Elgeco Plus | COSFA | 3rd | 1978 |
| Malawi | 2025 Super League of Malawi | Mighty Wanderers | Nyasa Big Bullets | 7th | 2017 |
| Mali | 2024–25 Malian Première Division | Stade Malien | Djoliba AC | 24th | 2020–21 |
| Mauritania | 2024–25 Ligue 1 Mauritania | FC Nouadhibou | Chemal FC | 14th | 2023–24 |
| Mauritius | 2024–25 Mauritian Premier League | Cercle de Joachim SC | La Cure Waves | 4th | 2023–24 |
| Morocco | 2024–25 Botola | RS Berkane | FAR Rabat | 1st | —N/a |
| Mozambique | 2025 Moçambola | UD Songo | TBC | 4th | 2022 |
| Namibia | 2024–25 Namibia Premiership | African Stars | Young African FC | 3rd | 2023–24 |
| Niger | 2024–25 Super Ligue | AS FAN | Douanes | 6th | 2017 |
| Nigeria | 2024–25 Nigeria Premier Football League | Remo Stars | Rivers United | 1st | —N/a |
| Réunion | 2025 Régionale 1 Réunion | Season not disputed | | | |
| Rwanda | 2024–25 Rwanda Premier League | APR | Rayon Sports | 23rd | 2023–24 |
| São Tomé and Príncipe | 2025 São Tomé and Príncipe Championship | Sport Operário e Benfica | Vitória FC | 6th | 2021–22 |
| Senegal | 2024-25 Senegal Ligue 1 | ASC Jaraaf | US Gorée | 13th | 2017–18 |
| Seychelles | 2024-25 Seychelles Premier League | Côte d'Or FC | Anse Réunion FC | 4th | 2018 |
| Sierra Leone | 2024-25 Sierra Leone National Premier League | East End Lions | Bo Rangers | 13th | 2019 |
| Somalia | 2024-25 Somali First Division | Mogadishu City | Heegan FC | 2nd | 2019-20 |
| South Africa | 2024–25 South African Premiership | Mamelodi Sundowns | Orlando Pirates | 15th | 2023–24 |
| South Sudan | 2025 South Sudan Football Championship | Jamus SC | Kator FC | 1st | —N/a |
| Sudan | 2024-25 Sudan Premier League | Al Hilal Club | Al Merrikh SC | 31st | 2023-24 |
| Tanzania | 2024–25 Tanzanian Premier League | Young Africans | Simba | 31st | 2023-24 |
| Togo | 2024–25 Togolese Championnat National | ASC Kara | Gbohloé-su des Lacs | 2nd | 2018–19 |
| Tunisia | 2024–25 Tunisian Ligue Professionnelle 1 | ES Tunis | US Monastir | 34th | 2023–24 |
| Uganda | 2024–25 Uganda Premier League | Vipers | NEC | 7th | 2022–23 |
| Zambia | 2024–25 Zambia Super League | Power Dynamos | ZESCO United | 8th | 2022–23 |
| Zanzibar | 2024–25 Zanzibar Premier League | Mlandege FC | KVZ | 8th | 2019-20 |
| Zimbabwe | 2025 Zimbabwe Premier Soccer League | Scottland | MWOS | 1st | —N/a |

=== CONCACAF ===
| Nation | League | Champion | Second place | Title | Last honour |
|---|---|---|---|---|---|
| Anguilla | 2025 AFA Senior Male League | Roaring Lions FC | Attackers FC | 11th | 2022 |
| Antigua and Barbuda | 2024–25 Antigua and Barbuda Premier Division | All Saints United | Grenades FC | 2nd | 2023-24 |
| Aruba | 2024–25 Aruban Division di Honor | SV Britannia | SV Dakota | 6th | 2023-24 |
| (The Bahamas) Bahamas | 2024–25 BFA Senior League | Western Warriors SC | Renegades FC | 5th | 2023-24 |
| Barbados | 2025 Barbados Premier League | Weymouth Wales FC | Brittons Hill FC | 21st | 2023-24 |
| Belize | 2025 Closing Season | Verdes | San Pedro Pirates | 9th | 2023 Closing |
| Belize | 2025 Opening Season | Verdes | Progresso FC | 10th | 2025 Closing |
| Bonaire | 2024-25 Bonaire League | Real Rincon | Atlétiko Flamingo | 17th | 2023-24 |
| British Virgin Islands | 2024-25 BVIFA National Football League | Virgin Gorda United | Wolues FC | 1st | —N/a |
| Canada | 2025 Canadian Premier League | Atlético Ottawa | Cavalry FC | 1st | —N/a |
| Cayman Islands | 2024-25 Cayman Islands Premier League | Elite SC | 345 FC | 3rd | 2010–11 |
| Costa Rica | 2025 Liga FPD Clausura | Herediano | Alajuelense | 31st | 2024 Apertura |
| Costa Rica | 2025 Liga FPD Apertura | Alajuelense | Saprissa | 31st | 2020 Apertura |
| Cuba | 2025 Campeonato Nacional de Fútbol de Cuba | La Habana | Santiago de Cuba | 5th | 1967 |
| Curaçao | 2025 Curaçao Promé Divishon | Not disputed | | | |
| Dominica | 2025 Dominica Premier League | Dublanc FC | Mahaut Soca Strikers FC | 6th | 2024 |
| Dominican Republic | 2025 Liga Dominicana de Fútbol | Not disputed due to calendar restructure | | | |
| El Salvador | 2025 Torneo Clausura | Alianza FC | Municipal Limeño | 19th | 2023-24 |
| El Salvador | 2025 Torneo Apertura | Luis Ángel Firpo | Alianza FC | 11th | Clausura 2013 |
| French Guiana | 2024-25 French Guiana Régional 1 | US Sinnamary | Etoile Matoury | 4th | 1996–97 |
| Grenada | 2024-25 GFA Premier League | Paradise FC International | St. John's Sports | 7th | 2023-24 |
| Guadeloupe | 2024-25 Guadeloupe Division of Honor | CS Moulien | AS Gosier | 20th | 2023-24 |
| Guatemala | 2025 Liga Nacional Clausura | Antigua | Municipal | 5th | 2018–19 |
| Guatemala | 2025 Liga Nacional Apertura | Antigua | Municipal | 6th | 2025 Clausura |
| Guyana | 2025 GFF Elite League | Slingerz FC | Guyana Police Force | 2nd | 2015-16 |
| Haiti | 2025 D1 Special Championship | FC Juventus des Cayes | AS Capoise | 1st | —N/a |
| Honduras | 2025 Liga Nacional Clausura | C.D. Olimpia | Real España | 39th | 2024 Clausura |
| Honduras | 2025 Liga Nacional Apertura | C.D. Olimpia | Marathón | 40th | 2025 Clausura |
| Jamaica | 2024–25 Jamaica Premier League | Cavalier | Mount Pleasant | 3rd | 2023–24 |
| Martinique | 2024–25 Martinique Championnat National | RC Saint-Joseph | Club Franciscain | 1st | —N/a |
| Mexico | 2025 Liga MX Clausura | Toluca | América | 11th | 2010 Bicentenario |
| Mexico | 2025 Liga MX Apertura | Toluca | Tigres UANL | 12th | 2025 Clausura |
| Montserrat | 2024–25 Montserrat Championship | Not disputed | | | |
| Nicaragua | 2025 Liga Primera Clausura | Managua FC | Real Estelí | 2nd | 2018 Apertura |
| Nicaragua | 2025 Liga Primera Apertura | Diriangén FC | Managua FC | 34th | 2024 Apertura |
| Panama | 2025 Liga Panameña Apertura | Plaza Amador | San Francisco | 8th | 2021 Apertura |
| Panama | 2025 Liga Panameña Clausura | Plaza Amador | Alianza FC | 9th | 2025 Apertura |
| Puerto Rico | 2025 Liga Puerto Rico | Metropolitan FA | Academia Quintana | 5th | 2023 Clausura |
| Puerto Rico | 2025 Liga Puerto Rico Apertura | Academia Quintana | Puerto Rico Surf | 4th | 2024 |
| Saint Kitts and Nevis | 2025 SKNFA Premier League | St. Paul's United | Village Superstars | 8th | 2024 |
| Saint Lucia | 2025 Saint Lucia Premier League | La Clery | Vieux Fort-South | 2nd | 2024 |
| (Collectivity of Saint Martin) Saint Martin | 2024-25 Saint-Martin Senior League | Junior Stars | St. Louis Stars | 18th | 2023-24 |
| Saint Vincent and the Grenadines | 2024-25 SVGFF Premier Division | North Leeward Predators FC | Hope International FC | 1st | —N/a |
| Sint Maarten | 2024-25 Sint Maarten Premier League | SCSA Eagles | United Superstars | 4th | 2023-24 |
| Suriname | 2025 Suriname Major League | Inter Moengotapoe | PVV | 11th | 2018–19 |
| Trinidad and Tobago | 2024-25 TT Premier Football League | Defense Force | Central FC | 25th | 2023 |
| (Turks and Caicos Islands) Turks and Caicos | 2024–25 Provo Premier League | SWA Sharks FC | AFC Academy | 5th | 2022-23 |
| United States | 2025 Major League Soccer season | Inter Miami | (Canada) Vancouver Whitecaps | 1st | —N/a |
| (United States Virgin Islands) US Virgin Islands | 2025 USVISF Premier League season | Helenites SC | Raymix SC | 6th | 2018-19 |

=== CONMEBOL ===
| Nation | League | Champion | Second place | Title | Last honour |
|---|---|---|---|---|---|
| Argentina | 2025 Liga Profesional Apertura | Platense | Huracán | 1st | —N/a |
| Argentina | 2025 Liga Profesional Clausura | Estudiantes (LP) | Racing | 7th | 2010 Apertura |
| Bolivia | 2025 División Profesional | Always Ready | Bolívar | 4th | 2020 Apertura |
| Brazil | 2025 Campeonato Brasileiro Série A | Flamengo | Palmeiras | 8th | 2020 |
| Chile | 2025 Liga de Primera | Coquimbo Unido | Universidad Católica | 1st | —N/a |
| Colombia | 2025 Categoría Primera A Apertura | Santa Fe | Independiente Medellín | 10th | 2016 Finalización |
| Colombia | 2025 Categoría Primera A Finalización | Junior | Deportes Tolima | 11th | 2023 Finalización |
| Ecuador | 2025 LigaPro Serie A | Independiente del Valle | LDU Quito | 2nd | 2021 |
| Paraguay | 2025 Copa de Primera Apertura | Libertad | Cerro Porteño | 26th | 2024 Apertura |
| Paraguay | 2025 Copa de Primera Clausura | Cerro Porteño | Guaraní | 35th | 2021 Clausura |
| Peru | 2025 Liga 1 | Universitario | Cusco | 29th | 2024 |
| Uruguay | 2025 Liga AUF Uruguaya | Nacional | Peñarol | 50th | 2022 |
| Venezuela | 2025 Liga FUTVE | Universidad Central | Carabobo | 4th | 1957 |

=== OFC ===
| Nation | League | Champion | Second place | Title | Last honour |
|---|---|---|---|---|---|
| American Samoa | 2025 FFAS Senior League | Royal Puma FC | TBC | 2nd | 2023 |
| Cook Islands | 2025 Cook Islands Round Cup | Tupapa Maraerenga | Nikao Sokattak | 20th | 2024 |
| Fiji | 2025 Fiji Premier League | Rewa | Labasa | 3rd | 2024 |
| Kiribati | 2025 Kiribati National Championship | Tarawa Urban Council | Betio Town Council | 4th | 2004 |
| New Caledonia | 2025 New Caledonia Super Ligue | AS Tiga Sport | ASC Gaïca | 3rd | 2022 |
| New Zealand | 2025 New Zealand National League | Auckland City | Wellington Olympic | 11th | 2024 |
| Papua New Guinea | 2025 PNG Premier Soccer League | Gulf Komara | Morobe Wawens | 1st | —N/a |
| Samoa | 2025 Samoa National League | Vaipuna SC | Lupe ole Soaga | 3rd | 2024 |
| Solomon Islands | 2025 S-League | Central Coast | Malaita Kingz | 3rd | 2024 |
| (French Polynesia) Tahiti | 2025 Tahiti Ligue 1 | AS Vénus | AS Pirae | 11th | 2018-19 |
| Tonga | 2025 Tonga Major League | Nukuhetulu FC | TBC | 1st | —N/a |
| Tuvalu | 2025 Tuvalu A-Division | To be confirmed | | | |
| Vanuatu | 2025 VFF Champions League | Galaxy FC | M3 United | 3rd | 2021 |

=== UEFA ===
| Nation | League | Champion | Second place | Title | Last honour |
|---|---|---|---|---|---|
| Albania | 2024–25 Kategoria Superiore | Egnatia | Vllaznia | 2nd | 2023–24 |
| Andorra | 2024–25 Primera Divisió | Inter Club d'Escaldes | Atlètic Club d'Escaldes | 4th | 2021–22 |
| Armenia | 2024–25 Armenian Premier League | Noah | Ararat-Armenia | 1st | —N/a |
| Austria | 2024–25 Austrian Football Bundesliga | Sturm Graz | Red Bull Salzburg | 5th | 2023–24 |
| Azerbaijan | 2024–25 Azerbaijan Premier League | Qarabağ | Zira | 12th | 2023–24 |
| Belarus | 2025 Belarusian Premier League | Maxline Vitebsk | Dinamo Minsk | 1st | —N/a |
| Belgium | 2024–25 Belgian Pro League | Union Saint-Gilloise | Club Brugge | 12th | 1934–35 |
| Bosnia and Herzegovina | 2024–25 Premier League of Bosnia and Herzegovina | Zrinjski Mostar | Borac Banja Luka | 9th | 2022–23 |
| Bulgaria | 2024–25 First Professional Football League | Ludogorets Razgrad | Levski Sofia | 14th | 2023–24 |
| Croatia | 2024–25 Croatian Football League | Rijeka | Dinamo Zagreb | 2nd | 2016–17 |
| Cyprus | 2024–25 Cypriot First Division | Pafos | Aris Limassol | 1st | —N/a |
| Czech Republic | 2024–25 Czech First League | Slavia Prague | Viktoria Plzeň | 21st | 2020–21 |
| Denmark | 2024–25 Danish Superliga | Copenhagen | Midtjylland | 16th | 2022–23 |
| England | 2024–25 Premier League | Liverpool | Arsenal | 20th | 2019–20 |
| Estonia | 2025 Meistriliiga | Flora | Levadia | 16th | 2023 |
| Faroe Islands | 2025 Faroe Islands Premier League | KÍ | HB | 22nd | 2023 |
| Finland | 2025 Veikkausliiga | KuPS | Inter Turku | 8th | 2024 |
| France | 2024–25 Ligue 1 | Paris Saint-Germain | Marseille | 13th | 2023–24 |
| (Georgia (country)) Georgia | 2025 Erovnuli Liga | Iberia 1999 | Dila Gori | 3rd | 2024 |
| Germany | 2024–25 Bundesliga | Bayern Munich | Bayer Leverkusen | 34th | 2022–23 |
| Gibraltar | 2024–25 Gibraltar Football League | Lincoln Red Imps | St Joseph's | 29th | 2023–24 |
| Greece | 2024–25 Super League Greece | Olympiacos | Panathinaikos | 48th | 2021–22 |
| Hungary | 2024–25 Nemzeti Bajnokság I | Ferencváros | Puskás Akadémia | 36th | 2023–24 |
| Iceland | 2025 Besta deild karla | Víkingur Reykjavík | Valur | 8th | 2023 |
| Israel | 2024–25 Israeli Premier League | Maccabi Tel Aviv | Hapoel Be'er Sheva | 26th | 2023–24 |
| Italy | 2024–25 Serie A | Napoli | Inter Milan | 4th | 2022–23 |
| Kazakhstan | 2025 Kazakhstan Premier League | Kairat | Astana | 5th | 2024 |
| Kosovo | 2024–25 Football Superleague of Kosovo | Drita | Ballkani | 4th | 2019–20 |
| Latvia | 2025 Latvian Higher League | Riga | RFS | 4th | 2020 |
| Lithuania | 2025 A Lyga | Kauno Žalgiris | Hegelmann | 1st | —N/a |
| Luxembourg | 2024–25 Luxembourg National Division | Differdange 03 | UNA Strassen | 2nd | 2023–24 |
| Malta | 2024–25 Maltese Premier League | Ħamrun Spartans | Birkirkara | 11th | 2023–24 |
| Moldova | 2024–25 Moldovan Super Liga | Milsami Orhei | Sheriff Tiraspol | 2nd | 2014–15 |
| Montenegro | 2024–25 Montenegrin First League | Budućnost Podgorica | Petrovac | 7th | 2022–23 |
| Netherlands | 2024–25 Eredivisie | PSV Eindhoven | Ajax | 26th | 2023–24 |
| North Macedonia | 2024–25 Macedonian First Football League | Shkëndija | Sileks | 5th | 2020–21 |
| Northern Ireland | 2024–25 NIFL Premiership | Linfield | Larne | 57th | 2021–22 |
| Norway | 2025 Eliteserien | Viking | Bodø/Glimt | 9th | 1991 |
| Poland | 2024–25 Ekstraklasa | Lech Poznań | Raków Częstochowa | 9th | 2021–22 |
| Portugal | 2024–25 Primeira Liga | Sporting CP | Benfica | 21st | 2023–24 |
| Republic of Ireland | 2025 League of Ireland Premier Division | Shamrock Rovers | Derry City | 22nd | 2023 |
| Romania | 2024–25 Liga I | FCSB | CFR Cluj | 28th | 2023–24 |
| Russia | 2024–25 Russian Premier League | Krasnodar | Zenit Saint Petersburg | 1st | —N/a |
| San Marino | 2024–25 Campionato Sammarinese di Calcio | Virtus | La Fiorita | 2nd | 2023–24 |
| Scotland | 2024–25 Scottish Premiership | Celtic | Rangers | 55th | 2023–24 |
| Serbia | 2024–25 Serbian SuperLiga | Red Star Belgrade | Partizan | 36th | 2023–24 |
| Slovakia | 2024–25 Slovak First Football League | Slovan Bratislava | Žilina | 15th | 2023–24 |
| Slovenia | 2024–25 Slovenian PrvaLiga | Olimpija Ljubljana | Maribor | 4th | 2022–23 |
| Spain | 2024–25 La Liga | Barcelona | Real Madrid | 28th | 2022–23 |
| Sweden | 2025 Allsvenskan | Mjällby AIF | Hammarby | 1st | —N/a |
| Switzerland | 2024–25 Swiss Super League | Basel | Servette | 21st | 2016–17 |
| Turkey | 2024–25 Süper Lig | Galatasaray | Fenerbahçe | 25th | 2023–24 |
| Ukraine | 2024–25 Ukrainian Premier League | Dynamo Kyiv | Oleksandriya | 17th | 2020–21 |
| Wales | 2024–25 Cymru Premier | The New Saints | Penybont | 17th | 2023–24 |

== Domestic cups ==
=== AFC ===
| Nation | Cup | Champion | Final score | Second place | Title | Last honour | |
|---|---|---|---|---|---|---|---|
| Australia | 2025 Australia Cup | Newcastle Jets | 3–1 (a.e.t.) | Heidelberg United | 1st | —N/a | |
| Bahrain | 2024–25 King's Cup | Al-Khaldiya | 3–2 | Sitra Club | 2nd | 2021–22 | |
| Bahrain | 2024–25 Khalid Bin Hamad Cup | Al-Khaldiya | 1–0 (a.e.t.) | Al-Riffa | 1st | —N/a | |
| Bahrain | 2024-25 Bahraini Super Cup | Al-Khaldiya | 5-2 | Al Ahli (Manama) | 3rd | 2023-24 | |
| Bangladesh | 2024–25 Federation Cup | Bashundhara Kings | 1–1 (a.e.t.) (5–3 p) | Dhaka Abahani | 4th | 2023-24 | |
| Brunei | 2025 Brunei FA Cup | DPMM FC II | 1–0 | Indera SC | 3rd | 2022 | |
| Cambodia | 2025 Hun Sen Cup | Phnom Penh Crown | 2-1 | Preah Khan Reach Svay Rieng FC | 3rd | 2009 | |
| Cambodia | 2025 Cambodian Super Cup | Preah Khan Reach Svay Rieng FC | 2–2 (a.e.t.) (5–3 p) | Phnom Penh Crown | 2nd | 2024 | |
| China | 2025 Chinese FA Cup | Beijing Guoan | 3-0 | Henan FC | 6th | 2018 | |
| China | 2025 Chinese FA Super Cup | Shanghai Shenhua F.C. | 3–2 | Shanghai Port | 5th | 2024 | |
| Hong Kong | 2024–25 Hong Kong FA Cup | Eastern | 3–1 | HK Rangers | 7th | 2023–24 | |
| Hong Kong | 2024–25 Hong Kong Senior Challenge Shield | Eastern | 1–0 | Lee Man | 12th | 2019–20 | |
| India | 2025 Kalinga Super Cup | FC Goa | 3–0 | Jamshedpur | 2nd | 2019 | |
| India | 2025 Durand Cup | NorthEast United | 6-1 | Diamond Harbour FC | 2nd | 2024 | |
| Iran | 2024–25 Hazfi Cup | Esteghlal | 1-0 (a.e.t.) | Malavan | 8th | 2017-18 | |
| Iran | 2025 Iranian Super Cup | Tractor | 2-1 | Esteghlal | 1st | —N/a | |
| Iraq | 2024–25 Iraq FA Cup | Duhok | 0–0 (a.e.t.) (5–3 p) | Zakho | 1st | —N/a | |
| Iraq | 2025 Iraqi Super Cup | Cancelled | | | | | |
| Japan | 2025 Emperor's Cup | Machida Zelvia | 3-1 | Vissel Kobe | 1st | —N/a | |
| Japan | 2025 J.League Cup | Sanfrecce Hiroshima | 3-1 | Kashiwa Reysol | 2nd | 2022 | |
| Japan | 2025 Japanese Super Cup | Sanfrecce Hiroshima | 2–0 | Vissel Kobe | 5th | 2016 | |
| Jordan | 2024–25 Jordan FA Cup | Al-Wehdat | 0–0 (3–1 p) | Al-Hussein | 13th | 2023–24 | |
| Jordan | 2025 Jordan Shield Cup | Al-Faisaly | League format | Al-Wehdat SC | 10th | 2023 | |
| Jordan | 2025 Jordan Super Cup | Al-Hussein SC | 2–1 (agg.) | Al-Wehdat SC | 3rd | 2024 | |
| Kuwait | 2024–25 Kuwait Crown Prince Cup | Kuwait SC | 1–0 (a.e.t.) | Al-Arabi SC | 10th | 2020–21 | |
| Kuwait | 2024–25 Kuwait Emir Cup | Kuwait SC | 2-0 | Al-Arabi SC | 17th | 2022-23 | |
| Kuwait | 2024–25 Kuwait Super Cup | Al-Kuwait | 1–1 (7–6 p) | Al-Qadsia | 8th | 2023–24 | |
| Kyrgyzstan | 2025 Kyrgyzstan Cup | Dordoi Bishkek | 2-1 (a.e.t.) | Muras United | 11th | 2018 | |
| Kyrgyzstan | 2025 Kyrgyzstan Super Cup | Abdysh-Ata | 0–0 (4–3 p) | Muras United | 2nd | 2016 | |
| Laos | 2025 Prime Minister's Cup | Ezra FC | 2–1 | Young Elephants FC | 1st | —N/a | |
| Lebanon | 2024–25 Lebanese FA Cup | Cancelled | | | | | |
| Lebanon | 2025 Lebanese Super Cup | Cancelled | | | | | |
| Lebanon | Macau | 2025 Taça de Macau | Benfica de Macau | 6-2 | Cheng Fung | 4th | 2017 |
| Malaysia | 2025 Malaysia FA Cup | Johor Darul Ta'zim | 5-0 | Sabah FC | 5th | 2024 | |
| Malaysia | 2024–25 Malaysia Cup | Johor Darul Ta'zim | 2–1 | Sri Pahang | 5th | 2023 | |
| Malaysia | 2024–25 MFL Challenge Cup | Selangor | 7–0 (agg.) | PDRM | 1st | —N/a | |
| Malaysia | 2025 Piala Sumbangsih | Johor Darul Ta'zim | 3-0 | Selangor | 10th | 2024 | |
| Maldives | 2025 Maldivian FA Charity Shield | Maziya | 2-0 | Club Eagles | 6th | 2023 | |
| Myanmar | 2025 MNL League Cup | Yangon United | 1-0 | Shan United | 4th | 2019 | |
| Oman | 2024–25 Oman Professional League Cup | Al-Seeb Club | 2–1 | Bahla Club | 4th | 2023–24 | |
| Oman | 2024–25 Sultan Qaboos Cup | Al-Shabab | 1–0 | Al-Seeb Club | 1st | —N/a | |
| Qatar | 2025 Qatar Cup | Al Sadd | 2–2 (a.e.t.) (4–3 p) | Al-Duhail | 9th | 2021 | |
| Qatar | 2025 Emir of Qatar Cup | Al-Gharafa | 2–1 | Al-Rayyan | 8th | 2012 | |
| Saudi Arabia | 2024–25 King's Cup | Al-Ittihad | 3–1 | Al-Qadsiah | 10th | 2018 | |
| Saudi Arabia | 2025 Saudi Super Cup | Al-Ahli Saudi | 2-2 (5–3 p) | Al-Nassr | 2nd | 2016 | |
| Singapore | 2024–25 Singapore Cup | Lion City Sailors | 1–0 | Tampines Rovers | 8th | 2023 | |
| South Korea | 2025 Korea Cup | Jeonbuk Hyundai Motors | 2-1 (a.e.t.) | Gwangju FC | 6th | 2022 | |
| Taiwan | 2025 Taiwan President FA Cup | Tainan City | 1-0 | Taiwan Power | 1st | —N/a | |
| Tajikistan | 2025 Tajikistan Cup | FC Istiklol | 2–0 | CSKA Pamir Dushanbe | 11th | 2023 | |
| Tajikistan | 2025 Tajik Super Cup | FC Istiklol | 1–1 (a.e.t.) (5–4 p) | Regar-TadAZ Tursunzoda | 13th | 2024 | |
| Thailand | 2024–25 Thai FA Cup | Buriram United | 3–2 | Muangthong United | 7th | 2022–23 | |
| Thailand | 2024–25 Thai League Cup | Buriram United | 2–0 | Lamphun Warriors | 8th | 2022–23 | |
| Turkmenistan | 2025 Turkmenistan Cup | Arkadag | 2-1 | Ahal | 3rd | 2024 | |
| United Arab Emirates | 2024–25 UAE President's Cup | Shabab Al Ahli | 2–1 | Sharjah | 11th | 2020–21 | |
| United Arab Emirates | 2024–25 UAE League Cup | Al Jazira | 2–1 | Shabab Al Ahli | 2nd | 2009-10 | |
| United Arab Emirates | 2025 UAE Super Cup | Sharjah | 3-2 | Shabab Al Ahli | 4th | 2022 | |
| Uzbekistan | 2025 Uzbekistan Cup | Pakhtakor | 1–0 | Bukhara | 14th | 2024 | |
| Uzbekistan | 2025 Uzbekistan Super Cup | Nasaf | 1–0 | FC Andijon | 4th | 2024 | |
| Vietnam | 2024–25 Vietnamese Cup | Công An Hà Nội | 5–0 | Sông Lam Nghệ An | 1st | —N/a | |
| Vietnam | 2025 Vietnamese Super Cup | Công An Hà Nội | 3–2 | Thép Xanh Nam Định | 1st | —N/a | |

=== CAF ===
| Nation | Cup | Champion | Final score | Second place | Title | Last honour |
|---|---|---|---|---|---|---|
| Algeria | 2024–25 Algerian Cup | USM Alger | 2–0 | CR Belouizdad | 9th | 2012–13 |
| Algeria | 2024 Algerian Super Cup | MC Alger | 2–2 (4–3 p) | CR Belouizdad | 4th | 2014 |
| Botswana | 2025 Botswana FA Cup | Jwaneng Galaxy | 2–0 | Security Systems | 2nd | 2024 |
| Burkina Faso | 2024–25 Burkina Faso Cup | Rahimo FC | 1–1 (3–1 p) | Sporting Cascades | 2nd | 2019 |
| Burundi | 2025 Burundian Cup | Flambeau du Centre | 1–0 | Musongati FC | 1st | —N/a |
| Egypt | 2024–25 Egypt Cup | Zamalek | 1–1 (8–7 p) | Pyramids | 29th | 2020–21 |
| Ivory Coast | 2025 Coupe de Côte d'Ivoire | FC San Pédro | 1–1 (a.e.t.) (4–2 p) | RC Abidjan | 2nd | 2019 |
| Ethiopia | 2025 Ethiopian Cup | Sidama Coffee | 2–1 | Wolaitta Dicha | 1st | —N/a |
| Mali | 2025 Malian Cup | Stade Malien | 1–0 | Djoliba AC | 24th | 2023 |
| Morocco | 2024–25 Moroccan Throne Cup | Olympic Club Safi | 1–1 (a.e.t.) (6–5 p) | RS Berkane | 1st | —N/a |
| Rwanda | 2025 Heroes Cup | APR | 0–0 (a.e.t.) (4–2 p) | Police | — | — |
| South Africa | 2024–25 Nedbank Cup | Kaizer Chiefs | 2–1 | Orlando Pirates | 14th | 2012–13 |
| Tunisia | 2023–24 Tunisian Super Cup | Espérance Sportive de Tunis | 2–0 | Stade Tunisien | 7th | 2020–21 |
| Uganda | 2024–25 Uganda Cup | Vipers SC | 2–0 | KCCA FC | 4th | 2023 |
| Zambia | 2025 ABSA Cup | ZESCO United | 1–1 (4–2 p) | Red Arrows | 7th | 2019 |
| Zimbabwe | 2025 Zimbabwe Challenge Cup | Dynamos | 1–1 (a.e.t.) (5–3 p) | Simba Bhora | 1st | —N/a |

=== CONCACAF ===
| Nation | Cup | Champion | Final score | Second place | Title | Last honour |
|---|---|---|---|---|---|---|
| Canada | 2025 Canadian Championship | Vancouver Whitecaps | 4–2 | Vancouver FC | 5th | 2024 |
| Costa Rica | 2024–25 Costa Rican Cup | LD Alajuelense | 1–0 | Puntarenas | 2nd | 2023 |
| Dominican Republic | 2025 Copa Dominicana de Futbol | Cibao FC | 2-1 (Agg.) | Delfines del Este FC | 3rd | 2016 |
| Mexico | 2025 Campeón de Campeones | Toluca | 3–1 | América | 5th | 2006 |
| Nicaragua | 2025 Copa Primera | Diriangén FC | 2–1 | Real Estelí FC | 3rd | 2024 |
| Saint Kitts and Nevis | 2025 Saint Kitts and Nevis National Cup | Village Superstars | 1–0 | St. Paul's United | 5th | 2017 |
| United States | 2025 U.S. Open Cup | Nashville SC | 2–1 | Austin FC | 1st | —N/a |

=== CONMEBOL ===
| Nation | Cup | Champion | Final score | Second place | Title | Last honour |
|---|---|---|---|---|---|---|
| Argentina | 2025 Copa Argentina | Independiente Rivadavia | 2–2 (5–3 p) | Argentinos Juniors | 1st | —N/a |
| Argentina | 2023 Supercopa Internacional | Talleres (C) | 0–0 (3–2 p) | River Plate | 1st | —N/a |
| Argentina | 2024 Supercopa Argentina | Vélez Sarsfield | 2–0 | Central Córdoba (SdE) | 2nd | 2013 |
| Argentina | 2024 Supercopa Internacional | Vélez Sarsfield | 2–0 | Estudiantes (LP) | 1st | —N/a |
| Argentina | 2025 Trofeo de Campeones de la Liga Profesional | Estudiantes (LP) | 2–1 | Platense | 2nd | 2024 |
| Bolivia | 2025 Copa Bolivia | Nacional Potosí | 4–3 (agg.) | Bolívar | 1st | —N/a |
| Bolivia | 2025 Torneo Amistoso de Verano | Bolívar | 6–2 (agg.) | Blooming | 1st | —N/a |
| (Brazil) Brasil | 2025 Copa do Brasil | Corinthians | 2–1 (agg.) | Vasco da Gama | 4th | 2009 |
| (Brazil) Brasil | 2025 Supercopa do Brasil | Flamengo | 3–1 | Botafogo | 3rd | 2021 |
| Chile | 2025 Copa Chile | Huachipato | 1–1 (4–3 p) | Deportes Limache | 1st | —N/a |
| Chile | 2025 Supercopa de Chile | Universidad de Chile | 3–0 | Colo-Colo | 2nd | 2015 |
| Colombia | 2025 Copa Colombia | Atlético Nacional | 1–0 (agg.) | Independiente Medellín | 8th | 2024 |
| Colombia | 2025 Superliga Colombiana | Atlético Nacional | 1–1 (4–3 p) | Atlético Bucaramanga | 4th | 2023 |
| Ecuador | 2025 Copa Ecuador | Universidad Católica | 3–2 | LDU Quito | 1st | —N/a |
| Ecuador | 2025 Supercopa Ecuador | LDU Quito | 0–0 (5–4 p) | El Nacional | 3rd | 2021 |
| Paraguay | 2025 Copa Paraguay | General Caballero (JLM) | 1–0 | 2 de Mayo | 1st | —N/a |
| Paraguay | 2024 Supercopa Paraguay | Libertad | 2–1 | Olimpia | 2nd | 2023 |
| Paraguay | 2025 Supercopa Paraguay | Cerro Porteño | 5–2 | General Caballero (JLM) | 1st | —N/a |
| Uruguay | 2025 Copa Uruguay | Peñarol | 2–0 | Plaza Colonia | 1st | —N/a |
| Uruguay | 2025 Supercopa Uruguaya | Nacional | 2–1 | Peñarol | 3rd | 2021 |
| Venezuela | 2025 Copa Venezuela | Universidad Central | 0–0 (4–3 p) | Carabobo | 1st | —N/a |
| Venezuela | 2025 Supercopa de Venezuela | Deportivo La Guaira | 1–1 (a.e.t.) (4–1 p) | Deportivo Táchira | 1st | —N/a |

=== OFC ===
| Nation | Cup | Champion | Final score | Second place | Title | Last honour |
|---|---|---|---|---|---|---|
| Fiji | 2025 Champion versus Champion | Rewa | 4–0 | Labasa | 2nd | 2010 |
| Fiji | 2025 Fiji FA Cup | Labasa | 1–1 (a.e.t.) (3–1 p) | Rewa | 5th | 2024 |
| New Zealand | 2025 Chatham Cup | Wellington Olympic | 4–2 | Auckland United | 3rd | 2024 |

=== UEFA ===
| Nation | Cup | Champion | Final score | Second place | Title | Last honour |
|---|---|---|---|---|---|---|
| Albania | 2024–25 Albanian Cup | Dinamo City | 2–2 (5–4 p) | Egnatia | 14th | 2002–03 |
| Albania | 2025 Albanian Supercup | Dinamo City | 3–1 | Egnatia | 3rd | 2008 |
| Andorra | 2025 Copa Constitució | Inter Club d'Escaldes | 1–0 | Atlètic Club d'Escaldes | 3rd | 2023 |
| Andorra | 2025 Andorran Supercup | Atlètic d'Escaldes | 2–2 (5–3 p) | Inter Club d'Escaldes | 1st | —N/a |
| Armenia | 2024–25 Armenian Cup | Noah | 3–1 | Ararat-Armenia | 2nd | 2019–20 |
| Armenia | 2025 Armenian Supercup | | | | | |
| Austria | 2024–25 Austrian Cup | Wolfsberger AC | 1–0 | TSV Hartberg | 1st | —N/a |
| Azerbaijan | 2024–25 Azerbaijan Cup | Sabah | 3–2 (a.e.t.) | Qarabağ | 1st | —N/a |
| Azerbaijan | 2025 Azerbaijan Supercup | | | | | |
| Belarus | 2024–25 Belarusian Cup | Neman Grodno | 3–0 | Torpedo-BelAZ Zhodino | 3rd | 2023–24 |
| Belarus | 2025 Belarusian Super Cup | Dinamo Minsk | 2–0 | Neman Grodno | 1st | —N/a |
| Belgium | 2024–25 Belgian Cup | Club Brugge | 2–1 | Anderlecht | 12th | 2014–15 |
| Belgium | 2025 Belgian Super Cup | Club Brugge | 2–1 | Union Saint-Gilloise | 18th | 2022 |
| Bosnia and Herzegovina | 2024–25 Bosnia and Herzegovina Football Cup | FK Sarajevo | 5–1 | Široki Brijeg | 8th | 2020–21 |
| Bosnia and Herzegovina | 2024 Supercup of Bosnia and Herzegovina | Zrinjski Mostar | 1–0 | Borac Banja Luka | 1st | —N/a |
| Bulgaria | 2024–25 Bulgarian Cup | Ludogorets Razgrad | 1–0 | CSKA Sofia | 4th | 2022–23 |
| Bulgaria | 2024 Bulgarian Supercup | Ludogorets Razgrad | 3–2 | Botev Plovdiv | 8th | 2023 |
| Croatia | 2024–25 Croatian Football Cup | HNK Rijeka | 2–1 (a.e.t.) | Slaven Belupo | 7th | 2019–20 |
| Cyprus | 2024–25 Cypriot Cup | AEK Larnaca | 0–0 (5–4 p) | Pafos | 3rd | 2017–18 |
| Cyprus | 2025 Cypriot Super Cup | | | | | |
| Czech Republic | 2024–25 Czech Cup | Sigma Olomouc | 3–1 | Sparta Prague | 2nd | 2011–12 |
| Denmark | 2024–25 Danish Cup | Copenhagen | 3–0 | Silkeborg | 10th | 2022–23 |
| England | 2024–25 FA Cup | Crystal Palace | 1–0 | Manchester City | 1st | —N/a |
| England | 2025 FA Community Shield | Crystal Palace | 2–2 (3–2 p) | Liverpool | 1st | —N/a |
| England | 2024–25 EFL Cup | Newcastle United | 2–1 | Liverpool | 1st | —N/a |
| Estonia | 2025 Estonian Supercup | FCI Levadia | 3–2 | Nõmme Kalju | 9th | 2022 |
| Estonia | 2024–25 Estonian Cup | Nõmme Kalju | 3–3 (4–1 p) | FCI Levadia | 2nd | 2014–15 |
| Faroe Islands | 2025 Faroe Islands Cup | KÍ | 2–0 | Víkingur Gøta | 7th | 2016 |
| Faroe Islands | 2025 Faroe Islands Super Cup | HB Torshavn | 2–0 | Víkingur Gøta | 6th | 2024 |
| Faroe Islands | 2025 VFF Cup | B36 Tórshavn | 3–0 | TB Tvoroyri | 1st | —N/a |
| Finland | 2025 Finnish Cup | HJK | 1–0 | KuPS | 15th | 2020 |
| Finland | 2025 Finnish League Cup | | | | | |
| France | 2024–25 Coupe de France | Paris Saint-Germain | 3–0 | Reims | 16th | 2023–24 |
| France | 2025 Trophée des Champions | Paris Saint-Germain | 2–2 (4–1 p) | Marseille | 14th | 2024 |
| Germany | 2024–25 DFB-Pokal | VfB Stuttgart | 4–2 | Arminia Bielefeld | 4th | 1996–97 |
| Germany | 2025 Franz Beckenbauer Supercup | Bayern Munich | 2–1 | VfB Stuttgart | 11th | 2022 |
| (Georgia (country)) Georgia | 2025 Georgian Cup | Dila | 3–1 | Iberia 1999 | 2nd | 2011–12 |
| (Georgia (country)) Georgia | 2025 Georgian Super Cup | Dila Gori | 2–0 | Spaeri | 1st | —N/a |
| Gibraltar | 2024–25 Rock Cup | Bruno's Magpies | 3–1 | Lions Gibraltar | 2nd | 2022–23 |
| Greece | 2024–25 Greek Cup | Olympiacos | 2–0 | OFI | 29th | 2019–20 |
| Greece | 2025 Greek Super Cup | Olympiacos | 3–0 | OFI | 5th | 2007 |
| Hungary | 2024–25 Magyar Kupa | Paks | 1–1 (a.e.t.) (4–3 p) | Ferencváros | 2nd | 2023–24 |
| Iceland | 2025 Icelandic Men's Football Cup | Vestri | 1–0 | Valur | 1st | —N/a |
| Iceland | 2025 Icelandic Super Cup | Breiðablik | 3–1 | KA | 2nd | 2023 |
| Iceland | 2025 Icelandic Men's Football League Cup | Valur | 3–2 | Fylkir | 4th | 2023 |
| (Republic of Ireland) Ireland | 2025 FAI Cup | Shamrock Rovers | 2–0 | Cork City | 26th | 2019 |
| (Republic of Ireland) Ireland | 2025 President of Ireland's Cup | Shelbourne | 2–0 | Drogheda United | 1st | —N/a |
| Israel | 2024–25 Israel State Cup | Hapoel Be'er Sheva | 2–0 | Beitar Jerusalem | 4th | 2021–22 |
| Israel | 2024–25 Toto Cup Al | Maccabi Tel Aviv | 3–1 | Maccabi Haifa | 8th | 2020–21 |
| Israel | 2025 Israel Super Cup | Hapoel Be'er Sheva | 2–1 | Maccabi Tel Aviv | 5th | 2022 |
| Italy | 2024–25 Coppa Italia | Bologna | 1–0 | AC Milan | 3rd | 1973–74 |
| Italy | 2025 Supercoppa Italiana | Napoli | 2–0 | Bologna | 3rd | 2014 |
| Kazakhstan | 2025 Kazakhstan Cup | Tobol | 2–0 | FC Ordabasy | 3rd | 2023 |
| Kazakhstan | 2025 Kazakhstan Super Cup | FC Kairat | 2–0 | FC Aktobe | 3rd | 2017 |
| Kazakhstan | 2025 Kazakhstan League Cup | | | | | |
| Kosovo | 2024–25 Kosovar Cup | Prishtina | 1–0 | Llapi | 9th | 2022–23 |
| Kosovo | 2025 Kosovar Supercup | Drita | 2–1 | Prishtina | 1st | —N/a |
| Latvia | 2025 Latvian Football Cup | Auda | 2–1 | Riga | 2nd | 2022 |
| Latvia | 2025 Latvian Supercup | FK RFS | 3–1 | Riga FC | 1st | —N/a |
| Liechtenstein | 2024–25 Liechtenstein Cup | Vaduz | 3–2 | Balzers | 51st | 2023–24 |
| Lithuania | 2025 Lithuanian Football Cup | Panevėžys | 1–0 | Hegelmann | 2nd | 2020 |
| Lithuania | 2025 Lithuanian Supercup | VMFD Zalgiris | 2–2 (3–2 p) | FK Banga | 9th | 2023 |
| Luxembourg | 2024–25 Luxembourg Cup | Differdange 03 | 2–2 (5–4 p) | F91 Dudelange | 6th | 2022–23 |
| Malta | 2024–25 Maltese FA Trophy | Hibernians | 2–1 | Birkirkara | 11th | 2012–13 |
| Malta | 2025 Maltese Super Cup | | | | | |
| Moldova | 2024–25 Moldovan Cup | Sheriff Tiraspol | 2–1 | Milsami Orhei | 13th | 2022–23 |
| Montenegro | 2024–25 Montenegrin Cup | Dečić | 1–0 | Mornar | 1st | —N/a |
| Netherlands | 2024–25 KNVB Cup | Go Ahead Eagles | 1–1 (4–2 p) | AZ | 1st | —N/a |
| Netherlands | 2025 Johan Cruyff Shield | PSV Eindhoven | 2–1 | Go Ahead Eagles | 15th | 2023 |
| North Macedonia | 2024–25 Macedonian Football Cup | Vardar | 2–0 | Struga | 6th | 2006–07 |
| Northern Ireland | 2024–25 Irish Cup | Dungannon Swifts | 1–1 (4–3 p) | Cliftonville | 1st | —N/a |
| Northern Ireland | 2025 NIFL Charity Shield | | | | | |
| Northern Ireland | 2024–25 Northern Ireland Football League Cup | Cliftonville | 1–0 (a.e.t.) | Glentoran | 7th | 2021–22 |
| Norway | 2025 Norwegian Football Cup | Lillestrøm | 3–1 | Sarpsborg 08 | 7th | 2017 |
| Poland | 2024–25 Polish Cup | Legia Warsaw | 4–3 | Pogoń Szczecin | 21st | 2022–23 |
| Poland | 2025 Polish Super Cup | Legia Warsaw | 2–1 | Lech Poznań | 6th | 2023 |
| Portugal | 2024–25 Taça de Portugal | Sporting CP | 3–1 (a.e.t.) | Benfica | 19th | 2018–19 |
| Portugal | 2024–25 Taça da Liga | Benfica | 1–1 (7–6 p) | Sporting CP | 8th | 2015–16 |
| Portugal | 2025 Supertaça Cândido de Oliveira | Benfica | 1–0 | Sporting CP | 10th | 2023 |
| Romania | 2025–25 Cupa României | CFR Cluj | 3–2 | FC Hermannstadt | 5th | 2015–16 |
| Romania | 2025 Supercupa României | FCSB | 2-1 | CFR Cluj | 8th | 2024-25 |
| Russia | 2024–25 Russian Cup | CSKA Moscow | 0–0 (4–3 p) | Rostov | 9th | 2022–23 |
| Russia | 2025 Russian Super Cup | CSKA Moscow | 1-0 | FC Krasnodar | 8th | 2018-19 |
| San Marino | 2024–25 Coppa Titano | Virtus | 1–0 | Tre Fiori | 2nd | 2022–23 |
| San Marino | 2025 Super Coppa Sammarinese | | | | | |
| Scotland | 2024–25 Scottish Cup | Aberdeen | 1–1 (4–3 p) | Celtic | 8th | 1989–90 |
| Scotland | 2024–25 Scottish League Cup | Celtic | 3–3 (5–4 p) | Rangers | 22nd | 2022–23 |
| Serbia | 2024–25 Serbian Cup | Red Star Belgrade | 3–0 | Vojvodina | 29th | 2023–24 |
| Slovakia | 2024–25 Slovak Cup | Spartak Trnava | 1–0 | MFK Ružomberok | 9th | 2022–23 |
| Slovenia | 2024–25 Slovenian Football Cup | Celje | 4–0 | Koper | 2nd | 2004–05 |
| Spain | 2024–25 Copa del Rey | Barcelona | 3–2 (a.e.t.) | Real Madrid | 32nd | 2020–21 |
| Spain | 2025 Supercopa de España | Barcelona | 5–2 | Real Madrid | 15th | 2023 |
| Sweden | 2024–25 Svenska Cupen | BK Häcken | 0–0 (5–4 p) | Malmö FF | 4th | 2022–23 |
| Switzerland | 2024–25 Swiss Cup | Basel | 4–1 | Biel-Bienne | 14th | 2018–19 |
| Turkey | 2024–25 Turkish Cup | Galatasaray | 3–0 | Trabzonspor | 19th | 2018–19 |
| Turkey | 2025 Turkish Super Cup | Fenerbahçe | 2–0 | Galatasaray | 10th | 2014 |
| Ukraine | 2024–25 Ukrainian Cup | Shakhtar Donetsk | 1–1 (a.e.t.) (6–5 p) | Dynamo Kyiv | 15th | 2023–24 |
| Wales | 2024–25 Welsh Cup | The New Saints | 2–1 | Connah's Quay Nomads | 10th | 2022–23 |
| Wales | 2024–25 Welsh League Cup | The New Saints | 1–0 | Aberystwyth Town | 11th | 2023–24 |

== Women's domestic leagues ==
=== AFC ===
| Nation | League | Champion | Second place | Title | Last honour |
|---|---|---|---|---|---|
| Australia | 2024–25 A-League Women (Note: In A-League Women and its male counterpart of A-League Men, the term "champion" refers to the winner of the finals series—i.e., the playoffs that follow the league season.) | Central Coast Mariners | Melbourne Victory | 1st (Note: Reflects wins in the A-League Women Grand Final, the last match of the finals series.) | —N/a |
| Japan | 2024–25 WE League season | Tokyo Verdy Beleza | INAC Kobe Leonessa | 1st | —N/a |
| Lebanon | 2024–25 Lebanese Women's Football League | BFA | ÓBerytus | 2nd | 2023–24 |
| Malaysia | 2024–25 National Women's League | Kelana United | Sabah FA | 1st | —N/a |
| Philippines | 2025 PFF Women's League | Kaya–Iloilo | Stallion Laguna | 2nd | 2023 |
| Singapore | 2025 Women's Premier League | Albirex Niigata (S) | Still Aerion | 1st | —N/a |
| Vietnam | 2025 Vietnamese Women's National League | Ho Chi Minh City I | Hanoi | 14th | 2024 |

=== CAF ===
| Nation | League | Champion | Second place | Title | Last honour |
|---|---|---|---|---|---|
| Algeria | 2024–25 Algerian Women's Championship | TBD – season in progress | | | |

=== CONCACAF ===
| Nation | League | Champion | Second place | Title | Last honour |
|---|---|---|---|---|---|
| Canada | 2025 Northern Super League (Note: Inaugural season.) | Vancouver Rise | AFC Toronto | 1st | —N/a |
| Mexico | 2025 Liga MX Femenil Clausura | Pachuca | América | 1st | —N/a |
| Mexico | 2025 Liga MX Femenil Apertura | UANL | América | 7th | 2023 Apertura |
| Puerto Rico | 2025 Liga Puerto Rico Femenino | Puerto Rico Caribbean Stars | Coamo | 1st | —N/a |
| Puerto Rico | 2025 Liga Puerto Rico Femenino Apertura | TBD – season in progress | | | |
| United States | 2025 NWSL season | Gotham FC | Washington Spirit | 3rd | 2023 |
| United States | 2024–25 USL Super League | Tampa Bay Sun | Fort Lauderdale United | 1st | —N/a |

=== CONMEBOL ===
| Nation | League | Champion | Second place | Title | Last honour |
|---|---|---|---|---|---|
| Argentina | 2025 Primera División A Apertura | Newell's Old Boys | Belgrano | 1st | —N/a |
| Argentina | 2025 Primera División A Clausura | | | | |
| Bolivia | 2025 Liga Femenina | Always Ready | Astor FC | 4th | 2024 |
| Brazil | 2025 Campeonato Brasileiro de Futebol Feminino Série A1 | Corinthians | Cruzeiro | 7th | 2024 |
| Chile | 2025 Campeonato Nacional Fútbol Femenino | | | | |
| Colombia | 2025 Liga Femenina | Deportivo Cali | Santa Fe | 3rd | 2024 |
| Ecuador | 2025 Superliga Femenina | Dragonas IDV | LDU Quito | 2nd | 2024 |
| Paraguay | 2025 Paraguayan Women's Football Championship | Libertad | Olimpia | 3rd | 2024 |
| Peru | 2025 Liga Femenina | | | | |
| Uruguay | 2025 Campeonato Uruguayo Femenino | | | | |
| Venezuela | 2025 Venezuelan Primera División Femenina | ADIFFEM | Deportivo Táchira | 2nd | 2024 |

=== OFC ===
| Nation | League | Champion | Second place | Title | Last honour |
|---|---|---|---|---|---|
| New Zealand | 2025 New Zealand Women's National League | | | | |

=== UEFA ===
| Nation | League | Champion | Second place | Title | Last honour |
|---|---|---|---|---|---|
| Austria | 2024–25 ÖFB Frauen Bundesliga | SKN St. Polten | Austria Wien | 10th | 2023–24 |
| Belarus | 2025 Belarusian Women's Premier League | | | | |
| Belgium | 2024–25 Belgian Women's Super League | Leuven | Anderlecht | 1st | —N/a |
| Croatia | 2024–25 Croatian Women's First Football League | Agram | Osijek | 1st | —N/a |
| Czech Republic | 2024–25 Czech Women's First League | Slavia Prague | Sparta Prague | 11th | 2023–24 |
| Denmark | 2024–25 Kvindeliga (Note: Renamed A-Liga after the 2024–25 season.) | Fortuna Hjørring | Nordsjælland | 11th | 2019–20 |
| England | 2024–25 Women's Super League | Chelsea | Arsenal | 8th | 2023–24 |
| France | 2024–25 Première Ligue (Note: Previously known as Division 1 Féminine.) | Lyon | Paris Saint-Germain | 18th | 2023–24 |
| Germany | 2024–25 Frauen-Bundesliga | Bayern Munich | VfL Wolfsburg | 7th (Note: Includes one West German championship predating the 1990 formation of the Frauen-Bundesliga.) | 2023–24 |
| Hungary | 2024–25 Női NB I | Ferencváros | Győr | 8th | 2023–24 |
| Iceland | 2025 Besta deild kvenna | Breiðablik | FH | 20th | 2024 |
| Italy | 2024–25 Women's Serie A | Juventus | Inter Milan | 6th | 2021–22 |
| Moldova | 2024–25 Moldovan Women Top League | Agarista-ȘS Anenii Noi | Nistru Cioburciu | 7th | 2023–24 |
| Netherlands | 2024–25 Vrouwen Eredivisie | Twente | PSV | 10th (Note: Includes three de facto Dutch championships, officially recognized by the KNVB, won as the highest-placed Dutch side during the 2012–2015 existence of the joint Belgian–Dutch BeNe League.) | 2023–24 |
| Norway | 2025 Toppserien | Brann | Vålerenga | 2nd | 2022 |
| Portugal | 2024–25 Campeonato Nacional Feminino | Benfica | Sporting CP | 5th | 2023–24 |
| Republic of Ireland | 2025 League of Ireland Women's Premier Division | Athlone Town | | 2nd | 2024 |
| Romania | 2024–25 Liga I | FCV Farul Constanța | FK Csíkszereda Miercurea Ciuc | 2nd | 2023–24 |
| Scotland | 2024–25 Scottish Women's Premier League | Hibernian | Glasgow City | 4th | 2006–07 |
| Spain | 2024–25 Liga F | Barcelona | Real Madrid | 10th | 2023–24 |
| Sweden | 2025 Damallsvenskan | Häcken | Hammarby | 2nd | 2020 |
| Switzerland | 2024–25 Swiss Women's Super League | YB Frauen | GC Zürich | 12th | 2010–11 |
| Turkey | 2024–25 Turkish Women's Super League | ABB Fomget | Fenerbahçe | 2nd | 2022–23 |
| Ukraine | 2024–25 Ukrainian Women's Top League | Vorskla Poltava | Metalist 1925 Kharkiv | 6th | 2023–24 |
| Wales | 2024–25 Adran Premier | Cardiff City | Briton Ferry Llansawel | 4th | 2023–24 |

== Women's domestic second to fourth leagues ==
=== AFC ===
| Nation | League | Champion | Second place | Title | Last honour |
|---|---|---|---|---|---|
| Australia | 2025 National Premier Leagues Victoria Women | Box Hill United | Heidelberg United | 7th | 2012 |
| Saudi Arabia | 2024–25 Saudi Women's First Division League | Neom | Abha | 1st | —N/a |
| Singapore | 2025 Women's National League | Mattar Sailors | Jungfrau Punggol | 2nd | 2024 |

=== UEFA ===
| Nation | League | Champion | Second place | Title | Last honour |
|---|---|---|---|---|---|
| Austria | 2024–25 2. Frauen Bundesliga | | | | |
| England | 2024–25 Women's Championship (Note: Renamed Women's Super League 2 after the 2024–25 season.) | London City Lionesses | Birmingham City | 1st | —N/a |
| England | 2024–25 FA Women's National League | Premier Division North: Nottingham Forest | Wolverhampton Wanderers | 3rd | 2022–23 |
| England | 2024–25 FA Women's National League | Premier Division South: Ipswich Town | Hashtag United | 1st | —N/a |
| England | 2024–25 FA Women's National League | Division One North: Middlesbrough | Cheadle Town Stingers | 2nd | 2015–16 |
| England | 2024–25 FA Women's National League | Division One Midlands: Loughborough Lightning | Northampton Town | 3rd | 2017–18 (as Loughborough Foxes) |
| England | 2024–25 FA Women's National League | Division One South East: Real Bedford | Norwich City | 1st | —N/a |
| England | 2024–25 FA Women's National League | Division One South West: AFC Bournemouth | Moneyfields | 1st | —N/a |
| France | 2024–25 Seconde Ligue | Marseille | Lens | 2nd | 2015–16 |
| Germany | 2024–25 2. Frauen-Bundesliga | Union Berlin | 1. FC Nürnberg | 1st | —N/a |
| Germany | 2024–25 Frauen-Regionalliga Nord | Hamburger SV II | VfL Wolfsburg II | | |
| Germany | 2024–25 Frauen-Regionalliga Nordost | Viktoria Berlin | Hertha BSC II | | |
| Germany | 2024–25 Frauen-Regionalliga Süd | VfB Stuttgart | TSG Hoffenheim II | | |
| Germany | 2024–25 Frauen-Regionalliga Südwest | 1. FSV Mainz 05 | 1. FC Saarbrücken | | |
| Germany | 2024–25 Frauen-Regionalliga West | VfR Warbeyen | Borussia Mönchengladbach II | 1st | —N/a |
| Italy | 2024–25 Serie B | Ternana | Parma | 1st | —N/a |
| Italy | 2024–25 Serie C | Group A: Spezia | Pro Sesto | 1st | —N/a |
| Italy | 2024–25 Serie C | Group B: Venezia | Südtirol | 1st | —N/a |
| Italy | 2024–25 Serie C | Group C: Trastevere | Roma CF | 1st | —N/a |
| Romania | 2024–25 Liga II | Serie 1 CSM Alexandria | Rapid București | 1st | —N/a |
| Romania | 2024–25 Liga II | Serie 2 Politehnica Timișoara | Roma Florin Pădurean | 2nd | 2023–24 |
| Romania | 2024–25 Liga III | Concordia Chiajna | Academia de Fotbal Floreşti | 1st | —N/a |
| Scotland | 2024–25 Scottish Women's Premier League 2 | Hamilton Academical | Kilmarnock | 2nd | 2016 |
| Scotland | 2024–25 Scottish Women's Championship | East Fife | Stirling University | 1st | —N/a |
| Scotland | 2024–25 Scottish Women's League One | Bonnyrigg Rose | Armadale Thistle | 1st | —N/a |
| Spain | 2024–25 Primera Federación | Alhama | Alavés | 2nd | 2021–22 (South Group) |
| Spain | 2024–25 Segunda Federación | North Group: CE Europa | Oviedo | 1st | —N/a |
| Spain | 2024–25 Segunda Federación | South Group: Fundación CD Tenerife | Tenerife B | 1st | —N/a |
| Ukraine | 2024–25 Ukrainian First League | Veres Rivne | FC Mynai | 1st | —N/a |

=== CONMEBOL ===
| Nation | Tournament | Champion | Second place | Title | Last honour |
|---|---|---|---|---|---|
| Brazil | 2025 Campeonato Brasileiro de Futebol Feminino Série A2 | | | | |
| Brazil | 2025 Campeonato Brasileiro de Futebol Feminino Série A3 | | | | |

== Women's domestic cups ==
=== AFC ===
| Nation | Cup | Champion | Final score | Second place | Title | Last honour |
|---|---|---|---|---|---|---|
| Japan | 2024 Empress's Cup | Urawa Red Diamonds Ladies | 1–1 (a.e.t.) (5–4 p) | Albirex Niigata Ladies | 2nd | 2021 |
| Philippines | 2025 PFF Women's Cup | | | | | |
| Vietnam | 2025 Vietnamese Women's National Cup | Hồ Chí Minh City | 1–0 | Thái Nguyên T&T | 4th | 2022 |

=== CAF ===
| Nation | Cup | Champion | Second place | Title | Last honour |
|---|---|---|---|---|---|
| Algeria | 2024–25 Algerian Women's Cup | | | | |

=== CONCACAF ===
| Nation | Cup | Champion | Final score | Second place | Title | Last honour |
|---|---|---|---|---|---|---|
| Canada | 2025 Inter-Provincial Championship | | | | | |
| United States | 2025 NWSL Challenge Cup | Washington Spirit | 1–1 (4–2 p) | Orlando Pride | 1st | —N/a |

=== CONMEBOL ===
| Nation | Cup | Champion | Final score | Second place | Title | Last honour |
|---|---|---|---|---|---|---|
| (Brazil) Brasil | 2025 Supercopa do Brasil de Futebol Feminino | São Paulo FC | 0–0 (4–3 p) | Corinthians | 1st | —N/a |
| (Brazil) Brasil | 2025 Copa do Brasil de Futebol Feminino | | | | | |

=== OFC ===
| Nation | Cup | Champion | Final score | Second place | Title | Last honour |
|---|---|---|---|---|---|---|
| New Zealand | 2025 Kate Sheppard Cup | Auckland United | 4–1 | Wellington Phoenix Reserves | 3rd | 2024 |

=== UEFA ===
| Nation | Cup | Champion | Final score | Second place | Title | Last honour |
|---|---|---|---|---|---|---|
| Austria | 2024–25 ÖFB Frauen Cup | St. Pölten | 2–1 | Austria Wien | 12th | 2023–24 |
| Belarus | 2025 Belarusian Women's Cup | | | | | |
| Belarus | 2025 Belarusian Women's Super Cup | Dinamo-BGU | 1–0 | FC Minsk | 4th | 2024 |
| Belgium | 2024–25 Belgian Women's Cup | Standard Liège | 1–0 | Anderlecht | 10th | 2022–2023 |
| Czech Republic | 2024–25 Czech Women's Cup | Slavia Prague | 2–1 | Sparta Prague | 6th | 2023–24 |
| Denmark | 2024–25 Danish Women's Cup | Fortuna Hjørring | 1–0 (a.e.t.) | FC Nordsjælland | 11th | 2018–19 |
| England | 2024–25 Women's FA Cup | Chelsea | 3–0 | Manchester United | 6th | 2022–23 |
| England | 2024–25 Women's League Cup | Chelsea | 2–1 | Manchester City | 3rd | 2020–21 |
| Estonia | 2024–25 Estonian Women's Cup | FC Flora | 4–0 | Saku Sporting | 10th | 2023–24 |
| France | 2024–25 Coupe de France Féminine | Paris FC | 0–0 (5–4 p) | PSG | 2nd | 2004–05 |
| Germany | 2024–25 DFB-Pokal Frauen | Bayern Munich | 4–2 | Werder Bremen | 2nd | 2011–12 |
| Hungary | 2024–25 Hungarian Women's Cup | Győri ETO | 2–2 (3–1 p) | MTK Hungária | 4th | 2023–2024 |
| Iceland | 2025 Icelandic Women's Football Super Cup | Valur | 1–0 | Breiðablik | 9th | 2022 |
| Iceland | 2025 Icelandic Women's Football League Cup | Breiðablik | 4–1 | Þór/KA | 10th | 2024 |
| Israel | 2024–25 Israeli Women's Cup | Kiryat Gat | 1–0 | Hapoel Jerusalem | 5th | 2021–2022 |
| Italy | 2024–25 Coppa Italia | Juventus FC | 4–0 | AS Roma | 4th | 2022–23 |
| Moldova | 2024–25 Moldovan Women's Cup | Agarista Anenii Noi | 1–0 | Nistru Cioburciu | 7th | 2023–24 |
| Moldova | 2024–25 LFFM Cup | Atletico Bălți | 1–0 | Nistru Cioburciu | 1st | —N/a |
| Netherlands | 2024–25 KNVB Women's Cup | FC Twente | 2–1 | PSV Eindhoven | 4th | 2022–23 |
| Netherlands | 2024–25 Eredivisie Cup | PSV Eindhoven | 3–3 (a.e.t.) (4–3 p) | FC Twente | 1st | —N/a |
| Poland | 2024–25 Polish Women's Cup | Czarni Sosnowiec | 1–1 (a.e.t.) (4–3 p) | Pogoń Szczecin | 14th | 2021–22 |
| Russia | 2025 Russian Women's Super Cup | Zenit Saint Petersburg | 3–0 | Lokomotiv Moscow | 1st | —N/a |
| Slovakia | 2024–25 Slovak Women's Cup | Spartak Myjava | 5–1 | Slovan Bratislava | 3rd | 2023–24 |
| Slovenia | 2024–25 Slovenian Women's Cup | ŽNK Ljubljana | 1–0 | Mura | 1st | —N/a |
| Spain | 2024–25 Copa de la Reina de Fútbol | Barcelona | 2–0 | Atlético Madrid | 11th | 2023–24 |
| Spain | 2024–25 Supercopa de España Femenina | Barcelona | 5–0 | Real Madrid | 5th | 2023–24 |
| Scotland | 2024–25 Women's Scottish Cup | Rangers | 2–0 | Hearts | 1st | —N/a |
| Scotland | 2024–25 Scottish Women's Premier League Cup | Rangers | 5–0 | Hibernian | 3rd | 2023–24 |
| Switzerland | 2024–25 Swiss Women's Cup | FC Zürich | 1–0 | FC Basel | 16th | 2022 |
| Wales | 2024–25 FAW Women's Cup | Cardiff City | 3–1 | Wrexham | 5th | 2023–24 |
| Wales | 2024–25 Adran Trophy | The New Saints | 3–1 | Swansea | 1st | —N/a |

== Tier II to V domestic leagues ==
=== AFC ===
| Nation | Tier | League | Champion | Second place | Title | Last honour |
|---|---|---|---|---|---|---|
| Australia | II Tier | 2025 National Premier Leagues Capital Football | Tigers FC | Monaro Panthers | 1st | |
| Australia | II Tier | 2025 National Premier Leagues NSW | APIA Leichhardt | Rockdale Ilinden | 7th | 2023 |
| Australia | II Tier | 2025 National Premier Leagues Northern NSW | Broadmeadow Magic | Lambton Jaffas | 9th | 2024 |
| Australia | II Tier | 2025 National Premier Leagues Queensland | Moreton City Excelsior | Lions FC | 2nd | 2015 |
| Australia | II Tier | 2025 National Premier Leagues South Australia | North Eastern MetroStars | Croydon FC | 5th | 2012 |
| Australia | II Tier | 2025 National Premier Leagues Tasmania | South Hobart | Launceston City | 20th | 2017 |
| Australia | II Tier | 2025 National Premier Leagues Victoria | Heidelberg United | Dandenong City | 6th | 2018 |
| Australia | II Tier | 2025 National Premier Leagues Western Australia | Bayswater City | Olympic Kingsway | 5th | 2017 |
| Australia | III Tier | 2025 Victoria Premier League 1 | Bentleigh Greens | Caroline Springs George Cross | 1st | - |
| Australia | IV Tier | 2025 Victoria Premier League 2 | North Geelong Warriors | Eltham Redbacks | 1st | - |
| India | II Tier | 2024–25 I-League | Churchill Brothers | Inter Kashi | 3rd | 2012–13 |
| India | III Tier | 2024–25 I-League 2 | Diamond Harbour | Chanmari | 1st | —N/a |
| India | IV Tier | 2024–25 I-League 3 | Diamond Harbour | Chanmari | 1st | —N/a |
| India | V tier | 2024–25 Delhi Premier League | | | | |
| India | V tier | 2024–25 Punjab State Super League | | | | |
| India | V tier | 2024–25 Haryana Men's Football League | | | | |
| India | V tier | 2024–25 Manipur State League | | | | |
| India | V tier | 2024–25 Goa Professional League | | | | |
| India | V tier | 2024–25 BDFA Super Division; FC Agniputhra | Kickstart FC | | 1st | —N/a |
| India | V tier | 2024–25 Mumbai Premier League | | | | |
| Indonesia | II Tier | 2024–25 Liga 2 | PSIM | Bhayangkara Presisi | 1st | —N/a |
| Indonesia | III Tier | 2024–25 Liga Nusantara | Sumut United | Tornado | 1st | —N/a |
| Indonesia | IV Tier | 2024–25 Liga 4 | Tri Brata Rafflesia | Persika | 1st | —N/a |
| Iran | II Tier | 2024–25 Azadegan League | Fajr Sepasi | Paykan | 2nd | 2020–21 |
| Japan | II Tier | 2025 J2 League | Mito HollyHock | V-Varen Nagasaki | 1st | —N/a |
| Japan | III Tier | 2025 J3 League | Tochigi City FC | Vanraure Hachinohe | 1st | —N/a |
| Japan | IV Tier | 2025 Japan Football League | Honda FC | Reilac Shiga FC | 11th | 2023 |
| Japan | V Tier | 2025 Japanese Regional Football Champions League | J-Lease FC | Vonds Ichihara | 1st | —N/a |
| Kuwait | II Tier | 2025 Kuwaiti Division One | Al-Jahra | Al-Shabab | 5th | 2021–22 |
| Lebanon | II Tier | 2024–25 Lebanese Second Division | Jwaya | Mabarra | 1st | —N/a |
| Lebanon | III Tier | 2024–25 Lebanese Third Division | Ittihad Haret Naameh | Hilal Nasr | 1st | —N/a |
| Malaysia | II Tier | 2024–25 Malaysia A1 Semi-Pro League | Melaka | Immigration | 1st | —N/a |
| Malaysia | III Tier | 2024–25 Malaysia A2 Amateur League | Guar Syed Alwi | Kelantan WTS | 1st | —N/a |
| Nepal | II Tier | 2025 Martyr's Memorial B-Division League | Planning Boyz United | Shree Bhagwati Club | 1st | —N/a |
| Nepal | III Tier | 2024–25 Martyr's Memorial C-Division League | Bagmati Youth Club | RC32 Football Academy | 1st | —N/a |
| Qatar | II Tier | 2024–25 Qatari Second Division | Al-Sailiya | Al-Markhiya | 5th | 2011–12 |
| Saudi Arabia | II Tier | 2024–25 Saudi First Division League | Neom | | 1st | —N/a |
| Saudi Arabia | III Tier | 2024–25 Saudi Second Division League | Al-Diriyah Club | Al-Ula | 2nd | 2012–13 |
| Saudi Arabia | IV Tier | 2024–25 Saudi Third Division | Al-Qala | Jubbah | 1st | —N/a |
| Saudi Arabia | V Tier | 2024–25 Saudi Fourth Division | | | | |
| Singapore | II Tier | 2025 Singapore Football League 1 | Singapore Cricket Club | Jungfrau Punggol | 2nd | 2009 |
| Singapore | III Tier | 2025 Singapore Football League 2 | Bishan Barx | South Avenue | 1st | —N/a |
| Singapore | IV Tier | 2025 Island Wide League | Gymkhana | Tanah Merah United | 1st | —N/a |
| Thailand | II Tier | 2024–25 Thai League 2 | Chonburi | Ayutthaya United | 1st | —N/a |
| Thailand | III Tier | 2024–25 Thai League 3 | Rasisalai United | Songkhla | 1st | —N/a |
| Thailand | IV Tier | 2025 Thailand Semi-pro League | Banbueng City | Samui United | 1st | —N/a |
| Uzbekistan | II Tier | 2025 Uzbekistan First League | | | | |
| Uzbekistan | III Tier | 2025 Uzbekistan Second League | | | | |
| Vietnam | II Tier | 2024–25 V.League 2 | Phu Dong Ninh Binh | Truong Tuoi Binh Phuoc | 1st | —N/a |
| Vietnam | III Tier | 2025 Vietnamese Football League Second Division | Group A: Quang Ninh | Bac Ninh | 1st | —N/a |
| Vietnam | III Tier | 2025 Vietnamese Football League Second Division | Group B: Văn Hiến University | Gia Dinh | 1st | —N/a |
| Vietnam | IV Tier | 2025 Vietnamese Football League Third Division | Group A: Phù Đổng | Công An Hà Nội B | 1st | —N/a |
| Vietnam | IV Tier | 2025 Vietnamese Football League Third Division | Group B: Hà Tĩnh | Khánh Hòa B | 1st | —N/a |
| Vietnam | IV Tier | 2025 Vietnamese Football League Third Division | Group C: Trường Giang-Gia Định | Đồng Tháp B | 1st | —N/a |

=== CAF ===
| Nation | Tier | League | Champion | Second place | Title | Last honour |
|---|---|---|---|---|---|---|
| Algeria | II Tier | 2024–25 Algerian Ligue 2 | Group Centre-east: MB Rouissat | USM El Harrach | 1st | —N/a |
| Algeria | II Tier | 2024–25 Algerian Ligue 2 | Group Centre-west: ES Ben Aknoun | RC Kouba | 2nd | 2022–23 |

=== CONCACAF ===
| Nation | Tier | League | Champion | Second place | Title | Last honour |
|---|---|---|---|---|---|---|
| Canada | III Tier | 2025 Canadian Soccer League | Scarborough SC | Serbian White Eagles | 3rd | 2021 |
| Canada | III Tier | 2025 League1 Alberta | Calgary Blizzard SC | St. Albert Impact | 1st | |
| Canada | III Tier | 2025 League1 British Columbia | Langley United | TSS FC Rovers | 1st | |
| Canada | III Tier | 2025 League1 Ontario | League1 Ontario Premier | | | |
| Canada | III Tier | 2025 League1 Ontario | League1 Ontario Championship | | | |
| Canada | III Tier | 2025 League1 Ontario | League2 Ontario | | | |
| Canada | III Tier | 2025 Ligue1 Québec | Ligue1 Québec: CS Saint-Laurent | AS Laval | 2nd | 2023 |
| Canada | III Tier | 2025 Ligue1 Québec | Ligue2 Québec: CS LaSalle | AS Gatineau | 1st | |
| Canada | III Tier | 2025 Ligue1 Québec | Ligue3 Québec: CS Longueuil B | CS Fury de Rimouski | 1st | |
| El Salvador | II Tier | 2025 Segunda División de Fútbol Salvadoreño Clausura | Zacatecoluca | Fuerte Aguilares | 2nd | 2024 Apertura |
| Mexico | II Tier | 2025 Liga de Expansión MX Clausura | Leones Negros UdeG | Jaiba Brava | 1st | —N/a |
| Mexico | II Tier | 2025 Liga de Expansión MX Apertura | Jaiba Brava | CD Irapuato | 2nd | 2020 Guardianes |
| Mexico | III Tier | 2025 Serie A de México Clausura | Irapuato | Aguacateros de Peribán | 2nd | 2020–21 |
| Mexico | III Tier | 2025 Serie A de México Apertura | | | | |
| Mexico | III Tier | 2025 Serie B de México Clausura | Santiago | Atlético Pachuca | 2nd | 2024 Apertura |
| Mexico | III Tier | 2025 Serie B de México Apertura | | | | |
| Mexico | IV Tier | 2024–25 Liga TDP season | | | | |
| United States | II Tier | 2025 USL Championship | Pittsburgh Riverhounds | FC Tulsa | 1st | —N/a |
| United States | III Tier | 2025 MLS Next Pro | New York Red Bulls II | Colorado Rapids 2 | 1st | —N/a |
| United States | III Tier | 2025 USL League One | One Knoxville SC | Spokane Velocity | 1st | —N/a |
| United States | IV Tier | 2025 USL League Two | Vermont Green FC | Ballard FC | 1st | —N/a |

=== CONMEBOL ===
| Nation | Tier | League | Champion | Second place | Title | Last honour |
|---|---|---|---|---|---|---|
| Argentina | II Tier | 2025 Primera Nacional | Gimnasia y Esgrima (M) | Deportivo Madryn | 1st | —N/a |
| Argentina | III Tier | 2025 Primera B | | | | |
| Argentina | III Tier | 2025 Torneo Federal A | | | | |
| Argentina | IV Tier | 2025 Primera C | | | | |
| (Brazil) Brasil | II Tier | 2025 Campeonato Brasileiro Serie B | | | | |
| (Brazil) Brasil | III Tier | 2025 Campeonato Brasileiro Serie C | | | | |
| (Brazil) Brasil | IV Tier | 2025 Campeonato Brasileiro Serie D | | | | |
| (Brazil) Brasil | Regional Tournaments | 2025 Campeonato Acriano | Independência | Galvez | 13th | 2024 |
| (Brazil) Brasil | Regional Tournaments | 2025 Campeonato Amapaense | | | | |
| (Brazil) Brasil | Regional Tournaments | 2025 Campeonato Amazonense | | | | |
| (Brazil) Brasil | Regional Tournaments | 2025 Campeonato Alagoano | CRB | ASA | 35th | 2024 |
| (Brazil) Brasil | Regional Tournaments | 2025 Campeonato Baiano | Bahia | Vitória | 54th | 2023 |
| (Brazil) Brasil | Regional Tournaments | 2025 Campeonato Brasiliense | Gama | Capital-DF | 11th | 2020 |
| (Brazil) Brasil | Regional Tournaments | 2025 Campeonato Capixaba | Rio Branco/ES | Porto Vitória/ES | 39th | 2024 |
| (Brazil) Brasil | Regional Tournaments | 2025 Campeonato Carioca | Flamengo | Fluminense | 39th | 2024 |
| (Brazil) Brasil | Regional Tournaments | 2025 Campeonato Catarinense | Avaí | Chapecoense | 19th | 2021 |
| (Brazil) Brasil | Regional Tournaments | 2025 Campeonato Cearense | Ceará | Fortaleza | 47th | 2024 |
| (Brazil) Brasil | Regional Tournaments | 2025 Campeonato Gaúcho | Internacional | Grêmio | 46th | 2016 |
| (Brazil) Brasil | Regional Tournaments | 2025 Campeonato Goiano | Vila Nova | Anápolis | 16th | 2005 |
| (Brazil) Brasil | Regional Tournaments | 2025 Campeonato Maranhense | | | | |
| (Brazil) Brasil | Regional Tournaments | 2025 Campeonato Mato-Grossense | Primavera | Cuiabá | 1st | —N/a |
| (Brazil) Brasil | Regional Tournaments | 2025 Campeonato Mineiro | Atlético Mineiro | América Mineiro | 50th | 2024 |
| (Brazil) Brasil | Regional Tournaments | 2025 Campeonato Paulista | Corinthians | Palmeiras | 31st | 2019 |
| (Brazil) Brasil | Regional Tournaments | 2025 Campeonato Paranaense | Operário-PR | Maringá | 2nd | 2015 |
| (Brazil) Brasil | Regional Tournaments | 2025 Campeonato Paraense | | | | |
| (Brazil) Brasil | Regional Tournaments | 2025 Campeonato Paraibano | Sousa | Botafogo | 4th | 2024 |
| (Brazil) Brasil | Regional Tournaments | 2025 Campeonato Pernambucano | | | | |
| (Brazil) Brasil | Regional Tournaments | 2025 Campeonato Piauiense | Piauí | Fluminense-PI | 6th | 1985 |
| (Brazil) Brasil | Regional Tournaments | 2025 Campeonato Potiguar | América de Natal | ABC | 39th | 2024 |
| (Brazil) Brasil | Regional Tournaments | 2025 Campeonato Rondoniense | | | | |
| (Brazil) Brasil | Regional Tournaments | 2025 Campeonato Roraimense | GAS | Monte Roraima | 2nd | 2024 |
| (Brazil) Brasil | Regional Tournaments | 2025 Campeonato Sergipano | Confiança | Itabaiana | 24th | 2024 |
| (Brazil) Brasil | Regional Tournaments | 2025 Campeonato Sul-Mato-Grossense | | | | |
| (Brazil) Brasil | Regional Tournaments | 2025 Campeonato Tocantinense | União/TO | Araguaína/TO | 3rd | 2024 |
| (Brazil) Brasil | Regional Tournaments (II Tier) | 2025 Campeonato Baiano Second Division | | | | |
| (Brazil) Brasil | Regional Tournaments (II Tier) | 2025 Campeonato Cearense Série B | | | | |
| (Brazil) Brasil | Regional Tournaments (II Tier) | 2025 Campeonato Paulista Série A2 | Capivariano | Primavera | 2nd | 2014 |
| (Brazil) Brasil | Regional Tournaments (II Tier) | 2025 Campeonato Paranaense Second Division | | | | |
| (Brazil) Brasil | Regional Tournaments (II Tier) | 2025 Campeonato Sergipano Série A2 | | | | |
| (Brazil) Brasil | Regional Tournaments (III Tier) | 2025 Campeonato Paulista Série A3 | | | | |
| (Brazil) Brasil | Regional Tournaments (IV Tier) | 2025 Campeonato Paulista Série A4 | | | | |
| Chile | II Tier | 2025 Primera B | Universidad de Concepción | Deportes Copiapó | 2nd | 2013 |
| Chile | III Tier | 2025 Segunda División | | | | |
| Colombia | II Tier | 2025 Categoría Primera B Torneo I | Jaguares | Patriotas | 2nd | 2014 |
| Colombia | II Tier | 2025 Categoría Primera B Torneo II | Cúcuta Deportivo | Real Cundinamarca | 4th | 2018 |
| Ecuador | II Tier | 2025 Ecuadorian Serie B | Guayaquil City | Leones | 1st | —N/a |
| Paraguay | II Tier | 2025 División Intermedia | Rubio Ñu | San Lorenzo | 8th | 2008 |
| Peru | II Tier | 2025 Liga 2 | Cajamarca | Deportivo Moquegua | 1st | —N/a |
| Peru | III Tier | 2025 Liga 3 | Sport Huancayo II | Estudiantil CNI | 1st | —N/a |
| Peru | IV Tier | 2025 Copa Perú | Unión Minas | ANBA Perú | 1st | —N/a |
| Uruguay | II Tier | 2025 Segunda División | Albion | Central Español | 2nd | 2021 |
| Venezuela | II Tier | 2025 Liga FUTVE 2 | Trujillanos | Titanes | 2nd | 1988–89 |

=== OFC ===
| Nation | Tier | League | Champion | Second place | Title | Last honour |
|---|---|---|---|---|---|---|
| New Zealand | II Tier | 2025 Northern League | Western Springs | Birkenhead United | 1st | —N/a |
| New Zealand | II Tier | 2025 Central League | Wellington Olympic | Miramar Rangers | 7th | 2024 |
| New Zealand | II Tier | 2025 Southern League | Coastal Spirit | Christchurch United | 1st | —N/a |
| New Zealand | III Tier | 2025 NRFL Leagues | (Championship) Manukau United | Melville United | 1st | —N/a |
| New Zealand | III Tier | 2025 Central League 2 | FC Western | Palmerston North United | 1st | —N/a |
| New Zealand | III Tier | 2025 Nelson Bays Premiership | FC Nelson | Rangers | 6th | 2023 |
| New Zealand | III Tier | 2025 Canterbury Premiership | Christchurch United U20 Reserves | Halswell United | 1st | —N/a |
| New Zealand | III Tier | 2025 Southern Premiership | Northern | Otago University | 1st | —N/a |
| New Zealand | IV Tier | 2025 NRFL Leagues | (Northern Conference) Northland | Central United | 2nd | 2004 |
| New Zealand | IV Tier | 2025 NRFL Leagues | (Southern Conference) Taupo | Northern United | 2nd | 1999 |
| New Zealand | IV Tier | 2025 Central Federation League | (Eastern Conference) Havelock North Wanderers | Napier City Rovers Reserves | 1st | —N/a |
| New Zealand | IV Tier | 2025 Central Federation League | (Western Conference) Whanganui Athletic | Levin | 1st | —N/a |
| New Zealand | IV Tier | 2025 Capital Premier | Wellington Olympic Reserves | Wellington Phoenix Thirds | 4th | 2024 |
| New Zealand | IV Tier | 2025 Canterbury Championship | Selwyn United Turkeys | Ferrymead Bays Keen Lads | 1st | —N/a |
| New Zealand | IV Tier | 2025 Fletcher Cup | Northern Reserves | Dunedin City Royals Thirds | 1st | —N/a |
| New Zealand | IV Tier | 2025 Donald Gray Cup | Winton | Old Boy' Reserves | 1st | —N/a |
| New Zealand | IV Tier | 2025 South Canterbury Div 1 | Timaru Boys' High School | Timaru United | 4th | 2022 |

=== UEFA ===
| Nation | Tier | League | Champion | Second place | Title | Last honour |
|---|---|---|---|---|---|---|
| Albania | II Tier | 2024–25 Kategoria e Parë | Vora | Flamurtari | 1st | —N/a |
| Albania | III Tier | 2024–25 Kategoria e Dytë | Iliria | Luftëtari | 2nd | 2013–14 |
| Albania | IV Tier | 2024–25 Kategoria e Tretë | Bylis B | Eagle FA | 1st | —N/a |
| Andorra | II Tier | 2024–25 Segona Divisió | CE Carroi | CF Atlètic Amèrica | 1st | —N/a |
| Armenia | II Tier | 2024–25 Armenian First League | FC BKMA Yerevan II | FC Syunik | 1st | —N/a |
| Austria | II Tier | 2024–25 Austrian Football Second League | SV Ried | Admira Wacker | 3rd | 2019–20 |
| Austria | III Tier | 2024–25 Austrian Regionalliga | West Region: Donaufeld | FK Austria Wien II | 1st | —N/a |
| Austria | III Tier | 2024–25 Austrian Regionalliga | Center Region: Hertha Wels | Union Gurten | 1st | —N/a |
| Austria | III Tier | 2024–25 Austrian Regionalliga | East Region: Austria Salzburg | SC Imst | 7th | 2023-24 |
| Austria | IV Tier | 2024–25 Austrian Landesliga | Burgenland: | | | |
| Austria | IV Tier | 2024–25 Austrian Landesliga | Niederösterreich: | | | |
| Austria | IV Tier | 2024–25 Austrian Landesliga | Wiener Stadtliga: | | | |
| Austria | IV Tier | 2024–25 Austrian Landesliga | Kärntner Liga: | | | |
| Austria | IV Tier | 2024–25 Austrian Landesliga | OÖ Liga: | | | |
| Austria | IV Tier | 2024–25 Austrian Landesliga | Landesliga Steiermark: | | | |
| Austria | IV Tier | 2024–25 Austrian Landesliga | Salzburger Liga: | | | |
| Austria | IV Tier | 2024–25 Austrian Landesliga | Tiroler Liga: | | | |
| Austria | IV Tier | 2024–25 Austrian Landesliga | Vorarlbergliga: | | | |
| Azerbaijan | II Tier | 2024–25 Azerbaijan First Division | Qəbələ | | 2nd | 2005–06 |
| Belarus | II Tier | 2025 Belarusian First League | | | | |
| Belarus | III Tier | 2025 Belarusian Second League | | | | |
| Belgium | II Tier | 2024–25 Challenger Pro League | | | | |
| Belgium | III Tier | 2024–25 Belgian Division 1 | VV: Jong KAA Gent | Knokke | 1st | —N/a |
| Belgium | III Tier | 2024–25 Belgian Division 1 | ACFF | | | |
| Belgium | IV Tier | 2024–25 Belgian Division 2 | Belgian Division 2 VV A: Roeselare | | 1st | —N/a |
| Belgium | IV Tier | 2024–25 Belgian Division 2 | Belgian Division 2 VV B | | | |
| Belgium | IV Tier | 2024–25 Belgian Division 2 | Belgian Division 2 ACFF | | | |
| Belgium | V Tier | 2024–25 Belgian Division 3 | Belgian Division 3 VV A | | | |
| Belgium | V Tier | 2024–25 Belgian Division 3 | Belgian Division 3 VV B Londerzeel | | 1st | —N/a |
| Belgium | V Tier | 2024–25 Belgian Division 3 | Belgian Division 3 ACFF A Braine | | 1st | —N/a |
| Belgium | V Tier | 2024–25 Belgian Division 3 | Belgian Division 3 ACFF B Richelle United | | 1st | —N/a |
| Bosnia and Herzegovina | II Tier | 2024–25 First League of the Federation of Bosnia and Herzegovina | | | | |
| Bosnia and Herzegovina | II Tier | 2024–25 First League of the Republika Srpska | | | | |
| England | II Tier | 2024–25 EFL Championship | Leeds United | Burnley | 2nd | 2019–20 |
| England | III Tier | 2024–25 EFL League One | Birmingham City | Wrexham | 1st | —N/a |
| England | IV Tier | 2024–25 EFL League Two | Doncaster Rovers | Port Vale | 1st | —N/a |
| England | V Tier | 2024–25 National League | National League: Barnet | York City | 4th | 2014–15 |
| England | VI Tier | 2024–25 National League | National League North: Brackley Town | Scunthorpe United | 1st | —N/a |
| England | VI Tier | 2024–25 National League | National League South: Truro City | Torquay United | 1st | —N/a |
| France | II Tier | 2024–25 Ligue 2 | Lorient | Paris FC | 2nd | 2019–20 |
| France | III Tier | 2024–25 Championnat National | Nancy | Le Mans | 1st | —N/a |
| France | IV Tier | 2024–25 Championnat National 2 | Group A: Le Puy | Cannes | 3rd | 2021–22 |
| France | IV Tier | 2024–25 Championnat National 2 | Group B: Stade Briochin | Les Herbiers | 2nd | 2019–20 |
| France | IV Tier | 2024–25 Championnat National 2 | Group C: Fleury | FC 93 | 1st | —N/a |
| Germany | II Tier | 2024–25 2. Bundesliga | 1. FC Köln | Hamburger SV | 5th | 2018–19 |
| Germany | III Tier | 2024–25 3. Liga | Arminia Bielefeld | Dynamo Dresden | 2nd | 2014–15 |
| Germany | IV Tier | 2024–25 Regionalliga Nord | TSV Havelse | Kickers Emden | 1st | —N/a |
| Germany | IV Tier | 2024–25 Regionalliga Nordost | Lokomotive Leipzig | Hallescher FC | 2nd | 2019–20 |
| Germany | IV Tier | 2024–25 Regionalliga West | MSV Duisburg | FC Gütersloh | 1st | —N/a |
| Germany | IV Tier | 2024–25 Regionalliga Südwest | TSG Hoffenheim II | Kickers Offenbach | 1st | —N/a |
| Germany | IV Tier | 2024–25 Regionalliga Bayern | 1. FC Schweinfurt | TSV Buchbach | 1st | —N/a |
| Greece | II Tier | 2024–25 Super League Greece 2 | North Group: AEL | Iraklis | 5th | 2015–16 |
| Greece | II Tier | 2024–25 Super League Greece 2 | South Group: Kifisia | Kalamata | 2nd | 2022–23 |
| Greece | III Tier | 2024–25 Gamma Ethniki | Group 1: Nestos Chrysoupoli | Panthrakikos | 1st | —N/a |
| Greece | III Tier | 2024–25 Gamma Ethniki | Group 2: Anagennisi Karditsa | Pierikos | 1st | —N/a |
| Greece | III Tier | 2024–25 Gamma Ethniki | Group 3: Ellas Syros | Korinthos | 1st | —N/a |
| Greece | III Tier | 2024–25 Gamma Ethniki | Group 4: Marko 1927 | Ethnikos Piraeus | 1st | —N/a |
| Italy | II Tier | 2024–25 Serie B | Sassuolo | Pisa | 2nd | 2012–13 |
| Italy | III Tier | 2024–25 Serie C | Group A (North): Padova | Vicenza | 3rd | 2017–18 |
| Italy | III Tier | 2024–25 Serie C | Group B (Centre): Virtus Entella | Ternana | 2nd | 2018–19 |
| Italy | III Tier | 2024–25 Serie C | Group C (South): Avellino | Audace Cerignola | 3rd | 1972–73 |
| Italy | IV Tier | 2024–25 Serie D | Group A: Bra | NovaRomentino | 1st | —N/a |
| Italy | IV Tier | 2024–25 Serie D | Group B: Ospitaletto | Pro Palazzolo | 2nd | 1986-87 |
| Italy | IV Tier | 2024–25 Serie D | Group C: Dolomiti Bellunesi | Treviso | 1st | —N/a |
| Italy | IV Tier | 2024–25 Serie D | Group D: Forlì | Ravenna FC | 4th | 2011-12 |
| Italy | IV Tier | 2024–25 Serie D | Group E: Livorno | Fulgens Foligno | 2nd | 1983–84 |
| Italy | IV Tier | 2024–25 Serie D | Group F: Sambenedettese | L'Aquila | 1st | —N/a |
| Italy | IV Tier | 2024–25 Serie D | Group G: Guidonia Montecelio | Gelbison | 1st | —N/a |
| Italy | IV Tier | 2024–25 Serie D | Group H: Casarano | Nocerina | 2nd | 1987–88 |
| Italy | IV Tier | 2024–25 Serie D | Group I: Siracusa | Reggina | 4th | 2015-16 |
| Moldova | II Tier | 2024–25 Moldovan Liga 1 | Dacia Buiucani | Saksan | 3rd | 2022–23 |
| Moldova | III Tier | 2024–25 Moldovan Liga 2 | North: Zimbru-2 Chișinău | EFA Visoca | 1st | —N/a |
| Moldova | III Tier | 2024–25 Moldovan Liga 2 | South: Real Sireți | Oguzsport Comrat | 1st | —N/a |
| Netherlands | II Tier | 2024–25 Eerste Divisie | FC Volendam | Excelsior | 7th | 2007–08 |
| Netherlands | III Tier | 2024–25 Tweede Divisie | Quick Boys | | 1st | —N/a |
| Netherlands | IV Tier | 2024–25 Derde Divisie | Derde Divisie A: IJsselmeervogels | | 3rd | 2016–17 |
| Netherlands | IV Tier | 2024–25 Derde Divisie | Derde Divisie B: Hoek | | 1st | —N/a |
| Netherlands | V Tier | 2024–25 Vierde Divisie | Vierde Divisie A: Scherpenzeel | | 1st | —N/a |
| Netherlands | V Tier | 2024–25 Vierde Divisie | Vierde Divisie B: Zwaluwen | | 1st | —N/a |
| Netherlands | V Tier | 2024–25 Vierde Divisie | Vierde Divisie C: UDI '19 | | 1st | —N/a |
| Netherlands | V Tier | 2024–25 Vierde Divisie | Vierde Divisie D: Hoogeveen | | 2nd | 2022–23 |
| Poland | II Tier | 2024–25 I liga | Arka Gdynia | Bruk-Bet Termalica Nieciecza | 4th | 2015–16 |
| Poland | III Tier | 2024–25 II liga | Polonia Bytom | Pogoń Grodzisk Mazowiecki | 1st | —N/a |
| Poland | IV Tier | 2024–25 III liga | Group 1 Unia Skierniewice | | 1st | —N/a |
| Poland | IV Tier | 2024–25 III liga | Group 2 Sokół Kleczew | | 1st | —N/a |
| Poland | IV Tier | 2024–25 III liga | Group 3 Śląsk Wrocław II | | 2nd | 2019–20 |
| Poland | IV Tier | 2024–25 III liga | Group 4 Sandecja Nowy Sącz | | 1st | —N/a |
| Romania | II Tier | 2024–25 Liga II | Argeș Pitești | Steaua București | 5th | 2007–08 |
| Romania | III Tier | 2024–25 Liga III | | | | |
| Romania | IV Tier | 2024–25 Liga IV | | | | |
| Romania | V Tier | 2024–25 Liga V | | | | |
| Russia | II Tier | 2024–25 Russian First League | Baltika Kaliningrad | Torpedo Moscow | 2nd | 1995 |
| Russia | III Tier | 2024–25 Russian Second League Division A | | | | |
| Russia | IV Tier | 2025 Russian Second League Division B | | | | |
| Russia | V Tier | 2025 Russian Third League | | | | |
| Scotland | II Tier | 2024–25 Scottish Championship | Falkirk | Livingston | 8th | 2004–05 |
| Scotland | III Tier | 2024–25 Scottish League One | Arbroath | Cove Rangers | 2nd | 2018–19 |
| Scotland | IV Tier | 2024–25 Scottish League Two | Peterhead | East Fife | 3rd | 2018–19 |
| Scotland | V Tier | 2024–25 Highland League | Brora Rangers | Brechin City | 5th | 2020–21 |
| Scotland | V Tier | 2024–25 Lowland League | East Kilbride | Celtic B | 4th | 2023–24 |
| Slovakia | II Tier | 2024–25 2. Liga | Tatran Prešov | Zlaté Moravce | 3rd | 2015–16 |
| Slovakia | III Tier | 2024–25 3. Liga | West: ŠKF Sereď | Promotion Play-Off: | | |
| Slovakia | III Tier | 2024–25 3. Liga | Eastern: Slávia TU Košice | Promotion Play-Off: | | |
| Slovakia | IV Tier | 2024–25 4. Liga | Bratislava: MŠK Senec | | 1st | —N/a |
| Slovakia | IV Tier | 2024–25 4. Liga | Central: | | | |
| Slovakia | IV Tier | 2024–25 4. Liga | East: Spartak Medzev | MFK Kežmarok | 1st | —N/a |
| Slovakia | IV Tier | 2024–25 4. Liga | West: | | | |
| Slovenia | II Tier | 2024–25 Slovenian PrvaLiga | | | | |
| Spain | II Tier | 2024–25 Segunda División | Levante | Elche | 3rd | 2016–17 |
| Spain | III Tier | 2024–25 Primera Federación | North Group: Cultural Leonesa | Ponferradina | 3rd | 2016–17 |
| Spain | III Tier | 2024–25 Primera Federación | South Group: Ceuta FC | Real Murcia | 1st | —N/a |
| Spain | IV Tier | 2024–25 Segunda Federación | Group 1: Pontevedra CF | CD Numancia | 2nd | 2021–22 |
| Spain | IV Tier | 2024–25 Segunda Federación | Group 2: Arenas Club | SD Logroñés | 1st | —N/a |
| Spain | IV Tier | 2024–25 Segunda Federación | Group 3: CE Europa | Atlético Baleares | 1st | —N/a |
| Spain | IV Tier | 2024–25 Segunda Federación | Group 4: Juventud Torremolinos | La Unión Atlético | 1st | —N/a |
| Spain | IV Tier | 2024–25 Segunda Federación | Group 5: CD Guadalajara | CP Cacereño | 1st | —N/a |
| Spain | V Tier | 2024–25 Tercera Federación | Group 1 – Galicia: UD Ourense | CD Estradense | 1st | —N/a |
| Spain | V Tier | 2024–25 Tercera Federación | Group 2 – Asturias: Real Oviedo Vetusta | Caudal Deportivo | 2nd | 2021–22 |
| Spain | V Tier | 2024–25 Tercera Federación | Group 3 – Cantabria: UD Sámano | CD Tropezón | 1st | —N/a |
| Spain | V Tier | 2024–25 Tercera Federación | Group 4 – Basque Country: CD Basconia | Portugalete | 1st | —N/a |
| Spain | V Tier | 2024–25 Tercera Federación | Group 5 – Catalonia: Reus FCR | Atlètic Lleida | 1st | —N/a |
| Spain | V Tier | 2024–25 Tercera Federación | Group 6 – Valencian Community: CD Castellón B | CD Roda | 1st | —N/a |
| Spain | V Tier | 2024–25 Tercera Federación | Group 7 – Community of Madrid: RSD Alcalá | Rayo Vallecano B | 1st | —N/a |
| Spain | V Tier | 2024–25 Tercera Federación | Group 8 – Castile and León: Atlético Astorga FC | Atlético Tordesillas | 1st | —N/a |
| Spain | V Tier | 2024–25 Tercera Federación | Group 9 – Eastern Andalusia and Melilla: Atlético Malagueño | Real Jaén | 1st | —N/a |
| Spain | V Tier | 2024–25 Tercera Federación | Group 10 – Western Andalusia and Ceuta: Puente Genil FC | Ciudad de Lucena | 1st | —N/a |
| Spain | V Tier | 2024–25 Tercera Federación | Group 11 – Balearic Islands: UD Poblense | CE Constància | 1st | —N/a |
| Spain | V Tier | 2024–25 Tercera Federación | Group 12 – Canary Islands: UD Las Palmas Atlético | UD San Fernando | 1st | —N/a |
| Spain | V Tier | 2024–25 Tercera Federación | Group 13 – Region of Murcia: CF Lorca Deportiva | CD Cieza | 1st | —N/a |
| Spain | V Tier | 2024–25 Tercera Federación | Group 14 – Extremadura: CD Extremadura | CD Azuaga | 1st | —N/a |
| Spain | V Tier | 2024–25 Tercera Federación | Group 15 – Navarre: UD Mutilvera | Valle de Egüés | 1st | —N/a |
| Spain | V Tier | 2024–25 Tercera Federación | Group 16 – La Rioja: Náxara CD | UD Logroñés B | 2nd | 2022–23 |
| Spain | V Tier | 2024–25 Tercera Federación | Group 17 – Aragon: CD Ebro | SD Huesca B | 1st | —N/a |
| Spain | V Tier | 2024–25 Tercera Federación | Group 18 – Castilla–La Mancha: CD Quintanar del Rey | Atlético Albacete | 1st | —N/a |
| Turkey | II Tier | 2024–25 TFF First League | Kocaelispor | Gençlerbirliği | 4th | 2007–08 |
| Turkey | III Tier | 2024–25 TFF Second League | Red Group: Serik Belediyespor | Batman Petrolspor | 1st | —N/a |
| Turkey | III Tier | 2024–25 TFF Second League | White Group: Sarıyer S.K. | Elazığspor | 1st | —N/a |
| Turkey | IV Tier | 2024–25 TFF Third League | Group 1: Bursaspor | Karşıyaka S.K. | 1st | —N/a |
| Turkey | IV Tier | 2024–25 TFF Third League | Group 2: Muğlaspor | Balıkesirspor | 3rd | 2001–02 |
| Turkey | IV Tier | 2024–25 TFF Third League | Group 3: Aliağa FK | Ayvalıkgücü Belediyespor | 1st | —N/a |
| Turkey | IV Tier | 2024–25 TFF Third League | Group 4: Mardin 1969 SK | Sebat Gençlikspor | 3rd | 2000–01 |
| Ukraine | II Tier | 2024–25 Ukrainian First League | Epitsentr Kamianets-Podilskyi | Poltava | 1st | —N/a |
| Ukraine | III Tier | 2024–25 Ukrainian Second League | Probiy Horodenka | Kolos-2 Kovalivka | 1st | —N/a |
| Ukraine | IV Tier | 2024–25 Ukrainian Football Amateur League | | | | |
| Wales | II Tier | 2024–25 Cymru North | Colwyn Bay | Airbus UK Broughton | 2nd | 2022–23 |
| Wales | II Tier | 2024–25 Cymru South | Llanelli Town | Trethomas Bluebirds | 1st | —N/a |
| Wales | III Tier | 2024–25 Ardal NE | Brickfield Rangers | Bow Street | 1st | —N/a |
| Wales | III Tier | 2024–25 Ardal NW | Rhyl 1879 | Holyhead Hotspur | 1st | —N/a |
| Wales | III Tier | 2024–25 Ardal SE | Treowen Stars | Chepstow Town | 1st | —N/a |
| Wales | III Tier | 2024–25 Ardal SW | Cardiff Draconians | Ynyshir Albions | 1st | —N/a |

== Tier II to V domestic cups ==
=== AFC ===
| Nation | Cup | Champion | Final score | Second place | Title | Last honour |
|---|---|---|---|---|---|---|
| Australia | 2025 NPL Night Series | Sorrento | 1–0 | Stirling Macedonia | 1st | —N/a |
| Australia | 2025 NPL Night Series | Kingsley Westside | 0–0 (6–5 p) | Mandurah City | 1st | —N/a |
| Australia | 2025 Capital Football Men's Charity Shield | O'Connor Knights | 2–1 | Gungahlin United | 1st | —N/a |
| Australia | 2025 Dockerty Cup | South Melbourne | 2–1 | Heidelberg United | 10th | 2024 |
| Singapore | 2025 SFL Challenge Cup | Singapore Cricket Club | 1-0 | Singapore Khalsa Association | 1st | —N/a |
| Singapore | 2025 Singapore FA Cup | Warwick Knights | 2-1 | Police SA | 1st | —N/a |

=== CONCACAF ===
| Nation | Cup | Champion | Final score | Second place | Title | Last honour |
|---|---|---|---|---|---|---|
| Mexico | 2025 Copa Conecta | Santiago | 3–0 | Real Zamora | 1st | —N/a |

=== CONMEBOL ===
| Nation | Cup | Champion | Final score | Second place | Title | Last honour |
|---|---|---|---|---|---|---|
| (Brazil) Brasil | 2025 Copa Alagoas | | | | | |
| (Brazil) Brasil | 2025 Copa do Nordeste | | | | | |
| (Brazil) Brasil | 2025 Copa Verde | Paysandu | 1–1 (5–4 p) | Goiás | 5th | 2024 |
| (Brazil) Brasil | 2025 Super Copa Grão-Pará | Paysandu | 2–0 | Tuna Luso | 1st | —N/a |

=== UEFA ===
| Nation | Cup | Champion | Final score | Second place | Title | Last honour |
|---|---|---|---|---|---|---|
| Austria | 2024–25 BFV Cup | | | | | |
| Austria | 2024–25 KFV Cup | | | | | |
| Austria | 2024–25 SFV Cup | | | | | |
| Austria | 2024–25 WFV Cup | | | | | |
| Austria | 2024–25 OOEFV Cup | | | | | |
| Austria | 2024–25 TFV Cup | | | | | |
| Austria | 2024–25 STFV Cup | | | | | |
| Austria | 2024–25 VFV Cup | | | | | |
| England | 2024–25 FA Trophy | Aldershot Town | 3–0 | Spennymoor Town | 1st | —N/a |
| England | 2024–25 National League Cup | Leeds United U21 | 2–1 | Sutton United | 1st | —N/a |
| Finland | 2025 Ykköscup | Jippo | 0–0 (5–3 p) | TPS Turku | 1st | —N/a |
| Greece | 2024–25 EPS Dramas Cup | Doxa Drama | 1–0 | MAS Megas Alexandros Agiou Athanasiou | 1st | —N/a |
| (Republic of Ireland) Ireland | 2024–25 Munster Senior Cup | Cobh Ramblers | 2–0 | Rockmount | 7th | 2022–23 |
| Iceland | 2025 Icelandic Men's Football League Cup B | Höttur/Huginn | 2–2 (4–3 p) | KF Vídir | 1st | —N/a |
| Italy | Coppa Italia Serie C 2024-2025 | Rimini FC | 1–0 | Giana Erminio | 1st | —N/a |
| Italy | Coppa Italia Serie D 2024-2025 | Ravenna | 2–2 (5–4 p) | Guidonia M. 1937 | 1st | —N/a |
| Malta | 2024–25 Maltese Challenge Cup | Pietà Hotspurs | 1–0 | Valletta | 1st | —N/a |
| Moldova | 2025 Moldovan Winter Cup | Dacia Buiucani | —N/a | Univer Comrat | 1st | —N/a |
| Moldova | 2025 Făleşti District Cup | Primăria Făleşti | 3–1 | Primăria Albinețul Vechi | 2nd | 2023 |
| Moldova | 2025 Ialoveni District Super Cup | FC Bardar | 1–0 | Viișoara Mileștii Mici | 3rd | 2024 |
| Moldova | 2025 Ungheni District Super Cup | Haiduc Bumbăta | 4–2 | FC Sculeni | 1st | —N/a |
| Norway | 2025 OBOS Supercup | Lokomotiv Oslo | 3–2 (a.e.t.) | Bærum | 1st | —N/a |
| Scotland | 2024–25 Scottish Challenge Cup | Livingston | 5–0 | Queen's Park | 2nd | 2014–15 |
| Scotland | 2024–25 Highland League Cup | Brora Rangers | 3–1 | Fraserburgh | 4th | 2023–24 |
| Scotland | 2024–25 Lowland League Cup | East Kilbride | 3–1 | Bo'ness United | 5th | 2022–23 |
| Scotland | 2024–25 North of Scotland Cup | Brora Rangers | 6–1 | Clachnacuddin | 9th | 2022–23 |
| Scotland | 2024–25 Aberdeenshire Shield | Fraserburgh | 4–2 | Formartine United | 10th | 2022–23 |
| Ukraine | 2024–25 Ukrainian Amateur Cup | Ahrotekh Tyshkivka | 1–0 | Mayak Sarny | 1st | —N/a |

== Men's university leagues ==
=== AFC ===
| Nation | League | Champion | Second place | Title | Last honour |
|---|---|---|---|---|---|
| Philippines | 2024–25 UAAP Men's Football Championship (Season 87) | FEU Tamaraws | Ateneo Blue Eagles | 6th | 2022–23 |

=== CONCACAF ===
| Nation | League | Champion | Second place | Title | Last honour |
|---|---|---|---|---|---|
| Canada | 2025 U Sports Men's Soccer Championship | York Lions | Mount Royal Cougars | 4th | 2015 |
| United States | 2025 NCAA Division I men's soccer tournament | Washington Huskies | NC State Wolfpack | 1st | —N/a |
| United States | 2025 NCAA Division II men's soccer tournament | Midwestern State Mustangs | Rollins Tars | 1st | —N/a |
| United States | 2025 NCAA Division III men's soccer tournament | Tufts Jumbos | Trinity Tigers | 5th | 2019 |
| United States | 2025 NAIA Men's Soccer Championship | Grand View Vikings | WVU Tech Golden Bears | 1st | —N/a |

== Women's university leagues ==
=== AFC ===
| Nation | League | Champion | Second place | Title | Last honour |
|---|---|---|---|---|---|
| Philippines | 2024–25 UAAP Women's Football Championship (Season 87) | FEU Lady Tamaraws | De La Salle Lady Booters | 13th | 2023–24 |

=== CAF ===
| Nation | League | Champion | Second place | Title | Last honour |
|---|---|---|---|---|---|
| South Africa | 2025 Women's Varsity Football | University of the Western Cape | University of Johannesburg | 4th | 2024 |

=== CONCACAF ===
| Nation | League | Champion | Second place | Title | Last honour |
|---|---|---|---|---|---|
| Canada | 2025 U Sports Women's Soccer Championship | Montreal Carabins | UBC Thunderbirds | 3rd | 2022 |
| United States | 2025 NCAA Division I women's soccer tournament | Florida State Seminoles | Stanford Cardinal | 5th | 2023 |
| United States | 2025 NCAA Division II women's soccer tournament | Florida Tech Panthers | Franklin Pierce Ravens | 1st | —N/a |
| United States | 2025 NCAA Division III women's soccer tournament | Washington University Bears | Emory Eagles | 3rd | 2024 |
| United States | 2025 NAIA Women's Soccer Championship | Keiser Seahawks | Cumberlands Patriots | 3rd | 2020 (Note: The "2020" NAIA championship was held in spring 2021 due to COVID-19 issues.) |

== Men's youth divisions leagues ==
=== AFC ===
| Nation | Cup | Champion | Second place | Title | Last honour |
|---|---|---|---|---|---|
| Australia | 2025 V-League U23 | | | | |

=== CONMEBOL ===
| Nation | Cup | Champion | Second place | Title | Last honour |
|---|---|---|---|---|---|
| (Brazil) Brasil | 2025 Campeonato Brasileiro U20 | | | | |
| (Brazil) Brasil | 2025 Campeonato Goiano U20 | | | | |
| Peru | 2025 Liga Sub-18 | | | | |

=== UEFA ===
| Nation | Cup | Champion | Second place | Title | Last honour |
|---|---|---|---|---|---|
| Austria | 2024–25 Jugendliga U18 | | | | |
| Austria | 2024–25 Jugendliga U16 | | | | |
| Austria | 2024–25 Jugendliga U15 | | | | |
| Azerbaijan | 2024–25 Azerbaijan Reserve League | | | | |
| Belarus | 2025 Belarusian Premier League Reserves Championship | | | | |
| Hungary | 2024–25 Hungarian U19 League | Puskás Akadémia | Kisvárda | 6th | 2023–24 |
| Italy | 2024–25 Campionato Primavera 1 | Inter Milan | ACF Fiorentina | 11th | 2021–22 |
| Italy | 2024–25 Campionato Primavera 2 | Frosinone Calcio | Napoli | 1st | —N/a |
| Moldova | 2024–25 Moldovan Youth League | Academia Rebeja | Dacia Buiucani Youth | 2nd | 2023–24 |
| Moldova | 2024–25 U17 National League | Dacia Buiucani Youth | Academia Rebeja | 1st | —N/a |
| Moldova | 2024–25 U16 National League | Academia Rebeja | Zimbru Chișinău U16 | 2nd | 2023–24 |
| Moldova | 2024–25 U16 Play off | CS Atletic Strășeni | ACS Juniorul Chișinău | 1st | —N/a |
| Moldova | 2024–25 U15 National League | Academia Rebeja | | 2nd | 2022–23 |
| Moldova | 2024–25 U14 National League | Academia Rebeja | | 1st | —N/a |
| Moldova | 2024–25 U13 National League | Academia Rebeja | FC Bălți | 2nd | 2023–24 |
| Moldova | 2024–25 U12 National League | Academia Rebeja | | 2nd | 2023–24 |
| Moldova | 2024–25 U11 National League | Academia Rebeja | Zimbru Chișinău U11 | 2nd | 2023–24 |
| Scotland | 2024–25 SPFL Reserve League | | | | |
| Ukraine | 2024–25 Ukrainian Premier League Under-19 | Dynamo Kyiv | Shakhtar Donetsk | 8th | 2023–24 |

== Women's youth divisions leagues ==
=== UEFA ===
| Nation | Cup | Champion | Second place | Title | Last honour |
|---|---|---|---|---|---|
| Moldova | 2024–25 Women U16 National League | RSDUȘOR Nistru-Cioburciu | | 2nd | 2023–24 |
| Moldova | 2024–25 Women U14 National League | Zimbru-Drăsliceni | Real Succes ȘS11 Pudra Chișinău | 1st | —N/a |
| Moldova | 2024–25 Women U12 National League Spring | PGU-ȘS-4 Legia-Alga | ȘS Taraclia | 1st | —N/a |

== Men's youth divisions cups ==
=== CONMEBOL ===
| Nation | Cup | Champion | Final score | Second place | Title | Last honour |
|---|---|---|---|---|---|---|
| (Brazil) Brasil | 2025 Copa do Brasil U17 | | | | | |
| (Brazil) Brasil | 2025 Copa Rio U20 | | | | | |
| (Brazil) Brasil | 2025 Copa São Paulo de Futebol Júnior | São Paulo | 3–2 | Corinthians | 5th | 2019 |

=== UEFA ===
| Nation | Cup | Champion | Final score | Second place | Title | Last honour |
|---|---|---|---|---|---|---|
| Germany | 2024-2025 Junioren DFB Pokal | Werder Bremen U19 | 2–0 | Karlsruher SC U19 | 1st | —N/a |
| Greece | 2024-2025 Greece U19 Cup | PAOK | 1–0 (a.e.t.) | Olympiacos | 1st | —N/a |
| Italy | Coppa Italia Primavera 2024-2025 | Cagliari Primavera | 3–0 | AC Milan Youth Sector | 1st | —N/a |
| Italy | 2025 Supercoppa Primavera 2 | Frosinone Primavera | 2–2 (4–1 p) | Parma Youth | 1st | —N/a |
| Portugal | 2025 Taça Revelação U23 | SL Benfica U23 | 6–2 | Torreense U23 | 1st | —N/a |
| Spain | 2025 Copa del Rey Juvenil | FC Barcelona Juvenil | 5–0 | Real Zaragoza Juvenil | 19th | 2011 |

== Women's youth divisions cups ==
=== UEFA ===
| Nation | Cup | Champion | Final score | Second place | Title | Last honour |
|---|---|---|---|---|---|---|
| Moldova | 2024–25 Women's U14 Moldovan Cup | FC Zimbru-Drăsliceni | 7–0 | ȘS Telenești | 1st | —N/a |

== Men's Futsal National leagues ==
=== OFC ===
| Nation | League | Champion | Second place | Title | Last honour |
|---|---|---|---|---|---|
| New Zealand | 2025 New Zealand Futsal SuperLeague | Palmerston North Marist Futsal | WaiBOP Futsal | 1st | — |

=== UEFA ===
| Nation | League | Champion | Second place | Title | Last honour |
|---|---|---|---|---|---|
| Albania | 2024–25 Albanian Futsal Championship | | | | |
| Andorra | 2024–25 Primera Divisió | FC Encamp | FC Rànger's | 18th | 2022–23 |
| Armenia | 2024–25 Armenian Futsal Superleague | | | | |
| Austria | 2024–25 Austrian Futsal Liga | FC Ljuti Krajišnici | FC Diamant Linz | 1st | —N/a |
| Azerbaijan | 2024–25 Armenian Premier Futsal League | | | | |
| Belarus | 2024–25 Belarusian Futsal Premier League | | | | |
| Belgium | 2024–25 Belgian Futsal Division 1 | | | | |
| Bosnia and Herzegovina | 2024–25 Premier Futsal League of Bosnia and Herzegovina | | | | |
| Bulgaria | 2024–25 Bulgarian Premiere Futsal League | | | | |
| Croatia | 2024–25 Croatian First Futsal League | | | | |
| Cyprus | 2024–25 Cypriot Futsal First Division | | | | |
| Czech Republic | 2024–25 Czech Futsal First League | | | | |
| Denmark | 2024–25 Danish Futsal Championship | | | | |
| England | 2024–25 National Futsal Series | | | | |
| Estonia | 2024–25 Saalijalgpalli Meistriliiga | | | | |
| Finland | 2024–25 Futsal-Liiga | | | | |
| France | 2024–25 Championnat de France de Futsal | | | | |
| (Georgia (country)) Georgia | 2024–25 Georgian Futsal League | | | | |
| Germany | 2024–25 Futsal Bundesliga | | | | |
| Gibraltar | 2024–25 Gibraltar Futsal First Division | | | | |
| Greece | 2024–25 Hellenic Futsal Super League | | | | |
| Hungary | 2024–25 NB I | | | | |
| Iceland | 2024–25 Icelandic Futsal First Division | Ísbjörninn | Afturelding/Hvíti/Alaf | 4th | 2023–24 |
| Republic of Ireland | 2024–25 AUL Futsal Premier League | | | | |
| Italy | 2024–25 Serie A1 | | | | |
| Kazakhstan | 2024–25 Kazakhstani Futsal Championship | | | | |
| Kosovo | 2024–25 Futsal Superleague of Kosovo | | | | |
| Latvia | 2024–25 Latvian Futsal Premier League | | | | |
| Lithuania | 2024–25 A Lyga | FK Kauno Žalgiris | Jonavos Vikingai | 9th | 2023–24 |
| Luxembourg | 2024–25 Futsal Division 1 | FC Differdange 03 | FC Progrès Niederkorn | 6th | 2023–24 |
| Malta | 2024–25 Maltese Futsal League | Luxol | Swieqi United | 9th | 2023–24 |
| Moldova | 2024–25 Moldovan Profesional Futsal League | FC Clic Media | | 2nd | 2023–24 |
| Montenegro | 2024–25 Montenegrin Futsal First League | | | | |
| Netherlands | 2024–25 Topdivisie | | | | |
| Northern Ireland | 2024–25 Male Domestic League | | | | |
| North Macedonia | 2024–25 First Futsal League | | | | |
| Norway | 2024–25 NFF Futsal Eliteserie | Sjarmtrollan | Utleira | 3rd | 2018–19 |
| Poland | 2024–25 Ekstraklasa | Piast Gliwice | Constract Lubawa | 2nd | 2021–22 |
| Portugal | 2024–25 Campeonato Nacional da I Divisão de Futsal | | | | |
| Romania | 2024–25 Liga I | | | | |
| Russia | 2024–25 Russian Futsal Super League | | | | |
| San Marino | 2024–25 Campionato Sammarinese di Futsal | | | | |
| Scotland | 2024–25 Scottish Futsal League | | | | |
| Serbia | 2024–25 Serbian Prva Futsal Liga | | | | |
| Slovakia | 2024–25 Slovak Futsal Extraliga | | | | |
| Slovenia | 2024–25 Slovenian Futsal League | | | | |
| Spain | 2024–25 Primera División de Futsal | | | | |
| Sweden | 2024–25 Swedish Futsal League | | | | |
| Switzerland | 2024–25 Swiss Futsal Premier League | | | | |
| Turkey | 2024–25 Turkish Futsal League | | | | |
| Ukraine | 2024–25 Extra-Liga | | | | |
| Wales | 2024–25 FAW Elite Futsal League | | | | |

== Deaths ==
=== January ===
- 2 January
  - Aldo Agroppi, Italian football player and manager
  - Werner Leimgruber, Swiss footballer
  - Cristóbal Ortega, Mexican footballer
- 3 January — Gilbert Van Binst, Belgian football player and manager
- 4 January
  - Mohsen Habacha, Tunisian footballer
  - Yılmaz Urul, Turkish footballer
- 5 January — Juan Manuel Villa, Spanish footballer
- 6 January — Dušan Maravić, Serbian footballer
- 8 January
  - Jorge Cáceres, Argentine-Colombian footballer
  - Fabio Cudicini, Italian footballer
- 10 January — Nelson Silva Pacheco, Colombian footballer
- 11 January
  - Bobby Kennedy, Scottish football player and manager
  - Martinus Johannes Maria "Tiny" Ruys, Dutch football player and manager
- 13 January
  - Tony Book, English football player and manager
  - Vicente Vega, Venezuelan footballer
- 16 January — Harry Bild, Swedish footballer
- 17 January — Denis Law, Scottish footballer
- 18 January
  - Garry Brooke, English footballer
  - Nicolae Oaidă, Romanian football player and manager
- 19 January — Jimmy Calderwood, Scottish football player and manager
- 20 January — Mimi El-Sherbini, Egyptian football player and manager
- 23 January — Andreas Stamatiadis, Greek football player and manager
- 24 January — David Gaskell, English footballer

=== April ===
- 25 April — Wayne Addicoat, Scottish footballer

=== July ===
- 1 July — Rinus Israël, Dutch footballer and manager
- 2 July — Juan Álvarez, Mexican footballer and manager
- 3 July
  - Diogo Jota, Portuguese footballer
  - André Silva, Portuguese footballer
- 7 July — Juan Cutillas, Spanish footballer and coach
- 17 July — Ronald 'Wyn' Davies, Welsh footballer

=== August ===
- 5 August – Ove Kindvall, Swedish footballer
- 5 August – Frank Mill, German footballer
- 6 August – Suleiman Obeid, Palestinian footballer
- 10 August – Kunishige Kamamoto, Japanese footballer
- 11 August
  - Benő Káposzta, Hungarian footballer
  - Mustapha Tahiri, Moroccan footballer
- 16 August
  - Fernando Cruz, Portuguese footballer
  - Dan Tana, Serbian footballer
  - Richard Tylinski, French football player and manager
- 17 August – Hans-Bert Matoul, German footballer
- 18 August
  - Issaâd Dhomar, Algerian footballer
  - Tendai Ndoro, Zimbabwean footballer
- 19 August
  - Martin Laamers, Dutch footballer
  - Razak Omotoyossi, Nigerian-Beninese footballer
- 23 August – Gerry Harrison, English football commentator
- 24 August – Theo Vonk, Dutch football player and manager
- 27 August – Abdellah Liegeon, Algerian footballer
- 30 August – Bud Brocken, Dutch footballer

=== September ===
- 1 September – Jimmy Bone, Scottish footballer
- 2 September – Moustapha Sall, Mauritanian football player and manager
- 4 September – Ryszard Budka, Polish footballer
- 7 September – Dunshee de Abranches, Brazilian football president

=== October ===
- 8 October — Miguel Ángel Russo, Argentine footballer and manager
- W/c 20 October — Mick McNeil, English footballer
