= 2025–26 Adran Trophy =

Welsh women's football tournament season

Tournament details
- Country: Wales
- Dates: 7 September 2025 – 22 February 2026
- Teams: 24

Final positions
- Champions: Wrexham (1st title)
- Runners-up: Cardiff City

Tournament statistics
- Matches played: 39
- Goals scored in penalty shoot-outs not included.

The 2025–26 season of the Adran Trophy, also known as Genero Adran Trophy, is the 12th iteration of the Welsh women's league cup open to the teams competing in the Adran Leagues, the top two tiers of the Welsh women's league structure. The New Saints were the defending champions.

Wrexham won the trophy, defeating rivals Cardiff City in the finals on penalties after a 2–2 match at Bangor City stadium.

== Qualifying ==
=== Group 1 ===
Pos	Team	Pld	W	D	L	GF	GA	GD	Pts	
1	Cwmbran Celtic FC Women	3	2	1	0	7	4	+3	7	Advances to round of 16
2	Cascade YC Women FC	3	2	0	1	6	3	+3	6	Advances to round of 16
3	Penybont Women FC	3	1	0	2	4	4	0	3	
4	Taffs Well FC Women	3	0	1	2	2	8	−6	1	

Updated to match(es) played on 28 October 2025. Source: https://faw.cymru/adran-leagues/adran-trophy/table/

=== Group 2 ===
Pos	Team	Pld	W	D	L	GF	GA	GD	Pts	
1	Cardiff Met WFC	3	3	0	0	7	1	+6	9	Advances to round of 16
2	Llanelli Town Afc Women	3	1	1	1	4	5	−1	4	Advances to round of 16
3	Pure Swansea Women FC	3	1	1	1	3	4	−1	4	
4	Carmarthen Town FC Women	3	0	0	3	2	6	−4	0	

Updated to match(es) played on 28 October 2025. Source: https://faw.cymru/adran-leagues/adran-trophy/table/

=== Group 3 ===
Pos	Team	Pld	W	D	L	GF	GA	GD	Pts	
1	Llandudno Ladies FC	3	3	0	0	6	2	+4	9	Advances to round of 16
2	CPDM Y Felinheli	3	1	1	1	6	6	0	4	Advances to round of 16
3	Connah's Quay Nomads Women FC	3	1	0	2	3	4	−1	3	
4	Berriew Ladies FC	3	0	1	2	3	6	−3	1	

Updated to match(es) played on 28 October 2025. Source: https://faw.cymru/adran-leagues/adran-trophy/table/

=== Group 4 ===
Pos	Team	Pld	W	D	L	GF	GA	GD	Pts	
1	Llanfair United Ladies FC	3	2	0	1	8	4	+4	6	Advances to round of 16
2	Flint Town United Ladies FC	3	2	0	1	6	7	−1	6	Advances to round of 16
3	Llangefni Town Ladies FC	3	1	0	2	5	4	+1	3	
4	CPDM Bangor Women FC	3	1	0	2	2	6	−4	3	

Updated to match(es) played on 28 October 2025. Source: https://faw.cymru/adran-leagues/adran-trophy/table/

== Round of 16 ==
The eight teams competing in the Adran Premier (seeded) were drawn against the eight teams advancing from the group stage (unseeded).

9 November 2025 Round of 16	Aberystwyth Town	7–0	Y Felinheli	Aberystwyth
14:00 BST	Kersey 12' (pen.); Jenkins 14' 45'; Scourfield 33'; Baker 71' 73'; Isaac 82'	Report		Stadium: Park Avenue, Aberystwyth; Referee: Aled Rhys Jones

9 November 2025 Round of 16	Swansea City	4–0	Cardiff Met	Neath
14:00 BST	Deacon 13' 43'; John 35'; Richards 81'	Report		Stadium: Llandarcy Academy Of Sport; Referee: Charlotte Elizabeth Carpenter

9 November 2025 Round of 16	Llanfair United	4–5	The New Saints	Llanfair
14:00 BST	Wylde 18' 41' 85'; Cook 71'	Report	Francis-Jones 10'; Jones 14'; Crees 28' 56'; Harrison 74'	Stadium: Mount Field; Referee: Lilah Thomas

9 November 2025 Round of 16	Llanelli Town Afc	0–1	Pontypridd United	Llanelli
14:00 BST		Report	Lloyd 83'	Stadium: Llanelli Stebonheath Park; Referee: Sion Owen Jenkins

9 November 2025 Round of 16	Cardiff City	7–0	Flint Town United	Cardiff
14:00 BST	Barry 14' 39'; Perrott 32' 90'; Malin 34'; Evans 44'; Ashun 70'	Report		Stadium: Cardiff International Sports Stadium; Referee: Gemma Amanda May Border

9 November 2025 Round of 16	Barry Town Utd	3–0	Cascade YC	Barry
14:00 BST	Shanahan 41'; Harris 44'; Thomas 49'	Report		Stadium: Jenner Park Stadium; Referee: Joseph Gibson

9 November 2025 Round of 16	Briton Ferry Llansawel	3–2	Cwmbran Celtic	Briton Ferry
14:00 BST	Kearle 12' 31'; Payne 90'	Report	Shipley 30'; Pinchard 52'	Stadium: The Renewable Centre Stadium; Referee: Dale Randall

9 November 2025 Round of 16	Wrexham	9–0	Llandudno	Buckley
17:30 BST	Mahmood 3' 50' 66'; Jones 10'; Hillier-Knox 29'; Barker 52' 81'; Hughes 73' 85'	Report		Stadium: Buckley Town FC; Referee: Rubie Bennett

== Quarter-finals ==
The quarter-finals draw was performed on November 12, 2025.

14 December 2025 Quarter-final	Briton Ferry Llansawel	2–0	Barry Town Utd	Briton Ferry
14:00 BST	Crofts 8'; Owen 49'	Report		Stadium: The Renewable Centre Stadium; Referee: Gemma Amanda May Border

14 December 2025 Quarter-final	Wrexham	2–2 (5–4 p)	Aberystwyth Town’s	Wrexham
14:00 BST	Hughes 47'; Bartle 80'	Report	Moralee-Hughes 72'; Gardner 90'	Stadium: The Rock, Rhosymedre; Referee: Mark James
	Penalties
	Iddenden (penalty scored); Barker (penalty scored); Smith (penalty scored); L. Jones (penalty scored); Hillier-Knox (penalty scored)		(penalty scored) Isaac; (penalty scored) Chambers; (penalty scored) Jenkins; (penalty scored) Mathias; (penalty missed) Scourfield

14 December 2025 Quarter-final	The New Saints	5–1	Pontypridd United	Oswestry
14:00 BST	Phelps 25' (o.g.) 30' (o.g.); Webb 45'; Harrison 71'; Francis-Jones 72'	Report	Lloyd 1'	Stadium: Park Hall, Oswestry; Referee: Richard Lee Wright

14 December 2025 Quarter-final	Swansea City	0–6	Cardiff City	Neath
14:00 BST		Report	Power 5'; Walklett 11'; Olden 44'; Barry 62' 74'	Stadium: Llandarcy Academy Of Sport; Referee: Teifion Cook

== Semi-finals ==
The semi-finals draw was performed on December 16, 2025. The matches were meant to be played on January 11, but both were postponed due to pitch conditions.

18 January 2026 Semi-final	Wrexham	6–0	Briton Ferry Llansawel	Wrexham
14:00 BST	Hillier-Knox 23' 54' 65'; Bartle 56'; Hughes 69' 82'	Report		Stadium: The Rock, Rhosymedre; Referee: Ross Mantle

18 January 2026 Semi-final	The New Saints	0–3	Cardiff City	Oswestry
14:00 BST		Report	Lloyd 14' 67'; Olden 27'	Stadium: Park Hall; Referee: Aled Williams

== Final ==
The final was hosted in Bangor on February 22.

22 February 2026 Final	Wrexham	2–2 (4-2 p)	Cardiff City	Bangor
17:00 BST	Suckley 25'; Francis-Jones 80'	Report	Evans 6'; Cook 45'	Stadium: Bangor City Stadium; Referee: Gemma Amanda May Border
	Penalties
	Barker (penalty missed); Mahmood (penalty scored); Smith (penalty scored); Francis-Jones (penalty scored); Knox (penalty scored)		(penalty missed) Price; (penalty missed) Olden; (penalty scored) Power; (penalty scored) Barry
