= 2011–12 Welsh Women's Cup =

2011–12 FAW Women's Cup
The Welsh Women's Cup

Tournament details
- Country: Wales
- Teams: 31

Final positions
- Champions: Cardiff City Ladies F.C.
- Runners-up: UWIC Ladies

The 2011–12 FAW Women's Cup saw a record number of entrants. 31 teams is six more than last season. Due to the uneven number of clubs, holders Swansea City were given a bye in the first round.

The Cup was won by Cardiff City Ladies F.C.

== First round ==
The draw for the first round is regionalised between North and South Wales .

North:

2 October 2011	Aberystwyth Town Ladies	1–2	Llanidloes Ladies	Park Avenue, Aberystwyth
14:00 GMT	Mel Davies		Jenny Broughall; Tricia Turner

2 October 2011	Caernarfon Town Ladies	7–1	Buckley Town Ladies	The Oval, Caernarfon
14:00 GMT

2 October 2011	Meifod Ladies	0–3	Llandudno Junction Ladies
14:00 GMT

2 October 2011	Penrhyncoch Ladies	0–11	Northop Hall Girls
14:00 GMT

2 October 2011	Prestatyn Town Ladies	1–7	Wrexham Ladies	Bastion Road, Prestatyn
14:00 GMT	tbc	report	Lyndsey Rodger 23'; Liv Pridding-Hull 29'; Jade Gavan 36', 68'; Lowri Edwards 48'; Steph Taylor 64'; Lexi Musgrove 90'

2 October 2011	Tregaron Turfs Ladies	4–2	Kinmel Bay Ladies
14:00 GMT

South

2 October 2011	Bridgend Town Ladies	11–2	Garden Village Ladies
14:00 GMT

2 October 2011	Caerphilly Castle Ladies	w/o	Aberaman Athletic Ladies
14:00 GMT

2 October 2011	Camrose Ladies	0–6	Cascade Youth
14:00 GMT

2 October 2011	Cardiff City Ladies	1–3	Trefelin Ladies
14:00 GMT			Cath Walsh; Cath Walsh; Courtney Thomas

2 October 2011	Cardiff University Ladies	6–3	Newport County Ladies
14:00 GMT

2 October 2011	Newcastle Emlyn Ladies	0–10	Cardiff City Ladies
14:00 GMT

2 October 2011	PILCS Ladies	3–4	UWIC Ladies
14:00 GMT	Alice Evans; Amy Thrupp; Amy Thrupp	report

2 October 2011	Swansea University Ladies	0–21	Cyncoed Ladies
14:00 GMT

2 October 2011	Valleys United Ladies	9–1	Dafen Welfare Ladies
14:00 GMT

Swansea City Ladies were given a bye. Aberaman Athletic Ladies withdrew from competition, tie awarded to Caerphilly Castle Ladies.

== Second round ==
The draw for the second round took place on Tuesday, 4 October 2011. Matches were scheduled to be played on 30 October 2011, but two were postponed; Those were replayed on 2 and 6 November 2011 respectively.

North:

Caernarfon Town Ladies	16–1	Tregaron Turfs Ladies

Llanidloes Ladies	1–2	Wrexham Ladies

Northop Hall Girls	2–4	Llandudno Junction Ladies

South:

Cascade Youth	0–2	Caerphilly Castle Ladies

Cardiff University Ladies	2–4	UWIC Ladies

Trefelin Ladies	8–1	Bridgend Town Ladies

Valleys United Ladies	1–2	Swansea City Ladies

Cyncoed Ladies	0–5	Cardiff City Ladies

== Quarter-finals ==
The draw for the quarter-finals took place on 31 October 2011. Matches are to be played no later than 20 November 2011.

Llandudno Junction Ladies	0–1	Cardiff City Ladies
		Gwenanne Harries 5'

Trefelin Ladies	2–1	Caerphilly Castle Ladies

Wrexham Ladies	0–2 (a.e.t.)	Swansea City Ladies

UWIC Ladies	4–0	Caernarfon Town Ladies

== Semi-finals ==
The draw was held on 24 November 2011. Games were held at a neutral venue on 19 February 2012.

19 February 2012	UWIC Ladies	3–1	Trefelin Ladies	Port Talbot
12:00

19 February 2012	Cardiff City Ladies	3–1	Swansea City Ladies	Port Talbot
15:00

== Final ==
The final was held on 22 April 2012.

22 April 2012	UWIC Ladies	1–1 (2–4 p)	Cardiff City Ladies	Port Talbot
