= 2012–13 Welsh Women's Cup =

2012–13 FAW Women's Cup
The Welsh Women's Cup

Tournament details
- Country: Wales
- Teams: 28

Final positions
- Champions: Cardiff City Ladies
- Runners-up: Cardiff Met. Ladies

The 2012/13 FAW Women's Cup was the 21st season of Wales' national association football knock-out competition. It saw 28 clubs apply for entry, three less than previous season. In the same final as last year, Cardiff City Ladies defended their title by winning 3–1 over Cardiff Met. Ladies.

== Format ==
Play is a straight knock-out. The four semi finalists from the previous season were given a bye to the second round. They are holders Cardiff City Ladies, runners up Cardiff Met. Ladies (formerly UWIC), as well as semi-finalists Swansea City and Port Talbot Town (formerly Trefelin).

== First round ==
The draw for the first round is regionalised between North and South Wales . Bye to second round: Cardiff City Ladies, Cardiff Met. Ladies, Swansea City and Port Talbot Town.

North:

30 September 2012
14:00 GMT

Caernarfon Town	6–0	Kinmel Bay Ladies FC

30 September 2012
14:00 GMT

Denbigh Ladies	w/o	Rhyl Ladies
	Rhyl withdrew

30 September 2012
14:00 GMT

Llandudno Junction Ladies	3–8	Llanidloes Ladies

30 September 2012
14:00 GMT

Northop Hall Girls	0–2	Prestatyn Town Ladies

30 September 2012
14:00 GMT

Penrhyncoch Ladies	0–11	Aberystwyth Town Ladies

30 September 2012
14:00 GMT

Wrexham Ladies	11–0	Llanfair United Ladies

South

30 September 2012
14:00 GMT

Caerphilly Castle Ladies	w/o	Valleys United Ladies
	Valleys withdrew

30 September 2012
14:00 GMT

Cwmbran Celtic Ladies	2–0	Cardiff University Ladies

30 September 2012
14:00 GMT

P.I.L.C.S. Ladies	3–0^{[a]}	Cyncoed Ladies

30 September 2012
14:00 GMT

Dafen Welfare	0–17	Newcastle Emlyn Ladies

30 September 2012
14:00 GMT

Garden Village Juniors	1–7	Cardiff City

30 September 2012
14:00 GMT

Tregaron Ladies	3–4	Camrose Ladies

^{a} Game was originally drawn to be played at Cyncoed Ladies.

== Second round ==
Round was played on 21 and 28 October 2012. The match between Caernarfon Town and Llanidloes has been switched to a home tie at Llanidloes after it was postponed to 4 November due to bad weather.

21 October 2012

Port Talbot Town	2–3	Cwmbran Celtic Ladies

28 October 2012

Aberystwyth Town Ladies	4–3	Denbigh Ladies

28 October 2012

Prestatyn Town Ladies	0–6	Wrexham Ladies

28 October 2012

Cardiff City Ladies (English Premier)	6–0	Cardiff City (Wales)

28 October 2012

Cardiff Met. Ladies	5–0	Newcastle Emlyn Ladies

28 October 2012

Swansea City	5–0	Camrose Ladies

28 October 2012

Caerphilly Castle Ladies	2–10	P.I.L.C.S. Ladies

4 November 2012

Llanidloes Ladies	2–1 a.e.t.	Caernarfon Town

== Quarter finals ==
Round to be played Sunday 18 November 2012

18 November 2012
14.00

Cardiff City Ladies	7–0	Cwmbran Celtic Ladies

18 November 2012
14.00

Llanidloes Town	0–1	Wrexham

18 November 2012
14.00

PILCS Ladies	7–0	Aberystwyth Town

18 November 2012
14.00

Swansea City Ladies	1–3	Cardiff Met. Ladies

== Semi finals ==
Round to be played on 17 February 2013.

17 February 2013
14:00

PILCS Ladies	0–6	Cardiff City Ladies

Newport Stadium
17 February 2013
14:00

Wrexham	1–2	Cardiff Met. Ladies

Llanidloes Town FC stadium

== Final ==
Both teams played last year's final, which Cardiff City won in a penalty shoot-out.

City again won the title.

7 May 2013

Cardiff City Ladies	3–1	Cardiff Met. Ladies
Kelly Aldridge 2'; Nia Jones 52'; Paige Stewart 60' (pen.)	Report	Emily Brown 17'

Parc y Scarlets, Llanelli
Attendance: 348
