= 2021–22 Adran Premier =

Welsh women's 1st tier association football season

Adran Premier
- Season: 2021–22
- Dates: 5 September 2021 – 17 April 2022
- Champions: Swansea City
- Relegated: Port Talbot Town
- Top goalscorer: Stacey John-Davis (14 goals)

The 2021–22 Adran Premier season (also known as genero Adran Premier for sponsorship reasons), was the first edition of the Adran Premier, the highest level of league competition for women's football in Wales, and the thirteenth season of top-flight women's football in Wales overall. It is the women's equivalent of the men's Cymru Premier, and it is organized by the Football Association of Wales. The competition began on 5 September 2021 and ended on 17 April 2022.

== Teams ==
Locations of teams in the 2021–22 Adran Premier

Club	City	Ground
Aberystwyth Town Women's	Aberystwyth	Park Avenue
Barry Town United Women	Barry	Jenner Park
Cardiff City Women	Cardiff	Cardiff International Sports Stadium
Cardiff Met WFC	Cardiff	Cardiff Met Cyncoed Campus
Pontypridd United Women	Pontypridd	UWS Sports Park
Port Talbot Town Ladies	Port Talbot	Victoria Road
Swansea City Ladies	Neath	Llandarcy Academy of Sport
The New Saints FC Women	Oswestry	Park Hall

== League table ==
Pos	Team	Pld	W	D	L	GF	GA	GD	Pts	Qualification (Note: Teams play each other twice (14 matches), before the league is split into two groups (the top four and the bottom four).)
1	Swansea City (C)	20	16	3	1	58	12	+46	51	Qualification for the UEFA Women's Champions League first round
2	Cardiff Metropolitan University	20	15	2	3	65	19	+46	47	
3	Cardiff City	20	13	1	6	54	28	+26	40	
4	Aberystwyth Town	20	6	3	11	18	41	−23	21	
5	Pontypridd United	20	6	2	12	24	38	−14	20	
6	The New Saints	20	6	1	13	26	46	−20	19	
7	Barry Town United	20	6	0	14	31	57	−26	18	
8	Port Talbot Town (R)	20	6	0	14	21	56	−35	18	Relegation to Adran South

Source: Adran Leagues
Rules for classification: 1) Points; 2) Goal difference; 3) Head-to-head points; 4) Goals scored; 5) Matches won.
(C) Champions; (R) Relegated

== Season statistics ==
=== Top scorers ===
Rank	Player	Club	Goals
1	(Wales) Stacey John-Davis	Swansea City	14
2	(Wales) Emily Allen	Cardiff Met	11
2	(Wales) Phoebie Poole	Cardiff City	11
2	(Wales) Catherine Walsh	Cardiff City	11
5	(Wales) Mackenzie Olden	Barry Town United	10
6	(Wales) Chloe Chivers	Swansea City	9
6	(Wales) Katy Hosford	Swansea City	9
