= 2022–23 in Welsh football =

Football in Wales
- Season: 2022–23

2022–23 in Welsh football
- Cymru Premier champions
- The New Saints
- Cymru North champions
- Colwyn Bay
- Cymru South champions
- Barry Town United
- Adran Premier winners
- Cardiff City
- Adran North winners
- Wrexham A.F.C.
- Adran South winners
- Briton Ferry Llansawel
- Teams in Europe
- The New Saints, Bala Town, Newtown, Swansea City Ladies
- Welsh national team(s)
- 2022 FIFA World Cup, UEFA Euro 2024 qualifying, 2023 Pinatar Cup, 2023 FIFA Women's World Cup qualification

The 2022–23 season is the 31st season of competitive football in Wales. The domestic season began on 23 July 2022 with the Cymru Premier League Cup first round matches alongside the first qualifying round of the Welsh Cup which began on 30 July 2022, and the first round of matches in the Cymru Premier were played on 6 August 2022.

== League competitions ==
=== Cymru Premier ===
Pos	Team	Pld	W	D	L	GF	GA	GD	Pts	Qualification or relegation (Note: Teams play each other twice (22 matches), before the league is split into two groups (the top six and the bottom six).)
1	The New Saints (C)	32	26	5	1	112	17	+95	83	Qualification for the Champions League first qualifying round
2	Connah's Quay Nomads	32	17	10	5	45	23	+22	61	Qualification for the Europa Conference League first qualifying round (Note: The 2022–23 Welsh Cup also qualified for the Europa Conference League first qualifying round. Since the cup winners, The New Saints, qualified based on league position, the Europa Conference League spot was passed to the third-placed team.)
3	Penybont	32	16	10	6	51	32	+19	52 (Note: Penybont were deducted six points for fielding ineligible players against Airbus UK Broughton on 3 January 2023 and Cardiff Metropolitan University on 17 February 2023.)	Qualification for the Europa Conference League first qualifying round
4	Cardiff Metropolitan University	32	16	4	12	41	49	−8	52	Qualification for the Europa Conference League play-offs
5	Bala Town	32	12	8	12	51	37	+14	44	Qualification for the Europa Conference League play-offs
6	Newtown	32	12	5	15	49	56	−7	41	Qualification for the Europa Conference League play-offs
7	Haverfordwest County (O)	32	14	5	13	49	44	+5	47	Qualification for the Europa Conference League play-offs
8	Pontypridd United	32	12	5	15	41	52	−11	41	
9	Caernarfon Town	32	12	3	17	51	54	−3	39	
10	Aberystwyth Town	32	11	5	16	41	73	−32	38	
11	Flint Town United (R)	32	9	8	15	41	53	−12	35	Relegation to Cymru North or Cymru South
12	Airbus UK Broughton (R)	32	0	2	30	18	100	−82	−4 (Note: Airbus UK Broughton were deducted six points for fielding ineligible players against Caernarfon Town on 2 September 2022 and Pontypridd United on 11 February 2023.)	Relegation to Cymru North or Cymru South

Source: Cymru Premier
Rules for classification: 1) Points; 2) Goal difference; 3) Head-to-head points; 4) Goals scored; 5) Matches won.
(C) Champions; (O) Play-off winners; (R) Relegated

=== Cymru North ===
Pos	Team	Pld	W	D	L	GF	GA	GD	Pts	Promotion or relegation
1	Colwyn Bay (C, P)	30	27	2	1	101	24	+77	83	Promotion to Cymru Premier
2	Holywell Town	30	26	1	3	75	22	+53	79	
3	Llandudno	30	20	6	4	70	23	+47	66	
4	Guilsfield	30	17	6	7	58	37	+21	57	
5	Ruthin Town	30	16	3	11	48	44	+4	51	
6	Prestatyn Town	30	14	4	12	66	50	+16	46	
7	Cefn Druids	30	13	4	13	48	64	−16	43	
8	Buckley Town	30	12	6	12	53	61	−8	42	
9	Mold Alexandra	30	10	5	15	41	52	−11	35	
10	Gresford Athletic	30	10	5	15	32	43	−11	35	
11	Porthmadog	30	10	3	17	36	53	−17	33	
12	Llanidloes Town	30	7	6	17	42	63	−21	27	
13	Chirk AAA	30	5	11	14	32	49	−17	26	
14	Conwy Borough (R)	30	5	8	17	33	64	−31	23	Relegation to Ardal NE or Ardal NW
15	Penrhyncoch (R)	30	3	7	20	31	72	−41	16	Relegation to Ardal NE or Ardal NW
16	Holyhead Hotspur (R)	30	2	9	19	24	69	−45	15	Relegation to Ardal NE or Ardal NW

Source: Cymru North
Rules for classification: 1) Points; 2) Goal difference; 3) Goals scored; 4) Matches won; 5) Play-off.
(C) Champions; (P) Promoted; (R) Relegated

=== Cymru South ===
Pos	Team	Pld	W	D	L	GF	GA	GD	Pts	Promotion or relegation
1	Barry Town United (C, P)	30	25	3	2	78	25	+53	78	Promotion to Cymru Premier
2	Llanelli Town	30	19	5	6	63	34	+29	62	
3	Briton Ferry Llansawel	30	17	9	4	72	33	+39	60	
4	Carmarthen Town	30	16	4	10	66	41	+25	52	
5	Cambrian & Clydach Vale BGC	30	14	5	11	64	53	+11	47	
6	Afan Lido	30	13	8	9	61	52	+9	47	
7	Llantwit Major	30	13	6	11	46	40	+6	45	
8	Cwmbran Celtic	30	10	8	12	62	53	+9	38	
9	Pontardawe Town	30	12	1	17	51	73	−22	37	
10	Ammanford	30	8	9	13	40	57	−17	33	
11	Taff's Well	30	8	8	14	50	54	−4	32	
12	Goytre United	30	8	8	14	45	67	−22	32	
13	Abergavenny Town	30	9	5	16	35	60	−25	32	
14	Trefelin BGC (Note: Trefelin BGC were reprieved from relegation after no team was relegated to the 2023–24 Cymru South from the 2022–23 Cymru Premier or moved to the 2023–24 Cymru South from the 2022–23 Cymru North.)	30	7	6	17	47	70	−23	27	
15	Swansea University (R)	30	6	8	16	30	64	−34	26	Relegation to Ardal SE or Ardal SW
16	Ynyshir Albions (R)	30	7	3	20	33	67	−34	24	Relegation to Ardal SE or Ardal SW

Source: Cymru South
Rules for classification: 1) Points; 2) Goal difference; 3) Goals scored; 4) Matches won; 5) Play-off.
(C) Champions; (P) Promoted; (R) Relegated

=== Adran Premier ===
Pos	Team	Pld	W	D	L	GF	GA	GD	Pts	Qualification (Note: Teams play each other twice (14 matches), before the league is split into two groups (the top four and the bottom four).)
1	Cardiff City (C)	20	17	3	0	70	12	+58	54	Qualification for the UEFA Women's Champions League first round
2	Swansea City	20	12	5	3	52	20	+32	41	
3	Cardiff Metropolitan University	20	9	2	9	38	43	−5	29	
4	The New Saints	20	8	2	10	43	50	−7	26	
5	Pontypridd United	20	9	4	7	35	27	+8	31	
6	Aberystwyth Town	20	7	3	10	31	37	−6	24	
7	Barry Town United	20	4	3	13	21	52	−31	15	
8	Abergavenny Town (R)	20	2	2	16	14	63	−49	8	Relegation to Adran South

Source: Adran Leagues
Rules for classification: 1) Points; 2) Goal difference; 3) Head-to-head points; 4) Goals scored; 5) Matches won.
(C) Champions; (R) Relegated

== Honours ==
=== Domestic honours ===
Competition	Winner	Score	Runner-up	Match report
Welsh Cup	The New Saints	6–0	Bala Town	BBC Sport
League Cup	Bala Town	0–0 (a.e.t.) (4–3 pens.)	Connah's Quay Nomads	BBC Sport
Women's Cup	Cardiff City	4–0	Briton Ferry Llansawel	FAW
Amateur Trophy	Trethomas Bluebirds	2–1	Denbigh Town	FAW
Youth Cup	The New Saints	5–2	Penybont	FAW
FAW Girls' Cup	Barry Town United	6–0	Abergavenny Town	FAW

=== Non-league honours ===
Level	Competition	Winner
3	Ardal NE	Caersws
3	Ardal NW	Denbigh Town
3	Ardal SE	Abertillery Bluebirds
3	Ardal SW	Caerau Ely
4	North East Wales Football League Premier Division	Queens Park
4	North Wales Coast East Football League	St Asaph City
4	North Wales Coast West Football League	Bodedern Athletic
4	Central Wales Football League North Division	Kerry
4	Central Wales Football League South Division	Radnor Valley
4	West Wales Premier League	Penlan
4	South Wales Alliance League Premier Division	Cardiff Corinthians
4	Gwent County League Premier Division	Aberbargoed Buds

=== Individual honours ===
==== FAW Wales awards ====
As announced on 20 May 2023.

Award	Winner	Team
Cymru Premier Manager of the Season	Rhys Griffiths	Penybont
Cymru Premier Player of the Season	Declan McManus	The New Saints
Cymru Premier Young Player of the Season	Ryan Reynolds	Penybont
Cymru North Player of the Season	Tom McCready	Colwyn Bay
Cymru South Player of the Season	Kayne McLaggon	Barry Town United
Adran Premier Player of the Season	Ffion Price	Cardiff City
Adran North Player of the Season	Rosie Hughes	Wrexham AFC Women
Adran South Player of the Season	Lowri Ridings	Briton Ferry Llansawel

== Welsh clubs in Europe ==
=== Summary ===
Club	Competitions	Started round	Final round	Coef.
The New Saints	UEFA Champions League	First qualifying round	First qualifying round	1.500
The New Saints	UEFA Conference League	Second qualifying round	Second qualifying round	1.500
Bala Town	UEFA Europa Conference League	First qualifying round	First qualifying round	1.000
Newtown	UEFA Conference League	First qualifying round	Second qualifying round	1.500
Swansea City Ladies	UEFA Women's Champions League	Round 1 - Semi-finals	Round 1 - Third place match	1.000
Total				5.000
Average				1.250

=== The New Saints ===
UEFA Champions League

The New Saints entered the 2022–23 UEFA Champions League in the first qualifying round, having won the 2021–22 Cymru Premier.

5 July 2022 First qualifying round	The New Saints (Wales)	1–0	(Northern Ireland) Linfield	Park Hall, Oswestry
20:00 (19:00 BST)	Brobbel 57'	Report		Attendance: 1,034; Referee: Andrei Chivulete (Romania)

13 July 2022 First qualifying round	Linfield (Northern Ireland)	2–0 (a.e.t.)	(Wales) The New Saints	Windsor Park, Belfast
20:45 (19:45 BST)	Mulgrew 90+4'; Devine 95'	Report		Attendance: 2,971; Referee: Duje Strukan (Croatia)

Linfield won 2–1 on aggregate.

UEFA Europa Conference League

21 July 2022 Second qualifying round	Víkingur Reykjavík (Iceland)	2–0	(Wales) The New Saints	Víkingsvöllur, Reykjavík
21:30 (19:30 WET)	K. Ingason 29' (pen.), 57' (pen.)	Report		Attendance: 812; Referee: Peter Kráľovič (Slovakia)

26 July 2022 Second qualifying round	The New Saints (Wales)	0–0	(Iceland) Víkingur Reykjavík	Park Hall, Oswestry
19:15 (18:15 BST)		Report		Attendance: 537; Referee: Ivaylo Stoyanov (Bulgaria)

Víkingur Reykjavík won 2–0 on aggregate.

=== Bala Town ===
UEFA Europa Conference League

Bala Town entered the 2022–23 UEFA Europa Conference League in the first qualifying round, having finished 2nd place in the 2021–22 Cymru Premier.

7 July 2022 First qualifying round	Bala Town (Wales)	1–2	(Republic of Ireland) Sligo Rovers	Park Hall, Oswestry (Note: Bala Town played their home match at Park Hall in Oswestry, instead of their regular stadium, Maes Tegid, in Bala, which did not meet UEFA requirements.)
20:00 (19:00 BST)	Mendes 6'	Report	Keena 28'; Mata 49'	Attendance: 1,034; Referee: Jason Barcelo (Gibraltar)

14 July 2022 First qualifying round	Sligo Rovers (Republic of Ireland)	0–1 (a.e.t.) (4–3 p)	(Wales) Bala Town	The Showgrounds, Sligo
20:00 (19:00 IST)		Report	Edwards 35'	Attendance: 3,850; Referee: Jochem Kamphuis (Netherlands)
	Penalties
	Cawley (penalty scored); Kirk (penalty scored); Keena (penalty scored); Blaney (penalty scored)		(penalty scored) Venables; (penalty scored) Edwards; (penalty missed) Spittle; (penalty scored) Kay; (penalty missed) Wall

2–2 on aggregate. Sligo Rovers won 4–3 on penalties.

=== Newtown ===
UEFA Europa Conference League

Newtown entered the 2022–23 UEFA Europa Conference League in the first qualifying round, having finished 3rd place in the 2021–22 Cymru Premier.

7 July 2022 First qualifying round	HB (Faroe Islands)	1–0	(Wales) Newtown	Gundadalur, Tórshavn
20:00 (19:00 WEST)	Wardum 66'	Report		Attendance: 500; Referee: Robertas Valikonis (Lithuania)

14 July 2022 First qualifying round	Newtown (Wales)	2–1 (a.e.t.) (4–2 p)	(Faroe Islands) HB	Park Hall, Oswestry (Note: Newtown played their home matches at Park Hall in Oswestry, instead of their regular stadium, the Latham Park, in Newtown, which did not meet UEFA requirements.)
19:15 (18:15 BST)	Cowans 35'; Mwandwe 45+1'	Report	Petersen 48'	Attendance: 794; Referee: Walter Altmann (Austria)
	Penalties
	Jones (penalty missed); Rushton (penalty scored); Ismail (penalty scored); Cowans (penalty scored); Mwandwe (penalty scored)		(penalty missed) Dalbúð; (penalty scored) Jónsson; (penalty missed) Johansen; (penalty scored) Samuelsen

2–2 on aggregate. Newtown won 4–2 on penalties.

21 July 2022 Second qualifying round	Spartak Trnava (Slovakia)	4–1	(Wales) Newtown	Štadión Antona Malatinského, Trnava
20:30	Yusuf 17', 41', 44'; Iván 75'	Report	Cowans 23'	Attendance: 5,247; Referee: Luka Bilbija (Bosnia and Herzegovina)

28 July 2022 Second qualifying round	Newtown (Wales)	1–2	(Slovakia) Spartak Trnava	Park Hall, Oswestry
19:15	A. Williams 35' (pen.)	Report	Štefánik 73'; Bukata 79'	Attendance: 654; Referee: Aristotelis Diamantopoulos (Greece)

Spartak Trnava won 6–2 on aggregate.

=== Swansea City Ladies ===
UEFA Women's Champions League

Swansea City Ladies entered the 2022–23 UEFA Women's Champions League in the first qualifying round, having won the 2021–22 Adran Premier.

18 August 2022 Round 1 - Semi-finals	PAOK (Greece)	2–0	(Wales) Swansea City	Katerini Stadium, Katerini
15:30	Vlassopoulos 16', 70'	Report		Attendance: 200; Referee: Olivia Tschon (Austria)

21 August 2022 Round 1 - Third place play-off	Swansea City (Wales)	0–7	(Hungary) Ferencváros	Katerini Stadium, Katerini
20:30		Report	Fishley 35'; Szabó 38', 55'; Bradić 51'; Papp 70'; Barker 83'; Lake 87' (og.)	Attendance: 45; Referee: Kateryna Usova (Ukraine)

== Wales men's national football team ==
=== 2022 ===
1 June 2022 Nations League A	Poland	2–1	Wales	Wrocław, Poland
18:00 UTC+2	Kamiński 72'; Świderski 85'	UEFA report BBC report	J. Williams 52'	Stadium: Stadion Wrocław; Attendance: 35,214; Referee: Rade Obrenovič (Slovenia)

5 June 2022 2022 World Cup qual PO Final	Wales	1–0	Ukraine	Cardiff, Wales
17:00 UTC+1	Andriy Yarmolenko 34' (o.g.)	BBC report		Stadium: Cardiff City Stadium; Attendance: 32,660; Referee: Antonio Mateu Lahoz (Spain)

8 June 2022 Nations League A	Wales	1–2	Netherlands	Cardiff, Wales
19:45 UTC+1	Norrington-Davies 90+2'	UEFA report BBC report	Koopmeiners 50'; Weghorst 90+4'	Stadium: Cardiff City Stadium; Attendance: 23,395; Referee: Glenn Nyberg (Sweden)

11 June 2022 Nations League A	Wales	1–1	Belgium	Cardiff, Wales
19:45 UTC+1	Johnson 86'	BBC report UEFA report	Tielemans 51'	Stadium: Cardiff City Stadium; Attendance: 27,188; Referee: Benoît Bastien (France)

14 June 2022 Nations League A	Netherlands	3–2	Wales	Rotterdam, Netherlands
20:45 UTC+2	Lang 17'; Gakpo 23'; Depay 90+3'	BBC report UEFA report	Johnson 26'; Bale 90+2' (pen.)	Stadium: Stadion Feijenoord; Attendance: 37,247; Referee: Horațiu Feșnic (Romania)

22 September 2022 Nations League A	Belgium	2–1	Wales	Brussels, Belgium
20:45 UTC+2	De Bruyne 10'; Batshuayi 37'	BBC report UEFA report	Moore 50'	Stadium: King Baudouin Stadium; Attendance: 28,463; Referee: Ali Palabıyık (Turkey)

25 September 2022 Nations League A	Wales	0–1	Poland	Cardiff, Wales
19:45 UTC+1		BBC report UEFA report	Świderski 57'	Stadium: Cardiff City Stadium; Attendance: 31,520; Referee: Andris Treimanis (Latvia)

21 November 2022 2022 FIFA World Cup Group B	United States	1–1	Wales	Al Rayyan, Qatar
22:00 UTC+3	Weah 36'	FIFA report BBC report	Bale 82' (pen.)	Stadium: Ahmad bin Ali Stadium; Attendance: 43,418; Referee: Abdulrahman Al-Jassim (Qatar)

25 November 2022 2022 FIFA World Cup Group B	Wales	0–2	Iran	Al Rayyan, Qatar
13:00 UTC+3		FIFA report BBC report	Cheshmi 90+8'; Rezaeian 90+11'	Stadium: Ahmad bin Ali Stadium; Attendance: 40,875; Referee: Mario Escobar (Guatemala)

29 November 2022 2022 FIFA World Cup Group B	Wales	0–3	England	Al Rayyan, Qatar
22:00 UTC+3		FIFA report BBC report	Rashford 50', 68'; Foden 51'	Stadium: Ahmad bin Ali Stadium; Attendance: 44,297; Referee: Slavko Vinčić (Slovenia)

=== 2023 ===
25 March 2023 UEFA Euro 2024 qualifying	Croatia	1–1	Wales	Split, Croatia
20:45 UTC+2	Kramarić 28'	UEFA Report; BBC report	Broadhead 90+3'	Stadium: Stadion Poljud; Attendance: 33,474; Referee: João Pinheiro (Portugal)

28 March 2023 UEFA Euro 2024 qualifying	Wales	1–0	Latvia	Cardiff, Wales
19:45 UTC+1	Moore 41'	UEFA Report; BBC report		Stadium: Cardiff City Stadium; Attendance: 32,806; Referee: Giorgi Kruashvili (Georgia)

== Wales women's national football team ==
=== 2022 ===
28 June Friendly	Wales	0–0	New Zealand	San Pedro del Pinatar, Spain
18:00 UTC+1		Report		Stadium: Pinatar Arena

2 September 2023 FIFA Women's World Cup qualification – UEFA Group I	Greece	0–1	Wales	Volos, Greece
18:00 UTC+2		Report	Jones 34'	Stadium: Panthessaliko Stadium; Referee: Monika Mularczyk (Poland)

6 September 2023 FIFA Women's World Cup qualification – UEFA Group I	Wales	0–0	Slovenia	Cardiff, Wales
19:45 UTC+1		Report		Stadium: Cardiff City Stadium; Referee: Kateryna Monzul (Ukraine)

6 October 2023 FIFA Women's World Cup qualification – UEFA play-offs	Wales	1–0 (a.e.t.)	Bosnia and Herzegovina	Cardiff, Wales
19:15 UTC+1	Fishlock 105+2'	Report		Stadium: Cardiff City Stadium; Attendance: 15,200; Referee: Marta Huerta de Aza (Spain)

11 October 2023 FIFA Women's World Cup qualification – UEFA play-offs	Switzerland	2–1 (a.e.t.)	Wales	Zürich, Switzerland
18:00 UTC+1	Bachmann 45'; Humm 120+1'	Report	Roberts 19'	Stadium: Letzigrund; Attendance: 7,803; Referee: Tess Olofsson (Sweden)

12 November Friendly	Wales	1–1	Finland	San Pedro del Pinatar, Spain
18:30 UTC+0	Jones 31'	Report

=== 2023 ===
15 February 2023 Pinatar Cup	Wales	1–0	Philippines	San Pedro del Pinatar, Spain
19:30 UTC+1	Green 45+1' (pen.)	Report		Stadium: Pinatar Arena; Referee: Lucie Šulcová (Czech Republic)

18 February 2023 Pinatar Cup	Wales	0–0	Iceland	San Pedro del Pinatar, Spain
19:30 UTC+1		Report		Stadium: Pinatar Arena; Referee: Lucie Šulcová (Czech Republic)

21 February 2023 Pinatar Cup	Scotland	1–1	Wales	San Pedro del Pinatar, Spain
14:05 UTC+1	Howard 8'	Report	Holland 42'	Stadium: Pinatar Arena; Referee: Lucie Šulcová (Czech Republic)

6 April Friendly	Wales	4–1	Northern Ireland	Cardiff
19:15 UTC+0	Fishlock 16'; James 25'; Cain 30'; Rowe 64'	Report	Wade 73'	Stadium: Cardiff City Stadium; Attendance: 6,831; Referee: Stacey Pearson

11 April Friendly	Portugal	1–1	Wales	Guimarães, Portugal
19:15 UTC+1	Telma 50'	Report	Rowe 73'	Stadium: Estádio D. Afonso Henriques; Attendance: 11,055; Referee: Deborah Anex
