= 2011–12 Welsh Premier Women's League =

Welsh Premier League (women)
- Season: 2011–12
- Champions: UWIC Ladies
- UEFA Women's Champions League: UWIC Ladies
- Matches: 41
- Goals: 165 (4.02 per match)

The 2011–12 Welsh Premier League is the third season of the Women's Welsh Premier League, Wales' premier football league. Northop Hall Girls replaced Llandudno Junction Ladies in the Northern Conference.

The season kicked off on Sunday, 25 September 2011, with the final being played on 13 May 2012. It was the last season to feature a championship final, following the introduction of a 12-team league from the 2012–13 season. As a result of that, no team was relegated this year.

== Clubs ==
Locations of teams in the 2011–12 Premier League

Team	Conference	City	Ground
Aberystwyth Town Ladies	North	Aberystwyth	Park Avenue
Caernarfon Town Ladies	North	Caernarfon	The Oval
Caerphilly Castle Ladies	South	Caerphilly	Owain Glyndwr Playing Fields
Llanidloes Ladies	North	Llanidloes	Cae Hafren
Newcastle Emlyn Ladies	South	Newcastle Emlyn	Parc Emlyn
Northop Hall Girls	North	Rhydymwyn	Dolfechlas Road, Rhydymwyn F.C.
Swansea City Ladies	South	Port Talbot	Baglan Playing Fields
Trefelin Ladies	South	Cwmafan, Port Talbot	The Ynys
UWIC Ladies	South	Cardiff	Cardiff University, Cyncoed Campus
Wrexham Ladies	North	Wrexham	Stansty Park, Lex XI F.C.

== Northern conference ==
Pos	Team	Pld	W	D	L	GF	GA	GD	Pts	Qualification	WRE	LLA	CTL	ABE	NOR
1	Wrexham Ladies (Q)	8	6	1	1	30	13	+17	19	Championship final		3–2	4–2	4–2	4–1
2	Llanidloes Ladies	8	4	1	3	21	11	+10	13		3–2		2–2	2–0	7–1
3	Caernarfon Town Ladies	8	4	1	3	19	14	+5	13		1–3	1–0		3–0	5–0
4	Aberystwyth Town Ladies	8	4	1	3	15	13	+2	13		1–1	2–1	3–0		4–0
5	Northop Hall Girls	8	0	0	8	7	41	−34	0		1–9	0–4	2–5	2–3	

(Q) Qualified for the phase indicated

== Southern conference ==
=== Standings ===
Pos	Team	Pld	W	D	L	GF	GA	GD	Pts	Qualification	UWIC	SWA	TRE	CCL	NEW
1	UWIC Ladies (Q)	8	6	1	1	19	5	+14	19	Championship final		2–0	4–0	1–0	3–1
2	Swansea City Ladies	8	4	3	1	16	9	+7	15		1–0		0–0	3–0	5–1
3	Trefelin Ladies	8	3	2	3	15	17	−2	11		0–4	3–3		1–2	5–2
4	Caerphilly Castle Ladies	8	1	2	5	9	16	−7	5		1–3	1–2	2–3		2–2
5	Newcastle Emlyn Ladies	8	0	4	4	11	23	−12	4		2–2	2–2	0–3	1–1	

(Q) Qualified for the phase indicated

== Championship final ==
The third (and final, due to league restructuring for 2012-13) Championship Final is the first to not include either Swansea City or Caernarfon Town. UWIC won the championship final against Wrexham and will represent Wales in the 2012–13 UEFA Women's Champions League.

13 May 2012
14:00

Wrexham Ladies	0–3	UWIC Ladies
		Nadia Lawrence; Sophie Scherschel; Lauran Welsh

Victoria Park, Llanidloes
