= 2026–27 Adran Premier =

Welsh women's football league season

Adran Premier
- Season: 2026–27
- Dates: 6 September 2026 – 4 April 2027

The 2026–27 season of the Adran Premier, also known as Genero Adran Premier for sponsorship reasons, is the 18th season, 6th since the establishment of the current format, of the top-level women's football league in Wales.

Wrexham are the defending champions, having won their first ever title in the 2025–26 season.

== Teams ==
Locations of teams in the 2026–27 Adran Premier.

Team	Home city	Home ground	Capacity	2025–26 finish
Aberystwyth Town	Aberystwyth	Park Avenue	5,000	7th
Barry Town United	Barry	Jenner Park Stadium	2,650	6th
Briton Ferry Llansawel	Briton Ferry	Old Road Ground	2,000	5th
Cardiff City	Cardiff	Cardiff International Sports Stadium	4,953	2nd
Cardiff Met	Cardiff	Cardiff Met Cyncoed Campus	1,620	1st (Adran South)
Swansea City	Swansea	Stafford Common	2,000	3rd
The New Saints	Oswestry	Park Hall	3,000	4th
Wrexham	Wrexham	The Rock	3,000	1st

=== Team changes ===
Entering league	Exiting league
Promoted from 2025-26 Adran South	Relegated to 2026-27 Adran South
Cardiff Met	Pontypridd United

== Regular season ==
=== League table ===
Pos	Team	Pld	W	D	L	GF	GA	GD	Pts	Qualification
1	Wrexham	9	8	0	1	47	8	+39	24	Advances to championship conference
2	The New Saints	9	7	1	1	33	9	+24	22	Advances to championship conference
3	Cardiff City	9	7	0	2	37	12	+25	21	Advances to championship conference
4	Swansea City	9	5	0	4	18	20	−2	15	Advances to championship conference
5	Briton Ferry Llansawel	9	3	1	5	19	27	−8	10	Participates in plate conference
6	Cardiff Met	9	2	2	5	8	25	−17	8	Participates in plate conference
7	Barry Town United	9	0	3	6	9	36	−27	3	Participates in plate conference
8	Aberystwyth Town	9	0	1	8	4	38	−34	1	Participates in plate conference

Updated to match(es) played on 1 November 2026. Source: FAW.cymru
Rules for classification: Tiebreakers

=== Results ===
Home \ Away	ABE	BAR	BRI	CAC	CAM	SWA	TNS	WRE
Aberystwyth Town		2–2		0–10	0–1	0–1	0–7	
Barry Town United			1–4	1–4		0–4	1–1	1–3
Briton Ferry Llansawel	7–1			0–6	1–1			1–8
Cardiff City			3–2		7–1	3–1	1–0	2–4
Cardiff Met	2–1	2–2				0–2	0–2	
Swansea City			0–3	3–1	3–1			1–8
The New Saints	4–0	9–1	3–1			4–3		
Wrexham	4–0	7–0	4–0		7–0		2–3	

Updated to match(es) played on 1 November 2026. Source: FAW.cymru
Legend: Blue = home team win; Yellow = draw; Red = away team win.
