= 2010–11 Welsh Premier Women's League =

Welsh Premier League (women)
- Season: 2010–11
- Champions: Swansea City Ladies
- UEFA Women's Champions League: Swansea City Ladies
- Matches: 41
- Goals: 156 (3.8 per match)

The 2010–11 Welsh Premier League was the second season of the Welsh Premier League (women), Wales' premier football league. The league was increased to ten teams this season.

== Teams ==
Locations of teams in the 2010–11 Premier League

The league was increased from 8 to 10 teams, 5 per conference.

The new teams were Llandudno Junction Ladies in the north, a planned newcomer, as were Caerphilly Castle Ladies in the south. Trefelin Ladies were the third newcomer, replacing Manorbier Ladies, who withdrew from the league.

== Northern conference ==
=== Standings ===
Pos	Team	Pld	W	D	L	GF	GA	GD	Pts	Qualification or relegation
1	Caernarfon Town Ladies	8	6	1	1	20	8	+12	19	Participant of Final
2	Llanidloes Ladies	8	5	1	2	17	10	+7	16	
3	Wrexham Ladies	8	3	2	3	11	10	+1	11	
4	Aberystwyth Town Ladies	8	2	2	4	7	11	−4	8	
5	Llandudno Junction Ladies	8	0	2	6	5	21	−16	2	Relegation

=== Results ===
Home \ Away	WRE	LLA	JUN	ABE	CAE
Wrexham Ladies		3–1	0–0	3–1	0–1
Llanidloes Ladies	2–0		2–1	2–1	2–0
Llandudno Junction Ladies	1–3	1–5		0–0	0–6
Aberystwyth Town Ladies	2–2	1–0	1–0		1–2
Caernarfon Town Ladies	2–0	3–3	4–2	2–0	

Legend: Blue = home team win; Yellow = draw; Red = away team win.

== Southern conference ==
=== Standings ===
Somehow Newcastle wasn't relegated.

Pos	Team	Pld	W	D	L	GF	GA	GD	Pts	Qualification
1	Swansea City Ladies	8	7	1	0	32	8	+24	22	Participant of Final
2	UWIC Ladies	8	6	1	1	24	10	+14	19	
3	Caerphilly Castle Ladies	8	4	0	4	24	14	+10	12	
4	Trefelin Ladies	8	2	0	6	10	26	−16	6	
5	Newcastle Emlyn Ladies	8	0	0	8	3	35	−32	0	

=== Results ===
Home \ Away	CAE	SWA	NEW	UWI	TRE
Caerphilly Castle Ladies		1–3	5–0	2–4	4–1
Swansea City Ladies	2–1		8–1	4–3	6–0
Newcastle Emlyn Ladies	0–5	1–4		0–2	1–4
UWIC Ladies	4–3	1–1	2–0		4–0
Trefelin Ladies	0–3	0–4	5–0	0–4	

Legend: Blue = home team win; Yellow = draw; Red = away team win.

== Final ==
The final was played on 15 May 2011 and contested by the same teams as last year. Swansea won 3–1 and thus entered the 2011–12 UEFA Women's Champions League as Welsh champion.

15 May 2011
14:30

Swansea City Ladies	3–1	Caernarfon Town Ladies
Jodie Passmore; Laura-May Walkley; Lindsay Morgan 90'		Jordanne Greenough 86'

Victoria Avenue, Llanidloes
