= 2023–24 FAW Women's Cup =

Tournament details
- Country: Wales
- Teams: 44

Final positions
- Champions: Cardiff City F.C.
- Runners-up: Wrexham

The 2023–24 FAW Women's Cup (also known as Bute Energy Welsh Cup for sponsorship reasons) is the 30th edition of the FAW Women's Cup, the premier knock-out cup competition for women's association football teams in Wales.

== Format ==
The tournament is a single-elimination tournament, with 24 clubs in the qualifying round, and 20 joining in the first round proper.

== Qualifying round ==
Home team	Result	Away team
18 September 2023
Aberaman	6–3	Wattsville
Aberystwyth University	1–13	Carmarthen Town
Ammanford	2–2 (4–3 p)	Taffs Well
Bangor	2–0	Airbus UK Broughton
Coed Duon	5–2	Cambrian & Clydach Vale
Llanelli Town	19–0	Morriston Town
Llangefni Town	5–2	Denbigh Town
Penclawdd	2–0	Johnstown
Penybont	14–0	Coedffranc
Penydarren	1–4	Newport City
Pwllheli	4–1	Kinmel Bay
Welshpool Town	0–11	NFA

== First round ==
Home team	Result	Away team
15 October 2023
North Section
Pwllheli	0–13	Wrexham
Llanfair United	0–3	Aberystwyth Town
Bangor	1–6	Y Felinheli
The New Saints	3–0	Connahs Quay Nomads
NFA	0–5	Llandudno
Rhyl	4–2	Llangefni Town
South Section
Pontypridd United	9–0	Penclawdd
Llanelli Town	0–14	Cardiff City
Cascade YC	5–0	Carmarthen Town
Caldicot Town	1–4	Briton Ferry Llansawel
Swansea University	3–3 (6–5 p)	Barry Town United
Penybont	5–1	Newport City
Cardiff Met	1–2	Swansea City
Pontardawe Town	walkover	Coed Duon
Ammanford	1–5	Cwmbran Celtic
Postponed (22 October 2023)
Cardiff Wanderers	3–4	Aberaman

== Second round ==
Home team	Result	Away team
12 November 2023
North Section
Rhyl	0–8	Aberystwyth Town
The New Saints	4–0	Felinheli
Wrexham	1–0	Llandudno
South Section
Pontypridd United	17–0	Aberaman
Penybont	0–6	Cascade YC
Cardiff City	5–0	Swansea University
November 19, 2023
Pontardawe Town	1–2	Briton Ferry Llansawel
November 26, 2023
Cwmbran Celtic	3–8	Swansea City

== Quarter-finals ==
Home team	Result	Away team
10 December 2023
Wrexham	2–0	Briton Ferry Llansawel
The New Saints	2–2 (4–2 p)	Aberystwyth Town
Pontypridd United	0–3	Cardiff City
Cascade YC	1–6	Swansea City

== Semi-finals ==
3 March 2024
14:00 BST

Swansea City	1–3	Cardiff City
John-Davies 11'	Report	Cook 8'; Kehoe 84'; Bowen 89'

The SDM Glass Stadium, Bridgend, Wales
3 March 2024
17:10 BST

The New Saints	0–1	Wrexham
	Report	Hughes 45'

Cae-y-Castell, Flint, Flintshire, Wales
Referee: Nicholas Pratt

== Final ==
5 May 2024
17:25 BST

Cardiff City	2–0	Wrexham
Oakley 16'; Beynon 92'	Report

Rodney Parade, Newport, Wales
Attendance: 1,734
Referee: Cheryl Foster
