= 2023–24 Adran Premier =

Welsh women's football season

Adran Premier
- Season: 2023–24
- Dates: 17 September 2023 - 7 April 2024
- Champions: Cardiff City Women
- Relegated: Pontypridd United
- Matches: 80
- Goals: 282 (3.53 per match)
- Top goalscorer: Eliza Collie (17)
- Biggest home win: Cardiff City 6–1 Barry Town
- Biggest away win: The New Saints 0–6 Cardiff City
- All statistics correct as of 2024-4-18.

The 2023–24 Adran Premier season (also known as Genero Adran Premier for sponsorship reasons), is the third edition of the Adran Premier, the highest level of league competition for women's football in Wales, and the fifteenth season of top-flight women's football in Wales overall. The competition started on September 17, 2023. This season saw a rise in the number of matches broadcast on television, including a doubling of those shown on Welsh public channel S4C.

As in the previous season, this season is split into two groups (top 4 and bottom 4) after the 14th game, and each group plays a double round robin to make 20 total games. The top team qualifies for a spot in the UEFA Women's Champions League.

== Teams ==
Locations of teams in the 2023–24 Adran Premier

The league has eight teams:

Club	City	Ground
Aberystwyth Town Women's	Aberystwyth	Park Avenue
Barry Town United Women	Barry	Jenner Park
Cardiff City Women	Cardiff	Cardiff International Sports Stadium
Cardiff Met WFC	Cardiff	Cardiff Met Cyncoed Campus
Pontypridd United Women	Pontypridd	UWS Sports Park
Swansea City Ladies	Neath	Llandarcy Academy of Sport
The New Saints FC Women	Oswestry	Park Hall
Wrexham A.F.C. Women	Wrexham	The Rock

=== Changes ===
- Promoted from Adran North: Wrexham A.F.C. Women
- Relegated to Adran South: Abergavenny Women

== League table ==
Pos	Team	Pld	W	D	L	GF	GA	GD	Pts	Qualification
1	Cardiff City	20	17	1	2	62	12	+50	52	Qualification for the UEFA Women's Champions League first round
2	Swansea City	20	13	4	3	44	21	+23	43	
3	Wrexham	20	11	2	7	41	37	+4	35	
4	Aberystwyth Town	20	4	7	9	22	33	−11	19	
5	The New Saints	20	9	2	9	46	46	0	29	
6	Cardiff Metropolitan University	20	6	5	9	28	41	−13	23	
7	Barry Town United	20	6	1	13	23	45	−22	19	
8	Pontypridd United	20	1	4	15	15	46	−31	7	Relegation to Adran South

Source: Adran Leagues
Rules for classification: 1) Points; 2) Goal difference; 3) Head-to-head points; 4) Goals scored; 5) Matches won.
Teams play each other twice (14 matches), before the league is split into two groups (the top four and the bottom four).

== Results ==
=== Matches 1–14 ===
Teams play each other twice, once at home and once away.

Home \ Away	ABE	BAR	CAR	CMU	PNT	SWA	TNS	WXM
Aberystwyth Town	—	3–0	0–5	4–0	2–0	0–4	3–3	1–2
Barry Town United	0–2	—	1–3	4–2	2–0	0–4	4–1	1–5
Cardiff City	0–0	6–1	—	3–0	2–1	0–2	3–1	3–0
Cardiff Metropolitan University	1–1	0–1	1–3	—	1–0	3–1	4–4	0–3
Pontypridd United	1–1	0–3	1–5	0–1	—	1–2	1–3	0–3
Swansea City	1–1	3–0	0–1	3–0	3–1	—	5–0	2–1
The New Saints	4–3	5–0	0–5	4–1	3–1	1–2	—	2–3
Wrexham	1–0	1–0	0–3	2–2	3–2	3–3	3–1	—

Updated to match(es) played on 4 February 2024. Source: Adran League
Legend: Blue = home team win; Yellow = draw; Red = away team win.

=== Matches 15–20 ===
After fourteen matches, the league splits into two sections of four teams (i.e. the top four and the bottom four), with the teams playing every other team in their section twice (once at home and once away). The exact matches are determined by the position of the teams in the league table at the time of the split.

==== Championship (top four) ====
Home \ Away	ABE	CAR	SWA	WXM
Aberystwyth Town	—	0–2	0–0	0–2
Cardiff City	3–0	—	4–0	5–1
Swansea City	1–1	2–0	—	3–2
Wrexham	3–0	1–6	2–3	—

Source: Adran League
Legend: Blue = home team win; Yellow = draw; Red = away team win.

==== Plate (bottom four) ====
Home \ Away	BAR	CMU	PNT	TNS
Barry Town United	—	1–2	1–1	3–0
Cardiff Metropolitan University	2–0	—	1–1	4–1
Pontypridd United	2–1	2–2	—	0–3
The New Saints	3–0	3–1	4–0	—

Source: Adran League
Legend: Blue = home team win; Yellow = draw; Red = away team win.

== Season statistics ==
=== Top scorers ===
Rank	Player	Club	Goals
1	(Wales) Eliza Collie	Cardiff City	17
2	(Wales) Katy Hosford	Swansea	15
2	(Wales) Rosie Hughes	Wrexham	15
4	(New Zealand) Molly Kehoe	Cardiff City	9
4	(Wales) Emily Ridge	TNS	9
