= 2023–24 Adran Trophy =

Tournament details
- Country: Wales

The 2023–24 Adran Trophy (also known as Genero Adran Trophy for sponsorship reasons) is the 10th edition of the Adran Trophy (formerly known as the Premier League Cup), a knock-out cup competition specialised for women's association football teams in Wales.

== Round of 16 ==
Home team	Result	Away team
3 December 2023
Pontypridd United	1–1 (5–6 p)	Swansea University
Connah's Quay Nomads	0–5	Aberystwyth Town
Llandudno	0–13	Swansea City
Cardiff City	21–0	Pontardawe Town
Cardiff Met	10–0	Coed Duon
12 December
The New Saints	9–0	Rhyl 1879
17 December
Wrexham	4–0	Briton Ferry Llansawel
Postponed
Felinheli	walkover	Barry Town United

== Quarter-finals ==
Home team	Result	Away team
7 January 2024
Swansea University	0–5	The New Saints
Swansea City	5–0	Cardiff Met
Wrexham	1–3	Cardiff City
18 February 2024
Felinheli	0–4	Aberystwyth Town

== Semi-finals ==
Home team	Result	Away team
25 February 2024
Cardiff City	4–0	Aberystwyth Town
The New Saints	1–5	Swansea City

== Final ==
14 April 2024
Final

Cardiff City	5–1	Swansea City

SDM Glass Stadium, Bridgend
