= Women's football in Wales =

- Country: Wales
- Governing body: Football Association of Wales
- National team: Women's national team

Club competitions
- Adran Premier; Adran North; Adran South; FAW Women's Cup; Adran Trophy

International competitions
- Champions League; FIFA Women's World Cup (National Team); European Championship(National Team)

Women's football in Wales is overseen by the Football Association of Wales and is affiliated with both the world (FIFA) and European (UEFA) football governing bodies. As such the national team are eligible to compete in the World Cup and the European Championship. The winners of the top tier league is invited to join the qualifying stage of the Champions League.

== History ==
Women's football first became popular in Wales during WW1. In March 1922, following complaints from religious congregations, the Football Association of Wales also implemented a total ban. However, the ban was initially less comprehensive and less consistently applied than in England, with the Marquis of Bute authorising Dick, Kerr Ladies F.C. to hold a charity match against Olympic de Paris just three weeks after the FAW announced the ban. The match, held at Cardiff Arms Park, attracted an audience of 15,000 and raised funds for the restoration of Reims Cathedral. In 1939, the FAW instituted a stronger version of the ban, decreeing that "no football match in which any lady or ladies take part in any way whatsoever shall be permitted to be played on any football ground within the jurisdiction of this Association. Clubs, officials, players or referees are not permitted to associate themselves in any way whatsoever with Ladies Football matches." The ban was lifted on 29 May 1970, and the sport experienced a revival in the 1990s.

== Domestic league ==
The pyramid in Wales consists of four tiers. The top two are run directly by the Welsh FA, whilst Tiers 3 and 4 are run by local FA's.

Starting in 2009, the top level of domestic football was the Welsh Premier Women's Football League. Below that, Tier 2 was split into Northern and Southern sections, the North Wales Women's Football League and South Wales Women's & Girls' League, respectively. Levels 3 and 4 were regionalised still further. The winner of the Premier League each season qualifies for the UEFA Women's Champions League. Three teams have been crowned champions since: Cardiff Met. Ladies (6 times), Swansea City Ladies (6 times) and Cardiff City (3 times). There is also a two-tier Under 19 Development system running parallel to the open age one.

In 2021, a full restructure of the league system was announced. The new league system would be see the Adran Premier become the top flight of women's football in Wales, with tier 2 remaining split into North and South sections, Adran North and Adran South respectively. Tiers 3 & 4 would remain regionalised and managed by the local FA.

Level	Total clubs	League(s)/Division(s)			
1	8	Adran Premier; 8 clubs			
2	16	Adran North; 8 clubs			Adran South; 8 clubs
3	32	North Wales Coast Women's Football League 7 clubs	North East Wales Women's Football League 8 clubs	Central Wales North Ladies League 5 clubs	SWWGL Women; SWWGL Women Combined Division 12 clubs

== Cup competitions ==
The FAW Women's Cup is the premier national cup competition which was founded in 1992. The current holders from the 23/24 season are Cardiff City after a 2-0 win in the final versus Wrexham.

A Premier League Cup was started in 2014. The restructure in 2021 saw the Premier League Cup be rebranded to the Adran Trophy; it is open for the 24 teams in the top two tiers of the Adran Leagues. The current holders from the 25/26 are Wrexham.

== Champions League participation ==
Season	Team	Round	Pld	W	D	L	GF	GA
2010–11	Swansea City Ladies F.C.	Qualifying round	3	1	0	2	2	12
2011–12	Swansea City Ladies F.C.	Qualifying round	3	1	0	2	4	10
2012–13	Cardiff Met WFC	Qualifying round	3	0	0	3	0	10
2013–14	Cardiff City F.C.	Qualifying round	3	0	0	3	0	6
2014–15	Cardiff Met WFC	Qualifying round	3	1	0	2	2	13
2015–16	Cardiff Met WFC	Qualifying round	3	0	0	3	2	15
2016–17	Cardiff Met WFC	Qualifying round	3	1	0	2	6	11
2017–18	Swansea City Ladies F.C.	Qualifying round	3	0	0	3	0	17
2018–19	Cardiff Met WFC	Qualifying round	3	0	1	2	6	10
2019–20	Cardiff Met WFC	Qualifying round	3	2	0	1	7	3
2020–21	Swansea City Ladies F.C.	Qualifying, round 1	1	0	0	1	0	3
2021–22	Swansea City Ladies F.C.	Qualifying, round 1	1	0	0	1	1	4
2022–23	Swansea City Ladies F.C.	Qualifying, round 1	1	0	0	1	0	2
2023–24	Cardiff City F.C.	Qualifying, round 1	2	0	0	2	0	5
2024–25	Cardiff City F.C.	Qualifying, round 1	2	0	0	2	0	9
2025–26	Cardiff City F.C.	Qualifying, round 1	1	0	0	1	0	4
2026–27	Wrexham A.F.C. Women	Qualifying, round 1	2	1	0	1	5	6

== National team ==
The national team are affiliated with both UEFA and FIFA. Founded in 1973, they first entered the FIFA Women's World Cup and UEFA Women's Championship in 1995. They are yet to qualify for the final stages of either tournament, their best effort being during the attempt to reach the 2019 World Cup, when they came second in their group. In June 2018 they reached an all time high position of 29 in the FIFA rankings, in contrast to their lowest position of 57 in 2006. There are also national teams for women and girls at age restricted levels (under 19, under 17 etc.). As of November 2021 current internationals Jess Fishlock and Helen Ward are the most capped and highest scoring senior national players in history. Wales qualified for their first major tournament Euro 2025.

== See also ==
- Football in Wales
- Wales women's national football team
- Bans of women's association football
