= 2024–25 FAW Women's Cup =

Tournament details
- Country: Wales
- Teams: 57

Final positions
- Champions: Cardiff City F.C.
- Runners-up: Wrexham AFC

The 2024–25 FAW Women's Cup (also known as Bute Energy Welsh Cup for sponsorship reasons) is the 30th edition of the FAW Women's Cup, the premier knock-out cup competition for women's association football teams in Wales.

== Format ==
The tournament is a single-elimination tournament, with 24 clubs in the qualifying round, and 29 joining in the first round proper.

== Qualifying round ==
Home team	Result	Away team
22 September 2024
North
Denbigh Town	2–5	Pwllheli
NFA	H–W	Berriew
Bangor	1–7	Llandudno
Amlwch Town	1–6	Y Rhyl
Llanfair United	0–2	Connah's Quay Nomads
Airbus UK Broughton	H–W	Caernarfon Town
Llangefni Town	6–2	Flint Town United
Kinmel Bay	3–3 (1–4 p)	Y Felinheli
Llanystumdwy	3–0	Northop Hall
South
Mumbles Rangers	A–W	Cwmbran Celtic
Llanelli Town	12–0	Morriston Town
Johnstown	4–0	Aberystwyth University
Talycopa	12–0	Aberaman
Wattsville	A–W	Penydarren
Abertillery Belles	1–15	Penclawdd
Llantwit Fardre	0–7	Cambrian United
Rogerstone	0–20	Penybont
Pontarodulais Town	2–5	Taffs Well
Croesyceiliog	A–W	Cascade YC
Caldicot Town	8–1	North Cardiff Cosmos
AFC Llwydcoed	0–7	Swansea University
Pontypridd United	9–1	Ammanford
Cardiff Wanderers	H–W	Drefach
Carmarthen Town	4–2	Trefelin

== First round ==
Home team	Result	Away team
20 October 2024
North
Y Felinheli	4–4 (4–3 p)	Llangefni Town
Y Rhyl 1879	0–8	Aberystwyth
Llanystumdwy	0–11	Wrexham
Llandudno	3–3 (5–3 p)	Connah's Ouay Nomads
NFA	3–1	Airbus UK Broughton
Pwllheli	0–6	The New Saints
South
Cwmbran Celtic	1–4	Cascade YC
Penclawdd	2–6	Cardiff City
Penydarren	2–2 (4–2 p)	Llanelli Town
Cardiff Wanderers	1–12	Caldicot Town
Swansea University	1–5	Carmarthen Town
Cambrian United	2–5	Johnstown
Pontypridd United	1–0	Penybont
Talycopa	0–11	Swansea City
Cardiff Met	0–5	Barry Town United
Taffs Well	0–5	Briton Ferry Llansawel

== Second round ==
Home team	Result	Away team
17 November 2024
North
Y Felinheli	0–10	Wrexham
Llandudno	0–6	The New Saints
NFA	0–8	Aberystwyth
South
Cardiff City	2–1	Cascade YC
Johnstown	0–3	Pontypridd United
Caldicot Town	2–2 (2–4 p)	Barry Town United
Penydarren	1–11	Briton Ferry Llansawel
Carmarthen Town	0–3	Swansea City

== Quarter-finals ==
16 February 2025
14:00 GMT

Briton Ferry Llansawel	2–2 (a.e.t.)	The New Saints
Richardson 62'; Crofts 88'	Report	Buckland 20'; Havard 63'
Penalties
Powell (penalty scored); Kearle (penalty scored); Denscombe (penalty missed); Kett-White (penalty missed)	2–4	(penalty scored) Lewis; (penalty scored) Havard; (penalty scored) Jones; (penalty scored) Phillips

Old Road Welfare Ground
Referee: Joshua Lewis Howells
16 February 2025
14:00 GMT

Wrexham	5–0	Swansea City
Iddenden 29' 64'; Suckley 42' (pen.); Fuller 53'; Hughes 90+4'	Report

The Rock, Rhosymedre
Referee: John Jones
16 February 2025
14:00 GMT

Aberystwyth Town	0–2	Pontypridd United
	Report	Fenton 38' 55'

Park Avenue, Aberystwyth
Referee: Richard Lee Wright
16 February 2025
14:00 GMT

Cardiff City	4–0	Barry Town United
Barry 11'; Kehoe 64'; Olden 69'; Curnock 83'	Report

Cardiff International Sports Stadium
Referee: Charlotte Carpenter

== Semi-finals ==
16 March 2025
14:00 GMT

Wrexham	4–0	Pontypridd United
Iddenden 5' 55'; Jones 24' (o.g.); Cairns 29'	Report

Latham Park, Newtown, Wales
Referee: James Walker
16 March 2025
16:30 GMT

The New Saints	0–1	Cardiff City
	Report	Barry 63'

Park Avenue, Aberystwyth, Aberystwyth, Wales
Referee: Benjamin Hyla Allan Williams

== Final ==
27 April 2025
17:15 BST

Wrexham	1–3	Cardiff City
Iddenden 31' (pen.)	Report	Billingham 6'; Evans 29'; Barry 74'

Rodney Parade, Newport, Wales
Referee: Charlotte Carpenter
