= 2009–10 Welsh Premier Women's League =

Welsh Premier Women's League
- Season: 2009–10
- Champions: Swansea City Ladies
- Relegated: none
- UEFA Women's Champions League: Swansea City Ladies
- Matches: 25
- Goals: 101 (4.04 per match)

The 2009–10 Welsh Premier League was the first season of the Welsh Premier Women's League, Wales' premier football league.

The first season was special, as there was no relegation. Swansea City Ladies won every match of the season, including a 4–0 victory in the final against Caernarfon Town, and qualified for the 2010–11 UEFA Women's Champions League.

== Northern conference ==
Locations of teams in the 2010–11 Premier League

=== Final standings ===
Pos	Team	Pld	W	D	L	GF	GA	GD	Pts	Qualification
1	Caernarfon Town Ladies	6	4	1	1	9	5	+4	13	Participant of Final
2	Llanidloes Ladies	6	4	0	2	12	7	+5	12	
3	Aberystwyth Town Ladies	6	2	2	2	8	7	+1	8	
4	Wrexham Ladies	6	0	1	5	7	17	−10	1	

=== Results ===
Home \ Away	CAE	LLA	ABE	WRE
Caernarfon Town Ladies		2–1	1–1	2–0
Llanidloes Ladies	2–1		1–0	4–1
Aberystwyth Town Ladies	0–1	2–0		2–2
Wrexham Ladies	1–2	1–4	2–3	

Legend: Blue = home team win; Yellow = draw; Red = away team win.

== Southern conference ==
=== Final standings ===
Pos	Team	Pld	W	D	L	GF	GA	GD	Pts	Qualification
1	Swansea City Ladies	6	6	0	0	32	1	+31	18	Participant of Final
2	UWIC Ladies	6	4	0	2	14	8	+6	12	
3	Manorbier Ladies	6	1	0	5	10	20	−10	3	
4	Newcastle Emlyn Ladies	6	1	0	5	5	32	−27	3	

=== Results ===
Home \ Away	SWA	UWI	MAN	NEW
Swansea City Ladies		2–0	8–0	6–0
UWIC Ladies	0–3		3–1	4–0
Manorbier Ladies	0–2	2–3		6–0
Newcastle Emlyn Ladies	1–11	0–4	4–1	

Legend: Blue = home team win; Yellow = draw; Red = away team win.

== Final ==
9 May 2010

Swansea City Ladies	4–0	Caernarfon Town
Sarah Adams 27'; Laura May Walkley 29', 84', 90+3'

Haverfordwest
Referee: Kevin Morgan
