= 2020–21 Welsh Premier Women's League =

Welsh Premier Women's Football League
- Season: 2020–21

The 2020–21 Welsh Premier Women's League, also known as Orchard Welsh Premier Women's League due to sponsorship reasons, is the twelfth season of the Women's Welsh Premier League, the top level women's football league in Wales. The season began on 27 September 2020 with the Cardiff City versus Swansea City being the first women's domestic match in Wales to be televised live.

The league was suspended from 23 October 2020 until 9 November 2020 because of a national lockdown due to the COVID-19 pandemic. The league was rebranded the following season to the Adran Premier.

== Standings ==
Pos	Team	Pld	W	D	L	GF	GA	GD	Pts	Qualification or relegation
1	Swansea City (C)	16	13	3	0	53	1	+52	42	Qualification for the Champions League first round
2	Cardiff Metropolitan	16	13	2	1	60	8	+52	41	
3	Cardiff City	16	10	2	4	39	27	+12	32	
4	Abergavenny Women	16	7	4	5	31	19	+12	25	
5	Port Talbot Town	16	7	4	5	28	30	−2	25	
6	Cyncoed Ladies	16	4	4	8	17	34	−17	16	
7	Briton Ferry Llansawel Ladies	16	3	2	11	14	48	−34	11	
8	Cascade	16	2	1	13	9	53	−44	7	
9	Aberystwyth Town	16	1	2	13	6	37	−31	5	

Source: Soccerway
Rules for classification: 1) Points; 2) Goal difference; 3) Number of goals scored
(C) Champions
