= 2013–14 Welsh Women's Cup =

2013–14 FAW Women's Cup
The Welsh Women's Cup

Tournament details
- Country: Wales
- Teams: 25

Final positions
- Champions: Cardiff Met
- Runner-up: Swansea City

The 2013–14 FAW Women's Cup was the 22nd season of Wales' national association football knock-out competition. It saw 25 clubs apply for entry, three less than previous season. Cardiff City Ladies were the defending champions.

Cardiff Met. Ladies F.C. won the title, after finishing runner-up three times in the last four years.

== Format ==
Play is a straight knock-out. First two rounds are drawn on a regional basis. Seven teams receive a bye to the second round.

== Results ==
=== First round ===
Played on 20 October 2013. Drawn into North and South groups. PILCS, Cardiff Met, Cardiff City, Wrexham, Port Talbot, Swansea City and Caernarfon Town received a bye to the second round.

North
Kinmel Bay Girls	3–3 aet (5–6 p)	Aberystwyth Town Ladies
Llanidloes Ladies	2–3	Llandudno Junction Ladies
Northop Hall Girls	3–2	Denbigh Town Ladies FC
Prestatyn Ladies & Girls	0–2	Llanfair United Ladies
South
Briton Ferry Llansawel	17–0	Merthyr Town Ladies FC
Caerphilly Castle Ladies & Girls	w/o	Garden Village Ladies FC
Camrose	0–13	Newcastle Emlyn Ladies
Cwmbran Celtic Ladies FC	9–0	Pontardawe Town Ladies FC
Dafen Welfare Ladies FC	2–9	Cyncoed Ladies

=== Second round ===
Played on 17 November 2013, again drawn into North and South groups.

North
Aberystwyth Town Ladies	1–2	Wrexham Ladies
Llandudno Junction Ladies	1–2	Caernarfon Town Ladies
Llanfair United Ladies	4–2	Northop Hall Girls
South
Briton Ferry Llansawel	0–9	Swansea City Ladies
Cardiff City FC Women	6–0	Port Talbot Town Ladies
Cwmbran Celtic Ladies FC	10–1	Garden Village Ladies FC
Newcastle Emlyn Ladies	0–5	Cardiff Metropolitan Ladies
PILCS Ladies FC	4–1	Cyncoed Ladies

=== Quarter final ===
Played on 16 February 2014. First open draw of the Cup.

Caernarfon Town Ladies	6–0	Llanfair United Ladies
Cardiff City FC Women	0–5	Cardiff Metropolitan Ladies	at Cardiff Met
Cwmbran Celtic Ladies FC	0–2 aet	PILCS Ladies FC
Swansea City Ladies	3–1	Wrexham Ladies

=== Semi final ===
Played on 16 March 2014. PILCS lost a 2–0 lead against Cardiff Met.

Cardiff Metropolitan Ladies	3–2 aet	PILCS Ladies FC	at Newtown AFC
Swansea City Ladies	3–0	Caernarfon Town Ladies	at Taffs Well FC

=== Final ===
The final is played by two former finalists. Swansea are the 2011 champions, while Cardiff Met. has lost three finals between 2010 and 2013.

13 April 2014
14:00

Cardiff Metropolitan Ladies	4–0	Swansea City Ladies
Emily Brown; Emily Brown; Chloe O'Connor; Emily Brown	Report

Stebonheath Park, Llanelli
