= Chloe Chivers =

Welsh footballer (born 1999)

Personal information
- Date of birth: 29 April 1999 (age 27)
- Place of birth: Wales,
- Position: Forward

Team information
- Current team: Swansea City

Senior career*
| Years | Team | Apps | (Gls) |
| 2017-2018 | Oxford United | 16 | (5) |
| 2018-2019 | Cardiff Met. | 0 | (0) |
| 2019- | Swansea City | 0 | (0) |

International career^{‡}
- Wales
- * Club domestic league appearances and goals as of 19:50, 30 August 2019 (UTC) ‡ National team caps and goals as of 19:50, 30 August 2019 (UTC)

Chloe Chivers (born 29 April 1999) is a Welsh footballer who plays as a forward for Swansea City in the Welsh Premier Women's Football League and has appeared for the Wales women's national team.

== Career ==
Chivers has been capped for the Wales national team, appearing for the team during the 2019 FIFA Women's World Cup qualifying cycle.
