= Lili Jones =

Welsh footballer

Personal information
- Date of birth: 26 September 2005 (age 21)
- Place of birth: Wrexham, Wales
- Position: Midfielder

Team information
- Current team: Wrexham
- Number: 21

Youth career
- 2019–2021: Everton
- 2021–2022: Wrexham

Senior career*
Years	Team	Apps	(Gls)
2021–	Wrexham	50	(8)

International career^{‡}
2021	Wales U17	1	(0)
- * Club domestic league appearances and goals as of 22:40, 1 July 2024 (UTC) ‡ National team caps and goals as of 22:40, 1 July 2024 (UTC)

Lili Mai Jones (born 26 September 2005) is a Welsh footballer who plays for Wrexham in the Adran Premier League.

== Career ==
She played for Everton's Under 16 Youth Women's team in the FA Girls' England Talent Pathway League from 2019 to 2021.

Jones returned to Wrexham football club when she was 15 and made her debut for the senior team in September 2021, where she scored two goals in this game.

== Personal life ==
Since returning to Wrexham in 2021, Jones has had to work multiple jobs alongside her footballing career in order to make a living. As shown on the docuseries Welcome to Wrexham, Jones works in cafes in the towns washing dishes on her rest days from football. Jones' father died in April 2021.

At the 2025 Wrexham National Eisteddfod she was inducted by the Gorsedd Cymru as an Honorary Druid. Her Gorsedd name is Lili ferch Gareth ('Lili daughter of Gareth') in honour of her father.

== Career statistics ==
=== Club ===
As of match played 2 March 2025

Appearances and goals by club, season and competition
Club	Season	League			Adran Trophy		Welsh Cup		NEWFA Challenge Cup		Other		Total	
Club	Season	Division	Apps	Goals	Apps	Goals	Apps	Goals	Apps	Goals	Apps	Goals	Apps	Goals
Wrexham	2021–22	Adran North	7	2	1	0	—		1	0	—		9	2
Wrexham	2022–23	Adran North	10	2	3	1	2	0	1	0	1 (Note: Appearances in Adran North promotion play-offs)	0	17	3
Wrexham	2023–24	Adran Premier	20	2	1	0	4	1	—		—		25	3
Wrexham	2024–25	Adran Premier	13	2	2	1	1	0	—		—		16	3
Total			50	8	7	2	7	1	2	0	1	0	67	11
Career total			50	8	7	2	7	1	2	0	1	0	67	11
