= Natasha Thomas (footballer) =

Jamaican footballer

Personal information
- Full name: Natasha Viola Thomas
- Date of birth: 19 December 1995 (age 30)
- Place of birth: England
- Position: Forward

Team information
- Current team: Wrexham

Youth career
- Waveney

Senior career*
| Years | Team | Apps | (Gls) |
- Lowestoft Town
| 2015–2026 | Ipswich Town | 258 | (174) |
| 2026– | Wrexham | 2 | (1) |

International career^{‡}
| 2024– | Jamaica | 6 | (3) |
- * Club domestic league appearances and goals as of 00:22, 23 April 2026 (UTC) ‡ National team caps and goals as of 08:29, 3 March 2026 (UTC+1)

Natasha Viola Thomas (born 19 December 1995) is a footballer who plays as a forward for Adran Premier club Wrexham. Born in England, she plays for the Jamaica national team.

== Club career ==
Thomas previously played for Waveney and Lowestoft Town, joining Ipswich in 2015, at the age of 19. She also works as a gym instructor. She is the Ipswich Town record appearance maker and goal scorer.

In May 2026, Thomas departed the club after 11 years.On 3 July, it was announced that Thomas signed with Adran Premier club Wrexham.

== International career ==
Thomas received a call for Jamaica in 2024. She made her international debut on 25 October 2024, coming on as a 70th minute substitution against France, becoming Ipswich Town's first full international.
