= Emily Allen =

Welsh footballer (born 1992)

Personal information
- Date of birth: 29 January 1992 (age 34)
- Place of birth: Whitehaven, Cumbria, England
- Positions: Midfielder; forward

Team information
- Current team: Oxford United
- Number: 7

Youth career
- Swindon Town

Senior career*
Years	Team	Apps	(Gls)
	Bristol Academy	0	(0)
2011–2016	Cardiff Met. Ladies	19	(15)
2017–2021	Oxford United	39	(32)
2021–	Cardiff Met. Ladies	13	(21)
- * Club domestic league appearances and goals as of 19:00, 4 September 2021 (UTC)

Emily Allen (born 29 January 1992) is a Welsh footballer born in Whitehaven, Cumbria, England. She played for FA Women's National League South team Oxford United as a midfielder and striker until 2021. In 2021 she returned to Cardiff Met.

== Career ==
Allen started playing football in Ashton Keynes, Wiltshire when she was 5 and coached by her father. She later moved to Swindon Town Ladies followed by Swindon Badgers before joining Cirencester Town F.C. in Gloucestershire. In 2008, when she turned 16, Allen signed a contract with FA Women's Premier League National Division team Bristol Academy W.F.C. as she was unable to sign a contract until then. In 2010, she was part of the Filton Academy team that reached the final of the English Schools Cup when she was 18. Later in the year, Allen made her first team debut for Bristol Academy coming on as a substitute against Everton Ladies in the FA Women's Premier League National Division. Allen then joined Cardiff Met. Ladies in 2011. While playing for Cardiff, in 2013, Allen set a Welsh Premier Women's Football League record by scoring 15 goals in one game against Caerphilly Castle F.C. In 2015, Allen played for Cardiff Met. Ladies in the UEFA Women's Champions League and scored the team's only goal in the campaign. She was later named as the team captain, and also took the team's penalty kicks. In 2021 she rejoined Cardiff Met.

== Personal life ==
As well as playing football, during her youth Allen played cricket for the youth team of Gloucestershire County Cricket Club. Allen studied for a National Diploma in Sports Development at Filton College, South Gloucestershire and Stroud College in Bristol. Allen has now completed BSc in Sports Coaching.
