= Rebecca Sawiuk =

English professional football coach

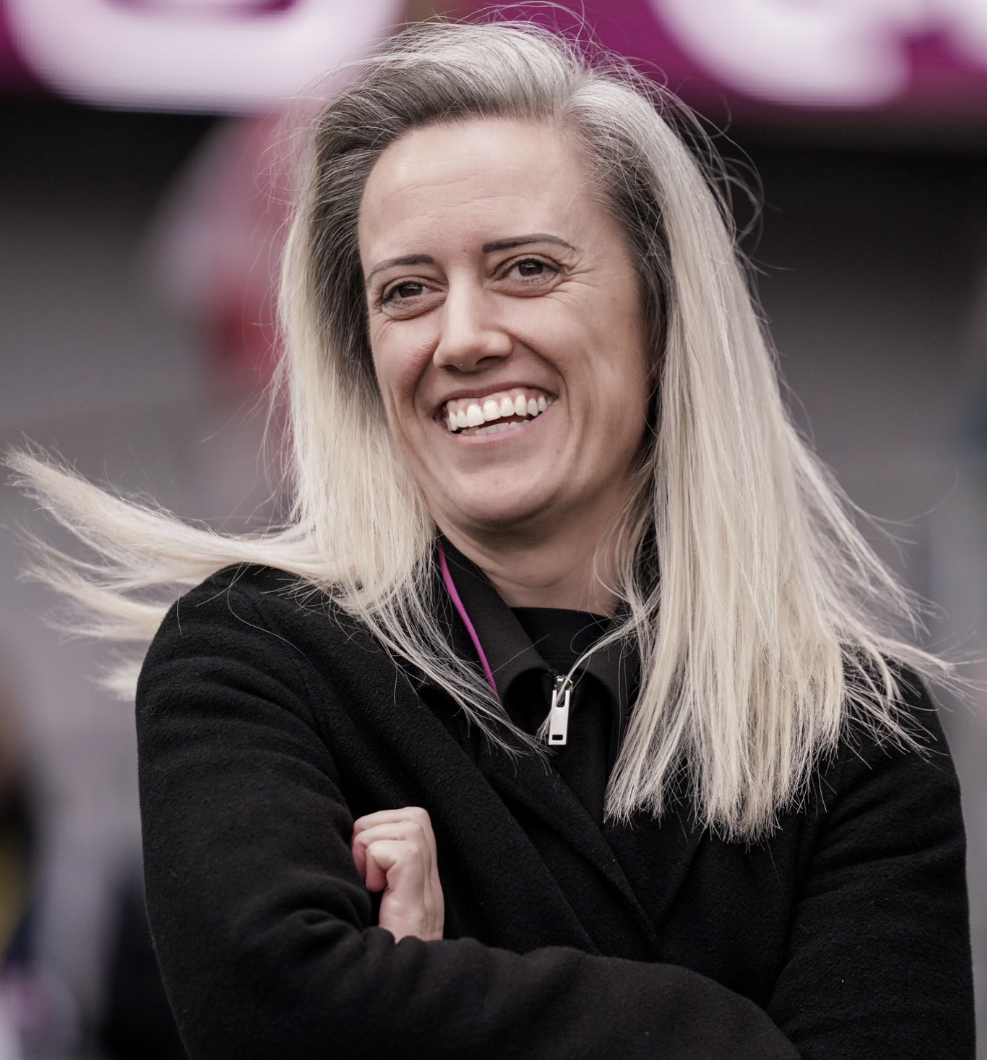

Personal information
- Date of birth: 20 February 1989 (age 37)
- Place of birth: Cambridge, England

Rebecca Sawiuk (born 20 February 1989) is an English professional football coach and manager. She previously held the Head Coach role at Burnley Women in the FA Women's National League North 23–25. She previously served as the Director of Football for Loughborough University, held both Head Coach and Assistant Coach roles in the Barclays Women's Super League 2 and spent four seasons coaching in the Youth Development Phase at Watford FC Academy (boys). Rebecca's research portfolio of published work focuses on the area of sports coaching and coach education.

== Career history ==
=== Early career ===
Rebecca completed her UEFA A Licence in 2014. Sawiuk studied a sports coaching degree at Manchester Metropolitan University between 09 and 2014. During this time, she worked with Crewe Alexandra performance pathway u14, u11 and moved to Stoke City following the FA's decision to close Crewe. Here she coached the u13, u15 age groups which included, Hannah Hampton. In 2013–2015, an opportunity to work within the National system followed, Rebecca held the role of u15s Assistant Coach on the national talent camps which helped to develop the best young players in the country. Her work for the FA included holding the role of u17s Head Coach on the SW performance pathway where she coached the u17s age group whilst supporting with the research process.

=== Women's Super League 2 ===
Rebecca has held coaching roles for London Bees, Millwall Women (now London City Lionesses) and Oxford Women who all competed in the Barclays WSL2. In 2014-2015 Sawiuk was Assistant Coach at London Bees following the departure of Head Coach Donati, subsequently she was appointed interim Head Coach for the Bees. Sawiuk was in the dugout for the first ever WSL2 match an (A) 0–3 win at Oxford. In 2016 she was appointed as the Manager of Millwall and succeeded Dan Milnar, during this time she oversaw 1-1, 2-2 results against Everton, a 3 -1 win against Watford, a 5–3 win against Oxford and a 1–1 draw with eventual champions Yeovil. Rebecca's Millwall side also fell to a 2–0 away loss in the FA Cup to WSL1 side Reading. After a 6-month stint, she departed to focus on a different career opportunity. In 2017-2019 Rebecca held the role of Technical Director at Oxford United where she oversaw the programme from u9-u21. She additionally supported Andy Cook as a first team coach following a departure to his backroom team for the 18–19 season. During this time the u16s reached the final 4 of the FA Youth Cup and lost 0–3 to Arsenal in the semifinal, the furthest an Oxford team had ever reached.

=== Watford FC Academy ===
Sawiuk spent 4 seasons (18–22) coaching at Watford Academy and was appointed by Head of Football Barry Quin. She held her role under a variety of different Academy Managers and Head of Coaching staff, Jimmy Gilligan, Richard Johnson, Richard Thomas and Darren Searle. Rebecca mainly worked in the YDP phase but assisted throughout the pathway. She is one of only a few female coaches to have held roles in a male football Academy.

=== Director of Football Loughborough ===
Rebecca was appointed Director of Football at Loughborough University in April 2022, following her departure from the University of Hertfordshire. Sawiuk oversaw a successful spell for the men and women's performance football offer, men and women's futsal and all BUCS and rec football on campus. Loughborough University is the best University in the world for sports-related subjects and has been for 9 years in a row and has won the BUCS national competition for 43 years running. Loughborough is renowned for its high-performance environment and is home to many of the best athletes in the UK. During Rebecca's time at Loughborough, she supported the men's performance side with their groundbreaking promotion into Step 4 of the non-league pyramid, with support from the FA and the non-league board to break through the historical red tape. She led the growth and development of the Loughborough Lighting football programme and appointed current Head Coach Charles Baxter. Alongside this role Rebecca held the title of Head Coach of the English Universities Women's programme from 2019 to 2023.

=== Burnley Women ===
Sawiuk joined Burnley as Head Coach following the departure of Jay Bradford to Rangers in June 2023. Rebecca led Burnley to their highest ever finish in the Women's FA National League North 23–24. In the 23–24 season Burnley reached the 4th round of the FA Cup competition and were drawn against Birmingham City Women who at the time the game was played sat 1st in the WSL2. Burnley lost the game 1-3 AET. Burnley finished the FA Cup competition as the highest scorers with 23 goals. She departed the club in 2025.

== Managerial statistics ==
TEAM	FROM	TO	Record							
TEAM	FROM	TO	P	W	D	L	GF	GA	GD	Win %
Burnley Women	June 2023	March 2025	57	41	3	13	197	47	150	71%

== TV appearances ==
Rebecca was recruited for the Ultimate Goal TV show. Sawiuk was part of Racheal Brown-Finnis, Eni Aluko, Rosie Kmita and Molly Kmita coaching support team. The show ran for 2 seasons, each with 6 episodes.

== Personal life ==
Born in Cambridge, she attended the Chesterton Community College and moved onto Long Road Sixth Form College. Rebecca comes from a family with a rich football history associated with Cambridge United. Her grandad Arthur Morgan played in goal for Cambridge United in 1947-1955 and his brother Jack Morgan first dropped the Cambridge United anthem 'got a lovely bunch of coconuts' at the Abbey.

=== Research profile ===
Sawiuk holds a MSc in Sports Coaching (MMU), League Manager Diploma (Liverpool Hope) and a PGcert in Teaching (University of Hertfordshire). Rebecca is a published academic in the field of sports coaching; specifically mentoring, coach education, women's football and gender.
