= North Wales Women's Football League =

- Founded: 2003
- Folded: 2025
- Country: Wales
- Divisions: 2
- Number of clubs: 14
- Level on pyramid: 3
- Promotion to: Adran North
- Last champions: Pwllheli (2024–25)

The North Wales Women's Football League was a football league in North Wales. The league was formed in 2003. It was at the third tier of the league pyramid, offering promotion to the Adran North. After the 2024–25 season it was split into two new leagues, the North Wales Coast Women's Football League and the North East Wales Women's Football League, though in August 2025 it was confirmed that the North East Wales League was absorbed into the new Central Wales North Women's League.

== Member clubs for 2024–25 season ==
=== East Division ===
- Airbus UK Broughton
- Berriew
- Coedpoeth United
- Denbigh Town
- Henllan
- Northop Hall
- Welshpool Town

=== West Division ===
- Amlwch Town
- Caernarfon Town
- Kinmel Bay
- Llangefni Town
- Llanystumdwy
- Pwllheli
- Trearddur Bay

== Champions ==
- 2003–04:
- 2004–05:
- 2005–06: Colwyn Bay
- 2006–07: Colwyn Bay
- 2007–08: NEWI Wrexham
- 2008–09: Caernarfon Town
- 2009–10: Caernarfon Town
- 2010–11: Caernarfon Town
- 2011–12: Wrexham
- 2012–13: Kinmel Bay
- 2013–14: Prestatyn Town
- 2014–15: Denbigh Town
- 2015–16: GAP Northop Hall
- 2016–17: Caernarfon Town
- 2017–18: Northop Hall
- 2018–19: Bethel and Llanfair United (shared)
- 2019–20: Llanfair United
- 2020–21: cancelled due to COVID-19 pandemic
- 2021–22: Rhyl 1879
- 2022–23: Bangor 1876
- 2023–24: Pwllheli
- 2024–25: Pwllheli
