= Adran Premier =

Female association football league in Wales

- Founded: 2009
- Country: Wales
- Other club from: England (1 team)
- Confederation: UEFA
- Number of clubs: 8
- Level on pyramid: 1
- Relegation to: Adran North; Adran South
- Domestic cup: FAW Women's Cup
- League cup: Adran Trophy
- International cup: UEFA Women's Champions League
- Current champions: Wrexham (1st title)
- Most championships: Cardiff Met. (6 titles); Swansea City (6 titles)
- Website: adranleagues.cymru/adran-premier
- Current: 2026–27

The Adran Premier (English: Premier Division, formerly the Welsh Premier Women's League), currently known for sponsorship reasons as Genero Adran Premier, is the highest level of league competition for women's football in Wales. Established in 2009, it is organised by the Adran Leagues, the women's division of the Football Association of Wales, and features four semi-professional teams out of eight. As of 2024, the league is ranked 48th overall by the UEFA Women's association club coefficients.

== History ==
In its first three seasons, the league was divided into two Conferences that played a double round robin, with the winner of both contesting a final for the championship. The first season featured no relegation, from the 2010–11 season onwards, the last placed team in each conference got relegated.

Since 2012–13 the league is played in one group only. In 2015–16 two teams were relegated. The eight clubs who formed the League were Aberystwyth Town Ladies, Caernarfon Town Ladies, Llanidloes Ladies, Manorbier Ladies, Newcastle Emlyn Ladies, Swansea City Ladies, UWIC Ladies and Wrexham Women.

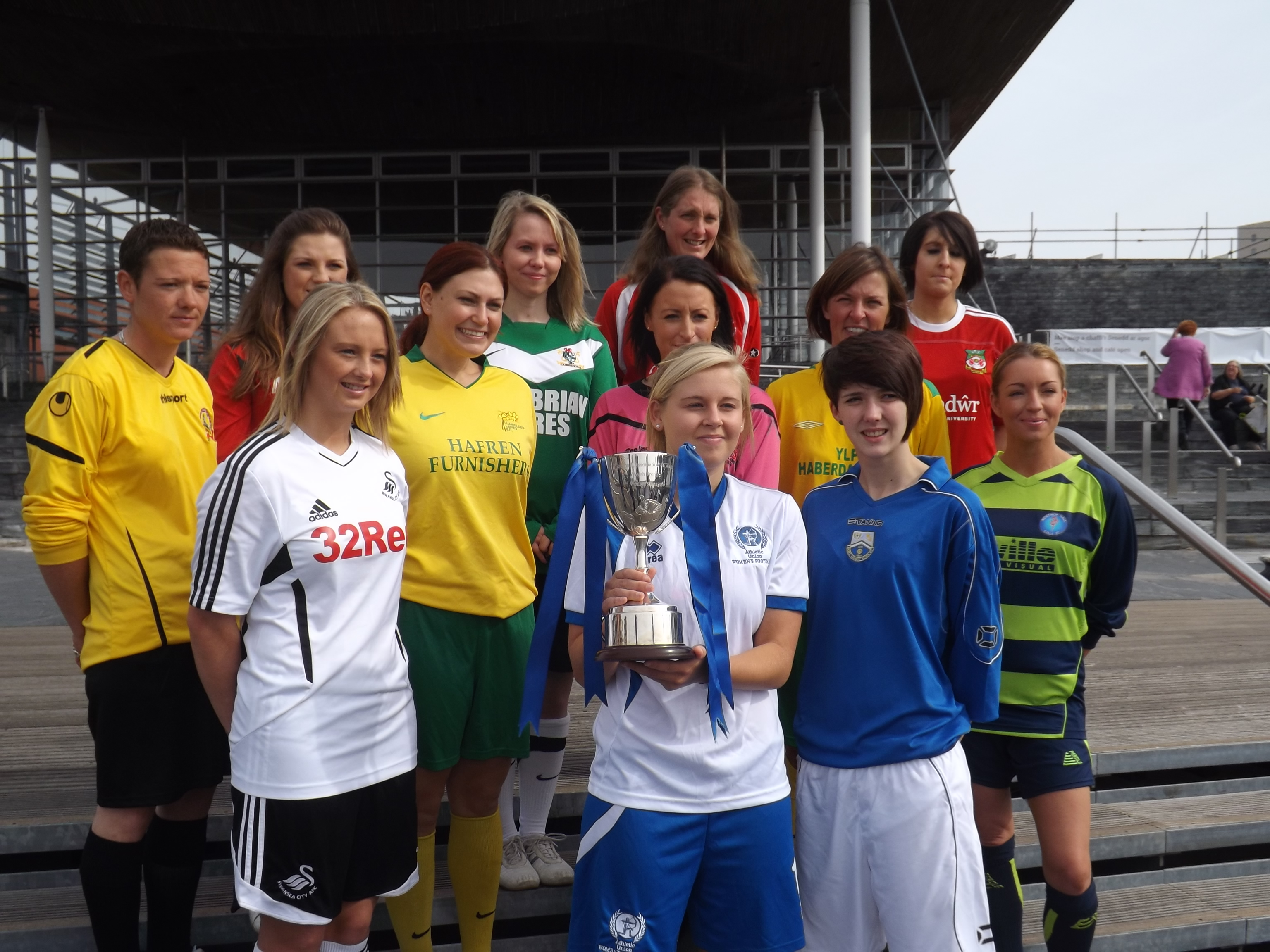
2012 Season Launch

The league was increased to five teams per Conference in 2010–11, with Caerphilly Castle Ladies and Trefelin Ladies joining the South and Llandudno Junction Ladies joining the North. Manorbier Ladies ceased playing activities after their inaugural season.

Llandudno Junction's stay in the league lasted just one season before they were relegated; they were replaced by Northop Hall Girls.

In May 2021, the Football Association of Wales announced a restructuring of the league, including cutting the number of teams from nine to eight, splitting the second tier into northern and southern conferences, and the introduction of a U19 development league. The restructuring saw Abergavenny Women's FC, Caerphilly Castle Ladies and Briton Ferry Llansawel Ladies demoted to the second tier, while Barry Town United Ladies FC and The New Saints joined the Premier League. The choice of top-tier teams in the restructuring was met with a significant amount of criticism, as Abergavenny had finished within the top four during the 2020–21 season and The New Saints did not have a complete senior women's side. FAW head of women's football Lowri Roberts stood by their decision, adding that "we have to be able to compete with Tier 3 in England. The WSL and Championship in England are professional and semi-professional and we’re a long way off that. It’s unlikely we’ll get to a professional level."

=== Rebranding ===
In August 2021, the league also announced a rebranding initiative, changing the name from "Welsh Premier Women's League" to "Adran Premier", adopting the Welsh word adran (division). For sponsorship reasons it is named the "Genero Adran Premier" (sponsored by Welsh firm Genero). The second tier conferences were likewise renamed Adran North and Adran South. The rebranding was in part an effort to remove the word "Women's" from the league name to achieve better parity with the men's game. The league cup was likewise rebranded to the Adran Trophy.

== Competition format ==
The club with the highest number of points at the end of the season are the League Champions. In the event of two or more clubs having the same number of points the League winners will be decided by the difference between goals scored and goals against. In the event of more than one club having the same goal difference, the club that has scored the highest number of goals will be the Champions.

=== Promotion and relegation ===
One club may be promoted to the Adran Premier, from Adran North or from Adran South, and the same number relegated out of the first tier. To determine which conference sees a club promoted, the top club from each of the two leagues that meets the other requirements for being in the Premier compete in a playoff.

=== European qualification ===
UEFA Women's association club coefficients 2024–25
| Rank | Association | Coefficient |
|---|---|---|
| 47 | Moldova | 5.500 |
| 48 | Wales | 5.000 |
| 48 | Faroe Islands | 5.000 |

UEFA grants European places to the Football Association of Wales, determined by Wales' position in the UEFA country coefficient rankings. The Welsh Football Association in turn allocates a number of these European places to the final Welsh Premier Women's League positions. As of 2024, Wales was ranked 48th in Europe – granting them one placement in the UEFA Women's Champions League qualifying rounds.

== Clubs ==
=== 2026–27 ===
Locations of teams in the 2026–25 Adran Premier

| Club | City | Ground | Capacity |
|---|---|---|---|
| Aberystwyth Town | Aberystwyth | Park Avenue | 5,000 |
| Barry Town United | Barry | Jenner Park Stadium | 2,650 |
| Briton Ferry Llansawel A.F.C. Ladies | Briton Ferry | Old Road Ground | 2,000 |
| Cardiff City | Cardiff | Cardiff International Sports Stadium | 4,953 |
| Cardiff Met | Cardiff | Cyncoed Stadium | 1,620 |
| Swansea City | Neath | Llandarcy Academy of Sport | 2,000 |
| The New Saints FC | Oswestry | Park Hall | 3,000 |
| Wrexham | Wrexham | The Rock | 3,000 |

== List of champions ==
In the first three seasons, a final between the north and south division winners determined the champion.

| Season | Champion | Runners-up | Third place | Ref |
|---|---|---|---|---|
as the Welsh Premier Women's League
| 2009–10 | Swansea City | Caernarfon Town | N/a (Final: 4–0) | |
| 2010–11 | Swansea City | Caernarfon Town | N/a (Final: 3–1) | |
| 2011–12 | Cardiff Met | Wrexham | N/a (Final: 3–0) | |
| 2012–13 | Cardiff City | Cardiff Met | Wrexham | |
| 2013–14 | Cardiff Met | Abergavenny Town | Cardiff City | |
| 2014–15 | Cardiff Met | Swansea City | Abergavenny Town | |
| 2015–16 | Cardiff Met | Swansea City | Cardiff City | |
| 2016–17 | Swansea City | Cardiff Met | Cardiff City | |
| 2017–18 | Cardiff Met | Swansea City | Abergavenny Town | |
| 2018–19 | Cardiff Met | Swansea City | Cardiff City | |
| 2019–20 | Swansea City | Cardiff Met | Cardiff City | |
| 2020–21 | Swansea City | Cardiff Met | Cardiff City | |
as the Adran Premier
| 2021–22 | Swansea City | Cardiff Met | Cardiff City | |
| 2022–23 | Cardiff City | Swansea City | Cardiff Met | |
| 2023–24 | Cardiff City | Swansea City | Wrexham | |
| 2024–25 | Cardiff City | Briton Ferry Llansawel | The New Saints | |
| 2025–26 | Wrexham | Cardiff City | Swansea City | |

| Titles | Team |
|---|---|
| 6 | Cardiff Met |
| 6 | Swansea City |
| 4 | Cardiff City |
| 1 | Wrexham |

== See also ==
- Women's football in Wales
