= Northop Hall Girls F.C. =

Association football club in Wales

Coordinates: 53.172796°N 3.143388°W

NHGFC
- Full name: Northop Hall Girls FC
- Founded: 2008
- Ground: The Pavilion
- League
- Website: http://www.northophallgirlsfc.co.uk/
Home colours

Northop Hall Girls FC is a girls only football club based in Northop Hall, Flintshire in North Wales. The club's senior women's team joined the top level Welsh Premier League in 2011–12. The club withdrew from the league midway in the 2013/14 season because of a lack of players, but are now playing in the North Wales league again.

== History ==
Northop Hall Girls FC was formed in 2008. Northop Hall Girls FC play in the North Wales Girls Football League and play their matches along the North Wales Coast, from Aston Park to Pwllheli.

== Achievements ==
The team has won the Tesco Cup and both league and cup honours. It is one of the only "female only" Football Clubs in Wales that provide a continuous pathway in Football where a seven-year-old can progress all the way through to Ladies Open Age.

For season 2015–16 the club has teams at the following age groups: U8, U10, U11, U12, U14, U16 and Ladies open age. Over 100 girls and ladies are members of the club.

== Honours ==
- North Wales Girls League
  - u10 cup runners up 2008–09, 2013–14
  - u13 League Winners 2008–09
  - u14 North Wales Coast u14 cup winners 2008–09
  - u15 league runners up 2008–09
  - u15 cup runners up 2008–9
  - u17 league runners up 2008–09
  - u17 cup runners up 2008–09
  - u10 Shield winners 2009–10
  - u16 League winners 2009–10
  - u16 League winners 2009–10
  - u16 FAW u16 girls cup runners up 2009–10
  - u18 League winners 2009–10
  - u18 Cup winners 2009–10
  - Ladies cup runners up 2009–10
