= Rosie Hughes =

Welsh footballer

Personal information
- Date of birth: 12 October 1995 (age 31)
- Place of birth: Colwyn Bay, Wales
- Position: Forward

Team information
- Current team: Connah's Quay Nomads
- Number: 10

Youth career
- 2008–2010: Everton F.C. (women)
- 2010–2013: Kimmel Bay F.C.

Senior career*
Years	Team	Apps	(Gls)
2015?–2018	Llandudno	12	(11+)
2018–2020	Denbigh	9+	(18+)
2021–2026	Wrexham	85	(136)
2026	Connah's Quay Nomads	7	(8)
- * Club domestic league appearances and goals

Rosie Hughes is a Welsh footballer who plays for Connah's Quay Nomads. She's previously played for Wrexham in the Adran Premier League, Llandudno and Denbigh Town. She was the top goalscorer for Llandudno in the league for three years, and the top scorer in the Adran North league from 2021 to 2023.

== Club career ==
Hughes is from Colwyn Bay, and started playing for her first official football team when she joined Colwyn Bay girls and the age of only 9. She then after Colwyn Bay folded, joined Mochdre, and at approx 12 years old, without her mother's guidance found herself following her teammates to play for the youth team. of Kinmel Kinmel Bay U16, making it to the Welsh Cup final with them in the 2011 season and winning the Cup in the 2012 season.

She later joined the Llandudno Ladies, playing in the Welsh Premier Women's League, and was their highest scorer for three seasons.

In 2018 she joined Denbigh Town, playing with them until the 2020 season was cut short. She scored 18 goals for them in the 2019–20 season.

In 2021 she signed for Wrexham, scoring three goals in the opening match against Pwllheli. She went on to lead the Adran North league in goals. In 2022 she again led the league, with 24 goals in 9 appearances, as Wrexham gained promotion to the Adran Premier league.

In the 2023 season, she scored seven goals in the first three games, and 10 in the first 6, leading the league. She scored her 100th goal for Wrexham after 46 total appearances.

Hughes finished her first season in the Welsh top-flight (2023–24) with 18 goals across 24 games in league and cup as Wrexham finished third and reached the FAW Women's Cup final

She finished her second season in the Welsh top-flight (2024–25) with 9 goals across 28 games in league and cup as Wrexham finished fourth and reached the second FAW Women's Cup final in a row.

At the start of the 2026-27 season Hughes joined Connah's Quay Nomads following the expiry of her Wrexham contract at the end of the 2025–26 season

== Personal life ==
Hughes works at HM Prison Berwyn in Wrexham County, the largest prison in Britain.
