= Wrexham A.F.C. Women =

Women's association football club based in Wrexham, Wales

Wrexham AFC Women
- Full name: Wrexham Association Football Club Women
- Nicknames: The Red Dragons, The Robins
- Founded: 2003; 23 years ago
- Ground: The Rock, Rhosymedre, Wrexham
- Capacity: 3,000 (500 seated)
- Owner: Wrexham Holdings LLC
- Chairman: Rob McElhenney; Ryan Reynolds
- Manager: Jenny Sugarman
- League: Adran Premier
- 2025–26: Adran Premier, 1st of 8
- Website: www.wrexhamafc.co.uk/teams/womens-team
| Home colours | Away colours |

Wrexham Association Football Club Women (Welsh: Merched Clwb Pêl-droed Cymdeithas Wrecsam), formerly known as NEWI Wrexham Ladies and Wrexham Ladies F.C., are a Welsh semi-professional women's football club that competes in the Adran Premier, the first-tier of women's football in Wales.

Since 2009 and after their reformation in 2018, the club has been affiliated with Wrexham A.F.C., which competes in EFL Championship, the second division of English football. As NEWI Wrexham Ladies, they helped found the North Wales Women's Football League in 2003 and as Wrexham Ladies F.C. the Welsh Premier Women's League in 2009.

== History ==
=== 1993-2002: Wrexham Ladies FC's first incarnation ===
The first women's football team affiliated with the club was formed in 1993. They played their first match in July 1993 - a 2–2 draw against Chester City at Yale College and the following season joined the North West Women's Regional Football League's fourth division playing home matches at Stansty Park.

In their first season they secured a third-placed finish, and promotion to Division Three, and in 1995-96 they were promoted again, securing the runners' up spot and competed in the Women's FA Cup for the first time, losing to Manchester United.

The club moved their home games to Chester Road, Broughton in 1996. That season proved to be their peak - a 9th-placed finish in Division Two of the NWWRFL and a FAW Women's Cup quarter final appearance. The following season they were relegated after finishing bottom of the table, and at the end of the season severed their link with Wrexham, becoming Broughton Aerospace.

The club reverted to Wrexham for the 2001/02 season finishing fifth in the NWWRFL Division 1, before changing again to Airbus UK Broughton.

=== 2003–2018: NEWI Wrexham Ladies to Wrexham Ladies FC ===
In 2003, the NEWI Wrexham Ladies Football Club was formed, becoming part of the new North Wales Women's Football League. The initial squad drew players from the North East Wales Institute (NEWI) and the Yale College, Wrexham and played their home games next door to the Racecourse Ground.

In 2008, they reached the finals of the FAW Women's Cup for the first time. In 2009, they became part of Wrexham F.C., helped to found the Welsh Premier Women's League as one of four teams in the Northern Division and adopted the new name Wrexham Ladies FC. In the 2011–12 season, they won the division but lost the Championship Final against Cardiff Met WFC. The Welsh Premier League went national during the 2012–13 season and the team finished in third place.

They finished 6th in both of the following campaigns. During the 2015-16 season, they had a difficult time maintaining a full roster and withdrew from the Premier League mid-season.

=== 2018–2020: As Wrexham A.F.C. Women ===
In 2018, the club reformed as Wrexham A.F.C. Women, joining the North Wales Women's Football League to compete against teams across North Wales. Penycae F.C.'s Afoneitha Road was chosen for home matches and former Racecourse Community Foundation coach Luke Wynne became the manager. The League was split into Division One and Division Two in North Wales; Wrexham entered the bottom tier as a new club of Division Two. In that season, Wrexham won the North Wales Women's Division Two league cup, beating Rhyl Development 3–2 in a cup final hosted at Bala Town's Maes Tegid but lost the League's Supplementary Cup to Amlwch Town Ladies. They finished the season 4th in the league and gained promotion to Division One.

In the 2019/20 season, the COVID-19 pandemic cut the season short with Wrexham in 8th place after losing all league games. The Football Association of Wales decided to use points per game (PPG) calculation to work out the finishing positions for the teams in all leagues with no female teams being relegated.

=== 2020–2023: New owners, promotion to Adran Premier ===
In November 2020, Canadian-American actor Ryan Reynolds and American actor Rob McElhenney, through their RR McReynolds Company LLC, bought Wrexham A.F.C. Due to the Christmas 2020 second lockdown, the 2020–21 season was canceled with no games being played.

Before the start of the 2021–22 season, the FAW announced a restructure of Women's football in Wales, with a new Tier 2 league split into Adran North and Adran South with specific criteria needed to enter. The FAW opened up both tiers to all clubs to apply to join. Wrexham applied for the Tier 2 North and completed a successful first campaign as an inaugural member that new second tier, finishing runners-up to Llandudno Ladies F.C. after losing to the champions in a winner-takes-all game on the final day of the season at Maesdu Park.

On 9 February 2023, Wrexham announced they had applied for a Tier 1 license, and would become semi-professional if promoted to the Adran Premier for the 2023–24 season. They won the Adran North championship trophy on March 26 after winning all their league games and earned promotion after winning the playoff game 1–0 against Briton Ferry Llansawel, on April 16 in Latham Park.

=== 2023–2025: Adran Premier and turning semi-professional ===
On 27 June 2023, the club announced that ten players have signed semi-professional contracts, a first in club history, making them the first Adran Premier team to feature semi-professional players. Cardiff City F.C. did the same on 29 June and Swansea City Ladies F.C. on 16 August. At the start of 2024, they were third in the league with striker Rosie Hughes leading the league in scoring. They finished 3rd and reached the final of the FAW Women's Cup for the second time. The club was granted its first UEFA licence in March 2024. In June 2024, the team participated in the very first separate women's tournament of The Soccer Tournament where they failed to exit the group stage. In July 2024, the club made its first-ever tour abroad when it played three games in the USA through a sponsorship with Ally Financial, playing against SoCal FC (0–9), the U19 team of Tigres Femenil (1–6) and the academy team of Portland Thorns FC (0–7). The club finished 4th in the 2024–25 season, only one point behind The New Saints FC, after losing to them in the final game of the season and reached the finals of the FAW Women's Cup for the third time. In May 2025, the team became the first from the club to travel to Asia for the HKFC Soccer Sevens tournament, becoming the first Women's side to do so from outside of Asia. On 23 May 2025, Steve Dale resigned as manager after 4 seasons in charge.

=== 2025–present: The Sugarman-era ===
The club appointed former Leicester manager Jenny Sugarman as head coach on 25 July 2025 before the start of the 25/26 Adran Premier season. On February 8, the club made history by paying a transfer fee to sign Maria Francis-Jones from The New Saints, a first in the history of the Adran Leagues. The team won the Adran Trophy for the first time in February 2026, defeating Cardiff City Women in the final, and on March 29, for the first time in the club's and the league's history, have won the Adran Premier and earned the right to enter the qualifying rounds for the 2026–27 UEFA Women's Champions League.

The team played against Armenian side FC Pyunik in the first round of the Champions League qualifiers; they won 4–2, making them the first time a Welsh women's team won a game in the tournament since 2019, and the first Welsh team to score a goal since 2021. They were eliminated from the competition after losing 4–1 to Latvian side Riga FC.

== Stadium ==
They first played their home games at the North East Wales Institute, moved to Penycae F.C.'s Afoneitha Road after their reformation in 2018, then at the Brymbo Sports & Social Complex in Wrexham in 2021–22, and in Rhos Aelwyd F.C.'s Ponciau Banks in 2022–23.

For the 2023–24 season, the team moved to The Rock in Rhosymedre after reaching a multi-year agreement with Cefn Druids A.F.C. to see the women's section train and play their home games at The Rock Stadium. The capacity is 3,000 (500 seats).

On 5 August 2025, it was announced that Wrexham had completed the purchase of The Rock Stadium, making it the permanent home for Wrexham AFC Women. As a condition of the sale, Cefn Druids would continue to have use of the facilities for their training and fixtures.

== Sponsorship ==
In May 2023, the team's training kit was announced to be sponsored by Betty Buzz, a beverage company owned by Blake Lively, from the 2023–24 season.

=== Kit manufacturers and sponsors ===
| Period | Brand | Shirt Sponsor (chest) | Shirt Sponsor (back) | Shirt Sponsor (sleeve) |
|---|---|---|---|---|
| 2021–22 | Macron | TikTok | Expedia | Aviation American Gin |
| 2022–23 | Macron | TikTok | Expedia | Betty Buzz |
| 2023–24 | Macron | United Airlines | VistaPrint | Betty Buzz |
| 2024–26 | Macron | United Airlines | Meta Quest | HP |
| 2026–present | Macron | Firefox | Royal Bank of Canada; TOTM | Nex |

== Players ==
=== Squad ===
As of 15 August 2026

Note: Flags indicate national team as defined under FIFA eligibility rules; some limited exceptions apply. Players may hold more than one non-FIFA nationality.

| No. | Pos. | Nation | Player |
|---|---|---|---|
| 1 | GK | ENG | Liz Craven |
| 2 | DF | WAL | Phoebe Davies |
| 3 | DF | WAL | Liv Fuller |
| 4 | DF | ENG | Lydia Sallaway (on loan from Aston Villa W.F.C.) |
| 5 | DF | ENG | Jodie Bartle (captain) |
| 6 | MF | ENG | Nat Clark |
| 7 | FW | JAM | Natasha Thomas |
| 8 | FW | WAL | Evie Sadler |
| 9 | FW | ENG | Katie Barker |
| 11 | FW | PAK | Mariam Mahmood |
| 12 | DF | CAN | Sarah Harvey |
| 14 | DF | WAL | Josie Smith |

| No. | Pos. | Nation | Player |
|---|---|---|---|
| 15 | MF | WAL | Evie Holt |
| 16 | FW | WAL | Ava Suckley |
| 20 | MF | WAL | Bella Reidford |
| 21 | MF | WAL | Lili Jones |
| 22 | GK | WAL | Lucy Farrell |
| 25 | DF | NIR | Mikayla Wildgoose |
| 26 | DF | WAL | Maria Francis-Jones |
| 31 | GK | WAL | Sophie Nash |
| 33 | DF | WAL | Mikayla Cook |
| 31 | MF | WAL | Bella Riley |
| 44 | MF | WAL | Faye Knox |
| 67 | MF | WAL | Ana Jones |

=== Out on loan ===
Note: Flags indicate national team as defined under FIFA eligibility rules; some limited exceptions apply. Players may hold more than one non-FIFA nationality.

| No. | Pos. | Nation | Player |
|---|---|---|---|
| 28 | DF | ENG | Izzy Barnett (on loan at Shrewsbury Town Women until 30 June 2027) |
| — | MF | WAL | Leah Burke (on loan at Shrewsbury Town Women until 30 June 2027) |

== Player records ==
- Most goals in a season in all competitions: 65 – Lowri Edwards (2011–12)
- Most league goals in total: 78 – Lowri Edwards
- Most league appearances: 82 – Lyndsey Rodger (2011–2015)
- Most appearances in total: 116 – Rebecca Pritchard (2014–2025)

=== Women's Player of the Season ===
- 2021–22 - (Wales) Rosie Hughes
- 2022–23 - (Wales) Rosie Hughes
- 2023–24 - (Wales) Rosie Hughes
- 2024–25 - (England) Abbie Iddenden
- 2025–26 - (England) Katie Barker

=== Women's Young Player of the Season ===
- 2021–22 - (England) Amber Lightfoot
- 2022–23 - (England) Amber Lightfoot
- 2023–24 - (Wales) Lili Jones
- 2024–25 - (Wales) Lili Jones
- 2025–26 - (Wales) Faye Knox

=== Women's Players' Player of the Season ===
- 2021–22 - (Wales) TJ Dickens
- 2022–23 - (Wales) Erin Lovett
- 2023–24 - (Wales) Phoebe Davies
- 2024–25 - (England) Liz Craven
- 2025–26 - (England) Katie Barker

=== Women's Top Goalscorer ===
- 2021–22 - (Wales) Rosie Hughes (48)
- 2022–23 - (Wales) Rosie Hughes (42)
- 2023–24 - (Wales) Rosie Hughes (18)
- 2024–25 - (England) Abbie Iddenden (17)
- 2025–26 - (England) Katie Barker (29)

=== Goal of the Season ===
- 2024–25 - (Wales) Lili Jones (against TNS)
- 2025–26 - (Wales) Faye Knox (against Cardiff City)

=== Moment of the Season ===
- 2025–26 - (England) Katie Barker breaks record for league goals

== Seasons ==
| Season | League | | | | | | | | |
| Season | Division | Pld | W | D | L | GF | GA | Pts | Pos |
|---|---|---|---|---|---|---|---|---|---|
as Wrexham Ladies FC
| 1994-95 | North West Women's Regional Football League - Division 4 | 22 | 17 | 2 | 3 | 112 | 17 | 53 | 3rd |
| 1995-96 | North West Women's Regional Football League - Division 3 | 22 | 17 | 0 | 5 | 85 | 25 | 51 | 2nd |
| 1996-97 | North West Women's Regional Football League - Division 2 | 21 | 8 | 1 | 12 | 46 | 78 | 25 | 9th |
| 1997-98 | North West Women's Regional Football League - Division 2 | 20 | 1 | 1 | 18 | 30 | 137 | 4 | 11th (relegated) |
| 2009–10 | Welsh Premier Women's League - Northern conference | 6 | 0 | 1 | 5 | 7 | 17 | 1 | 4th |
| 2010–11 | Welsh Premier Women's League - Northern conference | 8 | 3 | 2 | 3 | 11 | 10 | 11 | 3rd |
| 2011–12 | Welsh Premier Women's League | 8 | 6 | 1 | 1 | 30 | 13 | 19 | Runner-up |
| 2012–13 | Welsh Premier Women's League | 20 | 13 | 2 | 5 | 67 | 27 | 41 | 3rd |
| 2013–14 | Welsh Premier Women's League | 20 | 6 | 6 | 8 | 34 | 35 | 24 | 6th |
| 2014–15 | Welsh Premier Women's League | 20 | 9 | 2 | 9 | 42 | 40 | 29 | 6th |
| 2015–16 | Welsh Premier Women's League | withdrew mid-season | | | | | | | |
as Wrexham AFC Women
| 2018–19 | North Wales Women's League, Div. 2 | 11 | 5 | 4 | 2 | 49 | 18 | 19 | 4th |
| 2019–20 | North Wales Women's League, Div. 1 | 7 | 0 | 0 | 7 | 4 | 31 | 0 | 8th |
| 2020–21 | season cancelled due to the COVID-19 pandemic | | | | | | | | |
| 2021–22 | Adran North | 14 | 11 | 0 | 3 | 77 | 28 | 33 | 2nd |
| 2022–23 | Adran North | 12 | 12 | 0 | 0 | 70 | 6 | 36 | 1st |
| 2023–24 | Adran Premier | 20 | 11 | 2 | 7 | 41 | 37 | 35 | 3rd |
| 2024–25 | Adran Premier | 20 | 10 | 2 | 8 | 40 | 32 | 32 | 4th |
| 2025–26 | Adran Premier | 20 | 16 | 1 | 3 | 70 | 26 | 49 | 1st |

== Record in UEFA Women's Champions League ==
| Season | Round | Opponent | Home | Away | Agg |
|---|---|---|---|---|---|
| 2026–27 | Round 1 | (Armenia) Pyunik | 4–2 | | |
| 2026–27 | Round 1 | (Latvia) Riga FC | 1–4 | | |

== Team records ==
- Attendance – 10,379 v Portland Thorns FC Academy, Friendly, 26 July 2024
- League Attendance – 9,511 v Connah's Quay Nomads Women, Adran North, 26 March 2023
- Highest league win – 19-1 v Cybi, Welsh Premier Women's League, 11 September 2011
- Worst league defeat – 1–12 v Llanfair United, North Wales Women's League, Div. 1, 8 September 2019
- Highest league finish - 1st, Adran Premier, 2025–26 Adran Premier
- Lowest league finish - 4th, North Wales Women's League, Div. 2, 2018–19
- Biggest cup win - 13–0 v Pwllheli, 2023–24 FAW Women's Cup, 15 October 2023
- Most league wins in a season - 16, Adran Premier, 2025–26 Adran Premier
- Most goals in a season – 77, Adran North, 2021–22
- Most clean sheets in a season – 27, 2011–12 Welsh Premier Women's League

== Club officials ==
As of 4 September 2026

| Role | Name |
|---|---|
| Director of Women's Football | (England) Mark Swales |
| General Manager | Saara Hassoun |
| Head Coach | (England) Jenny Sugarman |
| First Team Assistant Manager | (England) Rebecca Sawiuk |
| Goalkeeping Coach | (Wales) David Williams |
| Lead Performance Analyst | Bradley Perrett |
| Lead Strength & Conditioning Coach | Danny Burrus |
| Lead sport rehabilitator | (Wales) Owen Rees |
| Women’s First Team Goalkeeper Coach and Set Piece Analyst | Sam Naylor |

=== Managerial history ===
| Manager | Years |
|---|---|
| Mari Edwards | 2021 |
| Steve Dale | 2021–2025 |
| (England) Jenny Sugarman | 2025–present |

== Honours ==
League

- Adran Premier
  - (gold) Winners (1): 2025–26
  - (silver) Runners-up (1): 2011–2012
- Genero Adran North
  - (gold) Winners (1): 2022–23
  - (silver) Runners-up (1): 2021–22
- NWWFL Division Two
  - Promoted (1): 2018–19.

Cups

- Adran Trophy
  - (gold) Winners (1): 2025–26
- FAW Women's Cup
  - (silver) Runners-up (2): 2008, 2024, 2025
- NWWFL Division Two League Cup
  - (gold) Winners (1): 2019
- NWWFL Supplementary Cup
  - (silver) Runners-up (1): 2019

International

- HKFC Soccer Sevens
  - (silver) Runners-up (1): 2025

== Literature ==
- Champions 2022/23 – The Story Of A Record-Breaking Season, Wrexham A.F.C., 2023

Documents the campaigns of both teams.

== See also ==
- Welcome to Wrexham First featured in S2.
