= Llanidloes Ladies F.C. =

Llanidloes Ladies FC
- Full name: Llanidloes Ladies FC
- Founded: 2000
- Dissolved: 2018
Home colours	Away colours

Llanidloes Ladies were an association football club based in the town of Llanidloes, Powys, Wales.

== History ==
=== Formation ===
The club was formed in 2000 and was one of the founding members of the North Powys League.

=== Early Success ===
In the 2007/08 season, the club won their first silverware under Manager Richard Williams, winning the Central Wales Cup. In the 2007/08 season the club formed a reserves team who went on to win the North Powys Ladies League Division 2 undefeated in their first season. In 2008/09 the Club really showed how far they had come, winning the treble, The County Times Cup, The North Powys Ladies league and successfully defending the Central Wales Cup, with the reserve team also finishing runners-up in Division 2.

=== New Challenge of the National Premier League ===
With the club currently dominating Mid-Wales Football, they were chosen, as one of 8 clubs throughout Wales, to form a National League. The League was initially divided into two divisions, North and South, with Llanidloes playing in the North. However, as the league was initially small, they could continue to play in the North Powys League whilst still fulfilling their Premier fixtures. The club made Welsh Ladies Football history, playing in the first Welsh National League fixture against Aberystwyth in September 2009.

For the 2009/10 season the North Powys league Division 1 and 2 merged to form a larger more competitive League. This meant that the Reserves Team had to form a completely independent squad, so Llanidloes Reserves became Llanidloes Daffs for the new season. In the season 2009/2010 the club repeated it treble winning performances from the previous season, again lifting the County Times Cup, The North Powys Ladies league and the Central Wales Cup. Llanidloes in 2010 had lifted the Central Wales Cup in three consecutive seasons.

Llanidloes Ladies also had another milestone in 2009 when Nikki Bocking was called into the Wales Under 17s squad travelling to Belgium in September and Macedonia in October 2009.

=== The new single format Premier League ===
In its first three years, the Welsh Women`s Premier League was divided into two conferences, north and south, with Llanidloes competing in the North. The league changed the format to a single division for the 2012–13 season. When the league became a single division, it meant Llanidloes could no longer play in the North Powys League. The club renamed itself Hafren United before the 2014/15 season but withdrew before playing their first match.

=== Reforming ===
Llanidloes Ladies reformed in the summer of 2017 and entered the North Wales Women's Football League due to the lack of a Central Wales League. The club folded due to a dispute between the FAW and the league.

== Club Honours ==
- Division 1 League (2) 2008/09, 2009/10
- Central Wales Cup (3) 2007/08, 2008/09, 2009/10
- County Times Cup (2) 2008/09, 2009/10
- Welsh Premier League Cup
  - Runners-up: 2013–14

== Managers Past and Present ==
=== First Team Managers ===
Manager	Started	Finished	Trophies Won
Steve Cox	2000	2001	
Adrian Foulkes	2001	2003	
Gregg Jones	2003	2005	
Nicky Bray	2005	2007	
Richard Williams	2008	2009	Leagues (2008/09), Central Wales Cup (2007/08, 2008/09), County Times Cup (2008/09)
Gregg Harries	2009	2010	Leagues (2009/10), Central Wales Cup (2009/10), County Times Cup (2009/10)
Nicky George	2010	2013	Leagues (2010/11, 2011/12)
Nigel Mathias	2013	2014	
Jonathan Davies	2017	2018	
