= Caerphilly Castle Ladies F.C. =

Caerphilly Castle Ladies
- Full name: Caerphilly Castle Ladies and Girls Football Club
- Founded: 1999
- Ground: Owain Glyndwr Playing Fields; Caerphilly
- Chairman: Julie Boyce
- League: South Wales Women's and Girls League
Home colours

Caerphilly Castle Ladies are a football team based in Caerphilly in South Wales. They are one of the biggest Ladies and Girls Football Clubs in South Wales, and run teams from age 8 to adult.

== History ==
The club was founded in 1999 and competed in the South Wales Women's League. 2009 saw them reach the Women's Welsh Cup Final, losing 3–0 to eight-time winners Cardiff City Ladies.

2010 saw the club lift the South Wales Women's League Cup after a penalty shoot-out win over UWIC and in the same year they were awarded a place in the Women's Welsh Premier League. Caerphilly went on to fourth in their debut season.

== Top-flight record ==
Caerphilly joined the Women's Welsh Premier League in 2010. They won and lost exactly 50% of their matches, picking up wins over Newcastle Emlyn Ladies and Trefelin Ladies, while losing to Swansea Ladies and UWIC Women. As a result, they finished third out of five in their debut season.

In March 2013 they withdrew from the league, following a 43–0 loss.

== Club honours ==
- Women's Welsh Cup Runners Up: 2008/09
- South Wales Women's League Cup Winners: 2009/10
- South Wales Women's League Ladies 2nd place: Division 2 (Qualified to division one)
