= The Rock, Rhosymedre =

Welsh stadium

The Rock
- Y Stadiwm Roc or Y Graig (Welsh)
- Interactive map of The Rock
- Location: Rock Road, Rhosymedre, Wrexham, LL14
- Coordinates: 52.977212°N 3.069646°W
- Owner: Wrexham A.F.C.
- Capacity: 3,000 (500 seats)
- Surface: 3G

Construction
- Opened: 2010
- Main contractor: J Ross Developments

Tenants
- Cefn Druids A.F.C. (2010–present); Wrexham A.F.C. Women (2023–present); Cefn Albion F.C. (2017–2023); Gresford Athletic F.C. (2023–2024)

The Rock (Welsh: Y Stadiwm Roc or Y Graig) is a football stadium in Rhosymedre, Wales. It is currently the home stadium for Wrexham AFC Women, as well as Cefn Druids.

== History ==
In March 2009 planning permission was granted to demolish Cefn's old stadium, Plaskynaston Lane, and replace it with a Tesco supermarket. Delays to the beginning of construction put the project back by 12 months and the club moved into the new stadium in August 2010.

Cefn Druids and Gresford Athletic announced in March 2023 that they had signed a multi-year agreement to groundshare at the stadium, effective immediately and during at least the 23/24 season. The agreement remained in place until September 2024.

In March 2023, it was announced that Wrexham AFC Women would move to The Rock in order to obtain a Tier 1 license. On 5 August 2025, it was announced that Wrexham had completed the purchase of the stadium, making The Rock the permanent home for Wrexham AFC Women. As a condition of the sale, Cefn Druids would continue to have use of the facilities for their training and fixtures.

== Facilities ==
The complex at Rhosymedre includes a 512-seat stand, a clubhouse and a television gantry. As it is sited in a disused quarry, one side of the stadium features a sheer rock wall. In 2016, a 3G pitch was installed at the stadium.

In summer 2026, the club made further investment at the ground, including a new pitch and, in the clubhouse, a gym for the women's first team, work on the changing rooms and new office space.

== Attendances ==
The record attendance at the stadium was set in June 2017 as 1,854 attended a friendly against Wrexham. The record attendance for a regular season league game at The Rock is 662 for a game against TNS. A Europa League play off game against Cardiff Met in May 2018 attracted a crowd of 779 supporters.
