= Cardiff Met WFC =

Welsh football club

Coordinates: 51°30′44.982″N 3°9′34.9734″W

Cardiff Met Women AFC
- Full name: Cardiff Met Women AFC
- Nickname: The Archers
- Founded: 1992
- Ground: Cyncoed Campus, UWIC Cyncoed
- Capacity: 1,620
- Coach: Jonathan Nash
- League: Adran Premier
- 2025–26: Adran South, 1st of 8 (promoted)
- Website: https://www.pitchero.com/clubs/cardiffmetwfc
Home colours	Away colours

Cardiff Met WFC is a women's football club based in Cardiff, Wales. It is the student team of Cardiff Metropolitan University.

The club is one of the most successful Women's Welsh Premier League team after winning the title five times (2011–12, 2014–15, 2015–16, 2017–18 and 2018–19) and qualifying multiple times for the UEFA Women's Champions League.

The team was named UWIC Ladies until they changed their team name to Cardiff Met. Ladies AFC after the 2011–12 season. They then renamed from Ladies to Women's ahead of the 2018/19 season.

== Squad ==
As of 2 July 2026

Note: Flags indicate national team as defined under FIFA eligibility rules; some limited exceptions apply. Players may hold more than one non-FIFA nationality.

No.	Pos.	Nation	Player
-	GK	WAL	Verity Jones
-	DF	WAL	Faith Mulenga
-	DF	ENG	Sally Grimm
-	DF	ENG	Lydia Witchell
-	DF	ENG	Samantha Dziminowicz
-	DF	WAL	Carys Gittins
-	DF	WAL	Celyn Garton
-	DF	WAL	Sian Bull
-	MF	WAL	Emily Bayliss
-	MF	WAL	Gracie-Mae Howard
-	MF	WAL	Megan Gladwyn
-	MF	ENG	Lara Scott

No.	Pos.	Nation	Player
-	MF	ENG	Millie Pearce
-	MF	WAL	Maddison Coles
-	MF	WAL	Olivia Barnes
-	MF	ENG	Summer Kilby
-	MF	WAL	Anna Houghton
-	FW	WAL	Menna Churcher
-	FW	WAL	Scarlett Davies
-	FW	ENG	Ruby Colleton
-	FW	WAL	Demi Parry
-	FW	ENG	Esme Kilburn-Thompson
-	FW	WAL	Molly Chapman

== Top flight record ==
The club was a founding member of the Premier League in 2009, taking part in the four team Southern Conference.

The first two seasons saw the club finish in second place in the Southern Conference behind eventual champions Swansea City Ladies, having won all their matches, except the encounters with The Swans. The 2011/12 season proved to be their year as they avoided defeat against the reigning champions and qualified for the Championship Final, which they won 3–0 against Wrexham Ladies at Victoria Park, Llanidloes. Nadia Lawrence, Sophie Scherschel and Lauran Welsh scored the goals that sealed the club's first ever national title.

In the 2018–19 season, Cardiff Met Women won the domestic treble after winning the Premier League, the FAW Women's Cup and the Welsh Premier Women's Cup. Cardiff Met were also unbeaten in the domestic season, winning 14 and drawing 2 of their 16 league games.

Year	Pos	Played	Win	Draw	Loss	GF	GA	GD	Pts
2009/10	2	6	4	0	2	14	8	+6	12
2010/11	2	8	6	1	1	24	10	+14	19
2011/12	1	8	6	1	1	19	5	+14	19
2012/13	2	20	19	0	1	81	11	+70	57

== Honours ==
- Adran Premier:
  - Champions (6): 2011–12, 2013–14, 2014–15, 2015–16, 2017–18, 2018-19
- Adran South:
  - Champions: 2025–26
- FAW Women's Cup:
  - Champions (3): 2013–14, 2016–17, 2018-19
  - Runners-up: 2010, 2012, 2013
- Adran Trophy:
  - Champions (3): 2013–14, 2016–17, 2018-19
- British Universities & Colleges Sport (BUCS) champions 2012–13, 2013–14

== Record in UEFA Women's Champions League ==
=== Summary ===
Pld	W	D	L	GF	GA	Last season played
15	2	1	12	17	59	2018–19

=== By season ===
Season	Round	Opponent	Home	Away	Agg
2012–13	Qualifying round	(Israel) ASA Tel Aviv University	0–5		4th of 4
2012–13	Qualifying round	(Bosnia and Herzegovina) SFK 2000	0–1		4th of 4
2012–13	Qualifying round	(Republic of Ireland) Peamount United	0–4		4th of 4
2014–15	Qualifying round	(Israel) ASA Tel Aviv University	0–2		4th of 4
2014–15	Qualifying round	(Belgium) Standard Liège	0–10		4th of 4
2014–15	Qualifying round	(Portugal) Atlético Ouriense	2–1		4th of 4
2015–16	Qualifying round	(Poland) KKPK Medyk Konin	0–5		4th of 4
2015–16	Qualifying round	(Lithuania) Gintra Universitetas	1–5		4th of 4
2015–16	Qualifying round	(Republic of Ireland) Wexford Youths	1–5		4th of 4
2016–17	Qualifying round	(Bulgaria) NSA Sofia	4–0		3rd of 4
2016–17	Qualifying round	(Serbia) Spartak Subotica	2–3		3rd of 4
2016–17	Qualifying round	(Iceland) Breiðablik	0–8		3rd of 4
2018–19	Qualifying round	(Romania) Olimpia Cluj	2–3		3rd of 4
2018–19	Qualifying round	(Ukraine) Zhytlobud-1 Kharkiv	2–5		3rd of 4
2018–19	Qualifying round	(Malta) Birkirkara	2–2		3rd of 4
2019–20	Qualifying round	(Slovenia) Pomurje	1–0		2nd of 4
2019–20	Qualifying round	(Scotland) Hibernian	1–2		2nd of 4
2019–20	Qualifying round	(Georgia (country)) Tbilisi Nike	5–1		2nd of 4

== History ==
Cardiff Met. Ladies made history by recording the new record win for a Women's Premier League match on 10 March 2013 when they defeated Caerphilly Castle Ladies 43–0, surpassing a previous record set by Newcastle Emlyn Ladies against the same opponents. Emily Allen holds the record of the most goals in a Women's Premier League match, with 15 in Cardiff Met. Ladies record win.
