= Aberystwyth Town Ladies F.C. =

Welsh football club

Aberystwyth Town Women
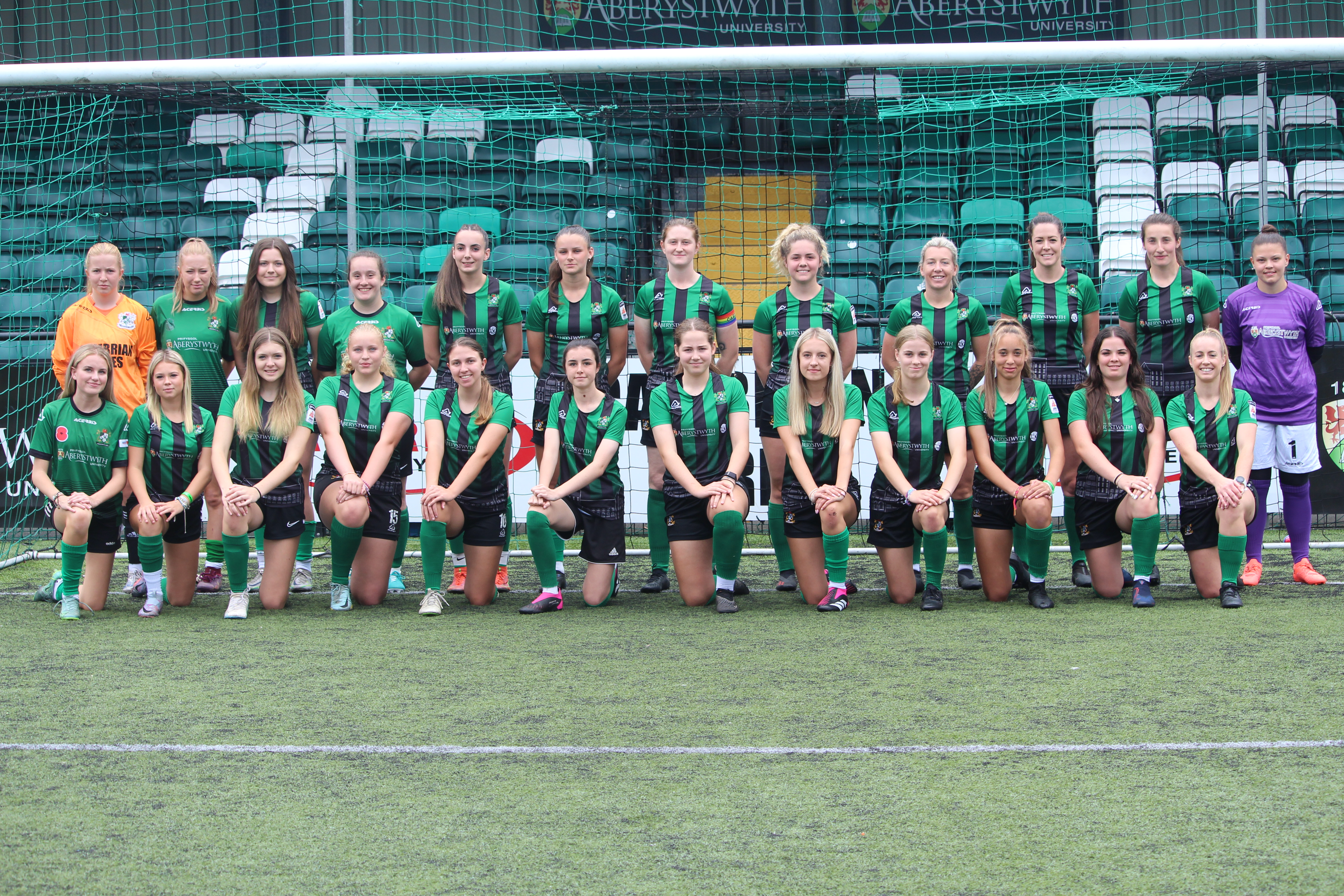
- Full name: Aberystwyth Town Women's Football Club
- Nickname: The Seasiders
- Ground: Park Avenue, Aberystwyth
- Capacity: 5,000 (1,002 seated)
- Chairman: Donald Kane
- Manager: Vacant
- League: Adran Premier
- 2025–26: Adran Premier, 7th of 8
- Website: atfc.org.uk/womens-squad
Home colours	Away colours

Aberystwyth Town Women's F.C. is a football team, playing in the Adran Premier, which they were founder members of in 2009.

The club plays its home matches at Park Avenue, Aberystwyth, which has a capacity of 5,000.

The team's first choice strip is green with the fortress depicted on their shirts with black shorts and green socks. The second choice strip is Pink shirts displaying a A in grey tones with Black trim, Black shorts and socks.

== History ==
Founder members of the Women's Welsh Premier League in 2009, Aberystwyth Town were an ever-present part of the league until they were relegated at the end of the 2016–2017 season. After two seasons in the second tier of Women's Welsh football, Aberystwyth Town were promoted back to the Welsh Premier League for the 2019–2020 season.

They reached the semi-finals of the FAW Women's Cup in 2010/11, losing 4-1 to Caernarfon Town.

In 2022/23, they reached two cup semi-finals, losing to Cardiff Met 3-1 in the Genero Adran Trophy, and to Briton Ferry Llansawel 3-0 in the FAW Women's Cup.

== Current squad ==
As of 8 September 2023

Note: Flags indicate national team as defined under FIFA eligibility rules; some limited exceptions apply. Players may hold more than one non-FIFA nationality.

No.	Pos.	Nation	Player
1	GK	ENG	
2	DF	WAL	
3	DF	WAL	Rebecca Mathias (vice-captain)
4	DF/MF	WAL	Bethan Roberts
5	DF	WAL	Elin Jones
6	MF	WAL	
7	MF	WAL	
8	MF	WAL	
9	FW	WAL	Libby Isaac
10	MF	ENG	Shauna Chambers
11	DF/MF/FW	WAL	Ffiona Evans
12	FW	WAL	Gwenllian Jones
14	FW	WAL	Lily Moralee-Hughes
15	MF/FW	WAL	
16	DF	WAL	Imi Scourfield
17	FW	WAL	Amy Jenkins (captain)

No.	Pos.	Nation	Player
18	DF	WAL	
19	MF	WAL	Modlen Gwynne
20	MF	WAL	Lleucu Mathias
30	GK	ENG	Sophie Steele

== Staff ==
Position	Name			
Club chairman	(Scotland) Donald Kane			
Club secretary	(Wales) Thomas Crockett			
Women's committee chair	(Wales) Mair Pugh Jones			
Manager	(Wales) Vacant			
Assistant Manager	(Wales)	Coaches	(Wales) Billy Brown - Head GK Coach	(Wales) Kelly Thomas - First Team Coach (Wales) Roy Tourle - First team Coach
Physio and sports therapy team	(India) Hozefa Mohamed Husain			
Kitman	(England) Nathan Perkins			
