= Swansea City Ladies F.C. =

Women's football club in Swansea, Wales

Coordinates: 51.645151°N 3.851810°W

Swansea City
- Full name: Swansea City Women Football Club
- Nickname: The Swans
- Founded: 2002; 24 years ago
- Ground: Llandarcy Academy of Sport; Neath, Wales
- Capacity: 2,000
- Manager: Yzzy Taylor
- League: Adran Premier
- 2025–26: Adran Premier, 3rd of 8
- Website: www.swanseacity.com/news?category=1578
Home colours	Away colours

Swansea City Women Football Club (Welsh: Clwb Pêl-droed Merched Dinas Abertawe) is a women's football club based in Swansea, Wales, currently playing in the Adran Premier, the top level of female competition in Wales.

== History ==
Formed in 2002, the team were members of the inaugural Welsh Premier Women's League in 2009/10 and came top of the Southern Conference, winning all six of their matches.

This set up a meeting with Northern winners, Caernarfon Town Ladies, with the winner clinching the title and becoming Wales' representatives in the UEFA Women's Champions League.

They beat the Canaries 4–0 at Haverfordwest to qualify for Europe for the very first time. For the first time Swansea qualified to UEFA competitions in 2010 after winning the Welsh Premier League. As Wales is not in the top leagues by the UEFA coefficient for women, the team had to go through the qualifying stage of the UEFA Women's Champions League. Swansea City were drawn out in Group 5 and paired with ŽNK Krka (Slovenia) – who hosted the mini group – top seeds CF Bardolino Verona (Italy) and FC Baia Zugdidi (Georgia). Swansea achieved one win in its group, beating Baia Zugdidi 2–1 and ended the group on place 3 of 4, thus failing to move on to the knockout stages.

They defended their title in 2011 again against Caernarfon with a 3–1 final win, thus would participate in the 2011–12 UEFA Women's Champions League.

19 April 2015 Swansea Beat Cardiff City Women's 4–2 in the FAW Women's Cup.

On 28 April 2016, Swansea beat PILCS in the Welsh Premier Women's League Cup 4–0.

In the 2016/2017 they lost the first game of the season in a thrilling 5–4 contest at home to Abergavenny. They then went on to remain unbeaten the whole season, winning the league comfortably, and crowned champions after a 4–0 win against Cyncoed. Setting the girls up for a return to Europe. The girls headed to Cluj, Romania, where they played Hibernian, Olimpia Cluj and Zhytlobud-2.

Returning home after Champions League, the women went on to secure second in the league after a tough campaign. They did win the FAW Cup, 2–1 with goals coming from Jodie Passmore and Katy Hosford to beat Cardiff City at the Cardiff City Stadium, bring the FAW cup home to Liberty Stadium in Swansea

As of August 2023, Swansea City Ladies F.C became Swansea City AFC Women semi-professional team.

== Players ==
=== Current squad ===
As of 2 July 2026 Note: Flags indicate national team as defined under FIFA eligibility rules; some limited exceptions apply. Players may hold more than one non-FIFA nationality.

No.	Pos.	Nation	Player
1	GK	WAL	Amelia Forkings
13	GK	WAL	Opal Rayner
2	DF	WAL	Lauren Davies
5	DF	WAL	Steph Turner
15	DF	WAL	Ellie Lake
16	DF	IRL	Eilish Mitchell
20	DF	WAL	Caitlin Williams
23	DF	WAL	Jessica Williams
8	MF	WAL	Sammy Wynne
4	MF	WAL	Maddy Murray
7	MF	WAL	Maisie Miller
6	MF	WAL	Emily Richards
10	FW	WAL	Chloe Chivers
9	FW	WAL	Aimee Deacon
18	FW	WAL	Taite Trivett
21	FW	WAL	Emily Thomas

== Honours ==
Adran Premier:

- Champions (1): 2021-2022

Welsh Premier Women's League:

- Champions (5): 2009–10, 2010–11, 2016–17, 2019–20, 2020–21
  - Runners-up: 2014–15, 2015–16, 2017–18, 2018–19
- Welsh Women's Cup:
  - Champions (3): 2011, 2015, 2018
  - Runners-up: 2014, 2017
- Adran Trophy:
  - Champions (1): 2016
  - Runners-up: 2015, 2019, 2025
- South Wales Women's League
  - Champions: 2006–07, 2007–08, 2008–09, 2009–10, 2011–12
- South Wales Women's League Cup
  - Champions: 2007, 2008

== Record in UEFA Women's Champions League ==
=== Summary ===
Pld	W	D	L	GF	GA	Last season played
12	2	0	10	7	48	2022–23

=== By season ===
Season	Round	Opponent	Home	Away	Agg
2010–11	Qualifying round	(Italy) Bardolino	0–7		3rd of 4
2010–11	Qualifying round	(Slovenia) Krka	0–4		3rd of 4
2010–11	Qualifying round	(Georgia (country)) Baia Zugdidi	2–1		3rd of 4
2011–12	Qualifying round	(Ukraine) Lehenda-ShVSM	0–2		3rd of 4
2011–12	Qualifying round	(Cyprus) Apollon Limassol	0–8		3rd of 4
2011–12	Qualifying round	(Luxembourg) Progrès Niederkorn	4–0		3rd of 4
2017–18	Qualifying round	(Scotland) Hibernian	0–5		4th of 4
2017–18	Qualifying round	(Romania) Olimpia Cluj	0–3		4th of 4
2017–18	Qualifying round	(Ukraine) Zhytlobud-2 Kharkiv	0–9		4th of 4
2020–21	Round 1	(Cyprus) Apollon Limassol	0–3		
2021–22	Round 1	(Russia) CSKA Moscow	1–4 (aet)		
2022–23	Round 1	(Greece) PAOK	0–2		

== Coaching staff ==
Updated: 29 September, 2025

Position	Name
Head coach	(Wales) Yzzy Taylor
Assistant coach	-
Assistant coach	-
Goalkeeping coach	-
