= 2016–17 Welsh Premier Women's League =

Welsh Premier Women's Football League
- Season: 2016–17
- Champions: Swansea City Ladies (3rd title)
- Relegated: Aberystwyth Town Ladies; Briton Ferry Llansawel Ladies
- UEFA Women's Champions League: Swansea City Ladies
- Matches: 90
- Goals: 386 (4.29 per match)
- Top goalscorer: Lyndsey Davies (28 goals)
- Biggest home win: Cardiff City 10–1 Port Talbot Town
- Biggest away win: Aberystwyth Town 0–6 Swansea City
- Highest scoring: Cardiff City 10–1 Port Talbot Town
- Longest winning run: 14 wins (Swansea City)
- Longest unbeaten run: 17 games (Swansea City)
- Longest losing run: 6 losses (Briton Ferry Llansawel, Aberystwyth Town, Rhyl)

The 2016–17 Welsh Premier League was the eighth season of the Women's Welsh Premier League, the top level women's football league in Wales. The season began on 4 September 2016 and ended on 23 April 2017.

Swansea City Ladies won their third league title, seven points clear of the previous season's winners Cardiff Met. Cardiff Met. won both the Premier League Cup and the Welsh Cup.

Lyndsey Davies of Abergavenny Women won the Golden Boot after scoring 28 goals and also became the first player to reach 100 Premier League goals. Previous Golden Boot winner Shannon Evans finished second with 22 goals. Player of the Season was won by Abergavenny Women's Katrina French. Young Player of the Season was awarded to Alice Griffiths of Cyncoed.

In November 2016, Orchard Media and Events Group became the first headline sponsor of the Welsh Women's Premier League.

== Clubs ==
Locations of teams in the 2016–17 Premier League

Despite a fourth-place finish in the previous season, Cwmbran Celtic withdrew from the league for the 2016-17 citing failure to attract a manager and senior players as the reason for their withdrawal. Briton Ferry Llansawel were the team promoted to replace the relegated Newcastle Emlyn and would play their first season in the Premier League. 2015-16 League Cup runners-up PILCS moved to Abergavenny and were renamed Abergavenny Women. 10 teams ended up competing in the league.

Team	City	Ground
Aberystwyth Town Ladies	Aberystwyth	Park Avenue
Abergavenny Women FC	Abergavenny	Pen-Y-Pound Stadium, Abergavenny
Briton Ferry Llansawel Ladies	Briton Ferry	Old Road, Briton Ferry
Cardiff City Women	Cardiff	Leckwith Athletics Stadium
Cardiff Metropolitan Ladies	Cardiff	Cardiff Metropolitan University, Cyncoed Campus
Cyncoed Ladies	Cardiff	Cardiff University Playing Fields, Llanrumney
Llandudno Ladies	Llandudno Junction	Maesdu Park
Port Talbot Town Ladies	Port Talbot	The Genquip Stadium
Rhyl Ladies	Rhyl	Rhyl FC's Corbett Sports Stadium
Swansea City Ladies	Port Talbot	Baglan Playing Fields

== Standings ==
Pos	Team	Pld	W	D	L	GF	GA	GD	Pts	Qualification or relegation	SWA	CAM	CAC	ABG	CYN	LLA	POR	RHY	ABE	BRI
1	Swansea City	18	16	1	1	65	16	+49	49	Qualification to 2017–18 Champions League	—	2–1	4–3	4–5	5–0	3–1	5–0	4–0	3–0	8–0
2	Cardiff Metropolitan	18	13	3	2	57	20	+37	42		2–2	—	3–2	1–1	2–0	3–1	1–1	5–2	7–0	4–0
3	Cardiff City	18	11	2	5	62	30	+32	35		3–4	1–4	—	1–2	2–2	6–1	10–1	5–1	1–1	5–3
4	Abergavenny Women	18	11	2	5	47	23	+24	35		0–1	0–2	0–1	—	2–0	6–1	2–0	5–1	2–0	7–1
5	Cyncoed Ladies	18	6	4	8	37	43	−6	22		0–1	4–1	2–6	4–1	—	4–2	0–4	4–3	4–0	3–5
6	Llandudno Ladies	18	6	4	8	36	48	−12	22		1–4	0–4	1–3	4–2	2–2	—	3–3	3–2	2–0	3–1
7	Port Talbot Town	18	4	3	11	22	45	−23	15		0–2	0–3	0–3	0–3	3–2	1–1	—	1–2	3–0	2–3
8	Rhyl Ladies	18	3	3	12	23	51	−28	12		0–4	1–3	1–5	0–3	1–3	1–1	3–1	—	4–0	1–1
9	Aberystwyth Town	18	3	3	12	12	50	−38	12	Relegation	0–6	0–4	0–1	0–4	1–1	1–6	2–0	3–0	—	3–1
10	Briton Ferry Llansawel Ladies	18	2	5	11	25	60	−35	11	Relegation	0–3	3–7	0–4	2–2	2–2	2–3	0–2	0–0	1–1	—

Updated to match(es) played on 20 August 2019. Source: Soccerway
Rules for classification: 1) Points; 2) Goal difference; 3) Number of goals scored

== Awards ==
=== Monthly awards ===
Month	WPWL Manager of the Month		WPWL Player of the Month		References
Month	Manager	Club	Player	Club	References
September	Richie Jermeiah	Abergavenny Women	Emily Allen	Cardiff Metropolitan	
October	Ian Owen	Swansea City Ladies	Tania Wylde	Aberystwyth Town Ladies	
November	Fern Burrage	Cyncoed Ladies	Lauren Lyons	Cardiff City	
December	Ian Owen	Swansea City Ladies	Katrina French	Abergavenny Women	
January	Kerry Harris	Cardiff Metropolitan	Ceri Hudson	Abergavenny Women	
February	Tom Jamieson	Rhyl Ladies	Megan Kearle	Briton Ferry Llansawel Ladies	

=== Annual awards ===
Award	Winner	Club
WPWL Player of the Season	Katrina French	Abergavenny Women
WPWL Young Player of the Season	Alice Griffiths	Cyncoed Ladies
WPWL Golden Boot	Lyndsey Davies	Abergavenny Women

== League Cup ==
← 2015–16 · 2017–18 →

This was the fourth season of the WPWL Cup and Cardiff Met won the competition for the second time in their history. Briton Ferry Llansawel, Llandudno Ladies, Swansea City, Port Talbot Town and Aberystwyth Town all received byes into the quarter finals. Cardiff City also went straight through to the quarter final stage as Cwmbran Celtic withdrew. The cup was won by Cardiff Met, beating Abergavenny Women 4–2 in the final, in spite of a sending off, with goals from Jassie Vasconcelos (2), Chloe O'Connor and Erin Murray.

=== Round One ===
Cwmbran Celtic withdrew allowing Cardiff City a bye into the quarter finals.

6 November 2016	Abergavenny Women	5–0	Rhyl Ladies	Pen y Pound Stadium
14:00	Lyndsey Davies; Amy Thrupp; Alana Murphy

6 November 2016	Cardiff Metropolitan	4–1	Cyncoed Ladies	Cardiff Met Cyncoed Campus
14:00

=== Quarter-finals ===
4 December 2016	Briton Ferry Llansawel Ladies	2–5	Abergavenny Women	Old Road, Briton Ferry
14:00	Mollie Jones; Claudia Meyrick pen.'		Gabi Hughes; Alana Murphy; Kate Jeremiah; Lyndsey Davies; Claudia Meyrick o.g.'

4 December 2016	Cardiff Metropolitan	4–1	Cardiff City FC	Cardiff Met Cyncoed Campus
14:00	Jassie Vasconcelos 48', 75'; Chloe O'Connor 51' (pen.); Carys Hill	Report	Alicia Davies 84'

4 December 2016	Llandudno Ladies F.C.	0–3	Swansea City Ladies	Maesdu Park, Llandudno
14:00			Jodie Passmore 50'; Stacey John 53'; Sophie Hancocks 60'

4 December 2016	Port Talbot Town Ladies	6–2 (a.e.t.)	Aberystwyth Town Ladies	The Genquip Stadium, Port Talbot
14:00	Jesci Hare 1'; Terri Beddows 89'; Vicky Stratton 91', 95'; Danni Franklin 111'; Jessica Hammett 114'		Amy Jenkins 18', 43'

=== Semi-finals ===
29 January 2017	Cardiff Metropolitan	3–1 (a.e.t.)	Swansea City Ladies	Cardiff Met Cyncoed Campus
14:00	Lauren Townsend 74'; Jassie Vasconcelos 108'		Jodie Passmore 20'

29 January 2017	Port Talbot Town Ladies	0–4	Abergavenny Women	The Genquip Stadium, Port Talbot
14:00			Lyndsey Davies 36'; Ceri Hudson 57'; Katie Adams 59'; Alana Murphy 63'

=== Final ===
26 February 2017	Abergavenny Women	2-4	Cardiff Metropolitan	Leckwith Stadium, Cardiff
14:00	Ceri Hudson 57'; Lyndsey Davies 66'	Report	Chloe O'Connor 19'; Jassie Vasconcelos 61'; Stephanie Turner (red card) 56'; Erin Murray 64'
