= 2017–18 Welsh Premier Women's League =

Welsh Premier Women's Football League
- Season: 2017–18
- Champions: Cardiff Metropolitan Ladies (5th title)
- Relegated: Caldicot Town; Caernarfon Town
- UEFA Women's Champions League: Cardiff Metropolitan Ladies
- Matches: 90
- Goals: 402 (4.47 per match)
- Top goalscorer: Lyndsey Davies (22 goals)
- Biggest home win: Cardiff Metropolitan 12-0 Caernarfon Town
- Biggest away win: Caernarfon Town 1–8 Cardiff City; Caernarfon Town 0–7 Swansea City; Caernarfon Town 0–7 Abergavenny Women
- Highest scoring: Cardiff Metropolitan 12-0 Caernarfon Town
- Longest winning run: 12 wins (Cardiff Metropolitan)
- Longest unbeaten run: 14 games (Cardiff Metropolitan)
- Longest losing run: 14 losses (Caernarfon Town)

The 2017–18 Welsh Premier League was the ninth season of the Women's Welsh Premier League, the top level women's football league in Wales. The season began on 3 September 2017 and ended on 2 May 2018.

Cardiff Metropolitan Ladies won their fifth league title, five points clear of the previous season's winners Swansea City. Cyncoed Ladies won the Premier League Cup, the first piece of silverware that the team had won. Swansea City won the FAW Women's Cup – the third time that they have won the trophy.

Lyndsey Davies of Abergavenny Women won the Golden Boot for the second season in a row after scoring 22 goals.

Player of the Season was won by Cardiff City's Shannon Evans and Young Player of the Season was awarded to Ellie Lake of Swansea City.

== Clubs ==
Locations of teams in the 2017–18 Premier League

One of the league's founding teams Caernarfon Town were promoted back to the Premier League and Caldicot Town played their first season in the top flight. 10 teams ended up competing in the league.

Team	City	Ground
Abergavenny Women FC	Abergavenny	Pen-Y-Pound Stadium, Abergavenny
Caernarfon Town Women	Caernarfon	The Oval, Caernarfon
Caldicot Town	Caldicot	Jubilee Way, Caldicot
Cardiff City Women	Cardiff	Leckwith Athletics Stadium
Cardiff Metropolitan Ladies	Cardiff	Cardiff Metropolitan University, Cyncoed Campus
Cyncoed Ladies	Cardiff	Cardiff University Playing Fields, Llanrumney
Llandudno Ladies	Llandudno Junction	Maesdu Park
Port Talbot Town Ladies	Port Talbot	The Genquip Stadium
Rhyl Ladies	Rhyl	Rhyl FC's Corbett Sports Stadium
Swansea City Ladies	Port Talbot	Baglan Playing Fields

== Standings ==
Pos	Team	Pld	W	D	L	GF	GA	GD	Pts	Qualification or relegation	CAM	SWA	ABG	CYN	CAC	POR	LLA	RHY	CAE	CAL
1	Cardiff Metropolitan	18	15	2	1	62	12	+50	47	Qualification to 2018–19 Champions League	—	2–1	5–0	2–1	3–2	2–0	3–0	6–0	12–0	2–0
2	Swansea City	18	13	3	2	64	12	+52	42		1–2	—	1–1	1–0	3–0	2–2	4–0	5–0	6–0	4–0
3	Abergavenny Women	18	12	2	4	61	25	+36	38		1–0	2–3	—	2–0	5–1	5–2	4–2	7–3	5–0	4–0
4	Cyncoed Ladies	18	12	1	5	42	20	+22	37		1–1	0–3	2–1	—	1–0	2–3	3–0	3–1	7–0	2–3
5	Cardiff City	18	8	3	7	47	32	+15	27		1–4	2–2	1–1	0–3	—	1–2	4–2	4–0	4–1	6–1
6	Port Talbot Town	18	8	1	9	39	40	−1	25		2–3	0–4	1–5	1–2	0–3	—	1–0	5–0	7–3	2–1
7	Llandudno Ladies	18	6	1	11	29	43	−14	19		0–1	0–6	1–4	0–4	0–3	3–0	—	3–0	5–0	2–6
8	Rhyl Ladies	18	4	2	12	26	62	−36	14		2–2	1–5	1–5	1–3	0–4	2–1	2–5	—	3–0	3–3
9	Caernarfon Town Women	18	1	0	17	9	92	−83	3	Relegation	0–6	0–7	0–7	1–3	1–8	1–4	0–3	0–2	—	1–0
10	Caldicot Town (Note: Deducted 9 points for fielding an ineligible player)	18	3	1	14	23	64	−41	1	Relegation	0–6	0–6	0–3	1–3	3–5	1–6	0–3	1–5	3–1	—

Updated to match(es) played on 18 September 2019. Source: Soccerway
Legend: Blue = home team win; Yellow = draw; Red = away team win.
Rules for classification: 1) Points; 2) Goal difference; 3) Number of goals scored

== Awards ==
=== Monthly awards ===
Month	WPWL Manager of the Month		WPWL Player of the Month		References
Month	Manager	Club	Player	Club	References
September	Joel Hutton	Cardiff City	Maxine Mudge	Abergavenny Women	
October	Kerry Harris	Cardiff Metropolitan	Louisha Doran	Llandudno Ladies	
November/December	Kerry Harris	Cardiff Metropolitan	Ashleigh Harris	Caldicot Town	
January	Fern Burrage	Cyncoed Ladies	Laura Wililams	Rhyl Ladies	
February/March	Ian Owen	Swansea City Ladies	Alisha Young	Caldicot Town	

=== Annual awards ===
Award	Winner	Club
WPWL Player of the Season	Shannon Evans	Cardiff City
WPWL Young Player of the Season	Ellie Lake	Swansea City Ladies
WPWL Golden Boot	Lyndsey Davies	Abergavenny Women

== League Cup ==
← 2016–17 · 2018–19 →

This was the fifth season of the WPWL Cup and Cyncoed Ladies won the competition for the first time in their history. Cyncoed beat Cardiff Metropolitan 1-0 after extra time. Jasmine Simpson of Cardiff Metropolitan scored the most goals in the competition with 4 in 4 games.

=== Round one ===
5 November 2017	Cardiff City	3–1	Llandudno Ladies	Cardiff International Sports Campus
14:00	Chelsea Cochrane 12'; Shannon Evans 69', 90'		Katie Bowe 43'

5 November 2017	Cardiff Metropolitan	6–1	Caernarfon Town	Cardiff Met Cyncoed Campus
14:00	Jasmine Simpson 3', 5'; Robyn Pinder 10', 81'; Tija Richardson 49'; Erin Murray 80'		Ffion Owen 48'

=== Quarter-finals ===
3 December 2017	Abergavenny Women	4–1	Cardiff City	Pen-y-Pound Stadium, Abergavenny
13:30	Kate Jeremiah 10', 65'; Maxine Mudge 30', 70'	Report	Shannon Evans 31'

3 December 2017	Caldicot Town	0–3	Cardiff Metropolitan	Jubilee Way, Caldicot
13:30		Report	Jasmine Simpson; Erin Murray

3 December 2017	Port Talbot Town Ladies	1–2 (a.e.t.)	Rhyl Ladies	The Genquip Stadium, Port Talbot
13:30	Jesci Hare 18'	Report	Emily Jones 90', 100'

3 December 2017	Swansea City Ladies	2–3	Cyncoed Ladies	Llandarcy Academy of Sport, Llandarcy
13:30	Stacey John Davis 7'; Sarah Adams 51'	Report	Julia Moulton 38'; Rosina Hill 55'; Gwen Davies 86'

=== Semi-finals ===
7 January 2018	Abergavenny Women	3–4 (a.e.t.)	Cardiff Metropolitan	Pen-y-Pound Stadium, Abergavenny
13:30	Own goal Kate Jeremiah 84'; Maxine Mudge 89'	Report	Naomi Clipston 24', 55'; Stephanie Turner 32'; Monique Fisher 96'

7 January 2018	Cyncoed Ladies	3–0	Rhyl Ladies	USW Sports Park, Treforest
12:00	Caitlin Bevan 18'; Jessica Williams 47'; Julia Moulton 87'	Report

=== Final ===
25 March 2018	Cardiff Metropolitan	0-1	Cyncoed Ladies	Dragon Park, Newport
14:00		Report	Julia Moulton 5'
