= 2018–19 Welsh Premier Women's League =

Welsh Premier Women's Football League
- Season: 2018–19
- Champions: Cardiff Metropolitan Ladies (6th title)
- Relegated: Rhyl Ladies; Caernarfon Town (withdrew from league)
- UEFA Women's Champions League: Cardiff Metropolitan Ladies
- Matches: 72
- Goals: 303 (4.21 per match)
- Top goalscorer: Madison Schupbach (18 goals)
- Biggest home win: Swansea City 7–0 Rhyl Ladies; Port Talbot Town 7–0 Rhyl Ladies; Swansea City 7–0 Briton Ferry Llansawel
- Biggest away win: Cyncoed Ladies 0–8 Cardiff Metropolitan
- Highest scoring: Cardiff City 6–3 Llandudno Ladies
- Longest winning run: 10 wins (Cardiff Metropolitan)
- Longest unbeaten run: 16 games (Cardiff Metropolitan)
- Longest losing run: 8 losses (Briton Ferry Llansawel)

The 2018–19 Welsh Premier League was the tenth season of the Women's Welsh Premier League, the top level women's football league in Wales. The season began on 2 September 2018 and ended on 28 April 2019.

Cardiff Metropolitan Ladies completed the domestic treble after winning the league title, the FAW Women's Cup and the Welsh Premier Women's Cup. This was their sixth league title and an unbeaten season, winning 14 and drawing 2 of their 16 games. It was their second consecutive league title. It was also the third time they had won the FAW Women's Cup and the third time they had won the Welsh Premier Women's Cup.

Madison Schupbach of Cardiff Metropolitan won both the Golden Boot after scoring 18 goals and Player of the Season in her first year in the league. Young Player of the Season was awarded to Shaunna Jenkins of Swansea City.

== Clubs ==
Locations of teams in the 2018–19 Premier League

After finishing in the bottom two in the 2017–18 season, Caernarfon Town ended up remaining in the top division after the North Wales Women's League winners Northop Hall did not apply for promotion. However, in November Caernarfon Town withdrew from the league with immediate effect and their results up until that point were expunged. The league continued with nine teams competing. After relegation in the 2016–17 season, Briton Ferry Llansawel made an immediate return to the top flight for the 2018–19 season.

Team	City	Ground
Abergavenny Women FC	Abergavenny	Pen-Y-Pound Stadium, Abergavenny
Briton Ferry Llansawel Ladies	Briton Ferry	Old Road, Briton Ferry
Caernarfon Town Women*	Caernarfon	The Oval, Caernarfon
Cardiff City Women	Cardiff	Leckwith Athletics Stadium
Cardiff Metropolitan Ladies	Cardiff	Cardiff Metropolitan University, Cyncoed Campus
Cyncoed Ladies	Cardiff	Cardiff University Playing Fields, Llanrumney
Llandudno Ladies	Llandudno Junction	Maesdu Park
Port Talbot Town Ladies	Port Talbot	The Genquip Stadium
Rhyl Ladies	Rhyl	Rhyl FC's Corbett Sports Stadium
Swansea City Ladies	Port Talbot	Baglan Playing Fields

*Withdrew from the league mid-season

== Standings ==
Pos	Team	Pld	W	D	L	GF	GA	GD	Pts	Qualification or relegation	CAM	SWA	CAC	POR	ABG	LLA	CYN	BRI	RHY
1	Cardiff Metropolitan	16	14	2	0	58	8	+50	44	Qualification to 2019–20 Champions League	—	2–0	1–0	5–0	4–1	5–0	3–1	2–0	5–0
2	Swansea City	16	11	3	2	57	7	+50	36		0–0	—	0–0	5–1	0–1	6–0	6–0	7–0	7–0
3	Cardiff City	16	10	2	4	41	18	+23	32		1–2	0–2	—	1–1	2–6	6–3	2–0	3–1	5–0
4	Port Talbot Town	16	8	3	5	39	28	+11	27		1–1	0–5	0–1	—	3–1	3–1	6–1	5–0	7–0
5	Abergavenny Women	16	8	2	6	37	24	+13	26		0–4	0–2	0–2	4–0	—	2–2	4–0	3–0	1–1
6	Llandudno Ladies	16	4	2	10	28	54	−26	14		2–5	0–4	1–4	2–4	0–5	—	1–2	2–1	4–0
7	Cyncoed Ladies	16	4	1	11	18	50	−32	13		0–8	2–2	1–4	0–2	1–5	3–5	—	0–2	2–0
8	Briton Ferry Llansawel Ladies	16	3	2	11	16	53	−37	11		0–6	1–6	0–6	1–1	2–1	3–3	0–4	—	1–2
9	Rhyl Ladies	16	1	1	14	9	61	−52	4	Relegation	2–5	0–5	0–4	0–5	1–3	1–2	0–1	2–4	—

Updated to match(es) played on 4 October 2019. Source: Soccerway
Rules for classification: 1) Points; 2) Goal difference; 3) Number of goals scored

== Awards ==
=== Annual awards ===
Award	Winner	Club
WPWL Player of the Season	Madison Schupbach	Cardiff Metropolitan
WPWL Young Player of the Season	Shaunna Jenkins	Swansea City Ladies
WPWL Golden Boot	Madison Schupbach	Cardiff Metropolitan

== League Cup ==
← 2017–18 · 2019–20 →

This was the sixth season of the WPWL Cup. The previous season's winners Cyncoed Ladies were drawn first out of the hat, meaning they were one of four teams who would play in the first round, as the rest of the teams received a bye into the quarter-finals. However, they made it no further than the quarter-finals as they were knocked out by eventual winners Cardiff Metropolitan. Cardiff Metropolitan beat Swansea City 3–1 in the final.

=== Round One ===
6 September 2018	Cyncoed Ladies	2–0	Briton Ferry Llansawel Ladies	USW Sports Park, Treforest
14:00	Caitlin Bevan 39'; Kirstie Pervin-Davies 87'	Report

6 September 2018	Caernarfon Town	2–7	Llandudno Ladies	The Oval, Caernarfon
14:00	Ffion Owen	Report	Kelsey Davies; Fflur Williams; Mari Gibbard; Anna Jones; Sophie Owen

=== Quarter-finals ===
2 December 2018	Abergavenny Women	1–2 (a.e.t.)	Cardiff City	Pen-y-Pound Stadium, Abergavenny
14:00	Laura Davies 62'	Report	Danielle Broadhurst 32', 98'

2 December 2018	Cyncoed Ladies	0–5	Cardiff Metropolitan	USW Sports Park, Treforest
14:00		Report	Madison Schupbach; Rebecca Mathias; Tija Richardson; Naomi Clipston

2 December 2018	Llandudno Ladies	2–3	Rhyl Ladies	Maesdu Park
14:00	Mari Gibbard; Kelsey Davies	Report	Zoe Stopford 17'; Rachel Nattrass 55'; Rebecca Bannister 59'

2 December 2018	Port Talbot Town Ladies	1–2	Swansea City Ladies	The Genquip Stadium
14:00	Laura May Walkley 32'	Report	Sarah Adams 11'; Jodie Passmore 90+8' (pen.)

=== Semi-finals ===
27 January 2019	Cardiff Metropolitan	2–1	Cardiff City	Cardiff Met Cyncoed Campus
11:00	Naomi Clipston 62'; Madison Schupbach 72'	Report	Zoe Atkins 32'

27 January 2019	Swansea City Ladies	7–0	Rhyl Ladies	Llandarcy Academy of Sport
14:00	Katy Hosford 18', 52', 81'; Emma Beynon 43', 62'; Kelly Adams 45'	Report

=== Final ===
5 April 2019	Cardiff Metropolitan	3–1	Swansea City Ladies	Stebonheath Park, Llanelli
19:30	Olivia Thompson 16'; Madison Schupbach 47'; Alice Griffiths 84'	Report	Katy Hosford 90'
