= 2018–19 FAW Women's Cup =

Tournament details
- Country: Wales
- Teams: 34

Final positions
- Champions: Cardiff Met
- Runners-up: Abergavenny

The 2018–19 FAW Women's Cup is the 27th edition of the FAW Women's Cup, the premier knock-out cup competition for women's association football teams in Wales.

Most teams entered the competition at the first round stage, however there were also three qualifying round matches and Swansea City were given a bye to the second round as reigning champions, having beaten Cardiff City in the previous season's final.

== Format ==
The tournament is a single-elimination knock-out tournament, with six teams entering in the qualifying round, 27 receiving a bye to the first round proper, and the reigning champions entering at the second round stage.

== Calendar ==
Round	Main Date	Number of Fixtures	Clubs
Qualifying round	16 September 2018	3	34 → 31
First round	14 October 2018	15	31 → 16
Second round	18 November 2018	8	16 → 8
Quarter-finals	10 February 2019	4	8 → 4
Semi-finals	17 March 2019	2	4 → 2
Final	14 April 2019	1	2 → 1

== Qualifying round ==
The draw for the qualifying round took place at the FAW's headquarters in Cardiff. All three matches took place on Sunday 16 September 2018.

Tie	Date	Home team	Result	Away team
Southern section
1	16 September	Cascade Youth Club	7–0	Villa Dino Christchurch
2	16 September	Coed Duon Dragons	1–7	Splott Albion
3	16 September	Rhos	0–3	Willows

== First round ==
Home team	Result	Away team
14 October 2018
Aberdare Town	0–10	Splott Albion
Aberystwyth Town	5–0	Merthyr Town
Barry Town United	2–0	Penybont
Briton Ferry Llansawel	H–W	Caerphilly Castle
Cardiff Met.	6–0	Caldicot Town
Denbigh Town	0–2	Llanfair United
Llandudno	13–0	Corwen
Llangyfelach	1–8	Cyncoed
Northop Hall Girls	1–2	Airbus UK Broughton
Rhyl	5–0	Amlwch Town
Tredegar Town	1–11	Cardiff City Women
21 October 2018
Dafen	1–2	Cascade Youth Club
Kinmel Bay	5–6	Caernarfon Town
Penrhyncoch	0–16	Port Talbot Town
Willows	0–8	Abergavenny

== Second round ==
Home team	Result	Away team
18 November 2018
Abergavenny	1–0	Cascade Youth Club
Airbus UK Broughton	0–2	Rhyl
Briton Ferry Llansawel	7–1	Splott Albion
Cardiff City Women	3–1	Port Talbot Town
Cardiff Met.	2–1	Swansea City
Cyncoed	7–2	Barry Town United
Llandudno	4–0	Aberystwyth Town
Llanfair United	1–2	Caernarfon Town

== Quarter-finals ==
Home team	Result	Away team
10 February 2019
Cardiff City Women	6–1	Rhyl
Cyncoed	0–5	Cardiff Met.
Llandudno	1–2	Abergavenny
17 February 2019
Briton Ferry Llansawel	H–W	Caernarfon Town

== Semi-finals ==
17 March 2019
14:00 GMT

Cardiff Met.	3–2	Briton Ferry Llansawel
Tiley 22'; Schupbach 50'; Clipston 62' (pen.)	Report	Braithwaite 20'; Powell 64' (pen.)

Cardiff International Sports Stadium, Cardiff
31 March 2019
14:00 BST

Abergavenny	2–0	Cardiff City Women
Jeremiah 20', 30'	Report

Plough Road, Pontypool

== Final ==
14 April 2019
14:00 BST

Abergavenny	0–2	Cardiff Met.
	Report	Schupbach 19', 35'

Dragon Park, Newport
