= 2015–16 Welsh Premier Women's League =

Welsh Premier League
- Season: 2015–16
- Champions: Cardiff Met. Ladies (4th title)
- Relegated: Newcastle Emlyn
- UEFA Women's Champions League: Cardiff Met. Ladies
- Matches: 110
- Goals: 544 (4.95 per match)
- Biggest home win: Cardiff Met. 12–0 Aberystwyth Town
- Biggest away win: Port Talbot Town 0–10 PILCS
- Highest scoring: MBi Llandudno Ladies 3–10 Cwmbran Celtic
- Longest winning run: 8 wins (Swansea City)
- Longest unbeaten run: 20 games (Cardiff Met.)
- Longest losing run: 7 losses (Newcastle Emlyn)

The 2015–16 Welsh Premier League was the seventh season of the Women's Welsh Premier League, the top level women's football league in Wales. The season began on 13 September 2015 and ended on 30 May 2016.

Cardiff Met. Ladies were the defending champions and retained the title after completing an unbeaten season, winning 18 and drawing 2 of their 20 games.

Shannon Evans from Cardiff City won the top goalscorer award after scoring 37 goals, despite being a makeshift forward due to injury. Player of the Season was won by Cardiff Met. captain Emily Allen.

== Clubs ==
Locations of teams in the 2015–16 Premier League

Despite finishing sixth in the 2014–15 season, Wrexham ladies dropped out of the league for the 2015–16 season citing a lack of players. Cyncoed Ladies replaced Wrexham Ladies in the league, after winning the South Wales Women's and Girls League Division 1. 11 teams ended up competing in the league.

Team	City	Ground
Aberystwyth Town Ladies	Aberystwyth	Park Avenue
Cardiff City Women	Cardiff	Leckwith Athletics Stadium
Cardiff Metropolitan Ladies	Cardiff	Cardiff Metropolitan University, Cyncoed Campus
PILCS Ladies	Pontypool	
Cwmbran Celtic	Cwmbran	
Cyncoed Ladies	Cardiff	Cardiff University Playing Fields, Llanrumney
MBi Llandudno Ladies	Llandudno Junction	Maesdu Park
Newcastle Emlyn Ladies	Newcastle Emlyn	Parc Emlyn
Port Talbot Town Ladies	Port Talbot	The Genquip Stadium
Rhyl & Prestatyn Ladies	Prestatyn	Rhyl FC's Corbett Sports Stadium
Swansea City Ladies	Port Talbot	Baglan Playing Fields

== Standings ==
Pos	Team	Pld	W	D	L	GF	GA	GD	Pts	Qualification or relegation	CAM	SWA	CAC	CWM	PIL	LLA	POR	CYN	ABE	RHY	NEW
1	Cardiff Metropolitan	20	18	2	0	115	14	+101	56	Qualification to 2016–17 Champions League	—	2–1	2–0	4–1	6–2	8–0	8–2	6–0	12–0	9–0	10–0
2	Swansea City	20	16	2	2	47	10	+37	50		0–0	—	2–1	2–2	2–0	2–1	5–0	2–0	2–0	3–0	7–0
3	Cardiff City	20	13	3	4	74	28	+46	42		1–1	0–2	—	1–1	4–1	2–1	3–0	2–1	6–2	4–3	11–0
4	Cwmbran Celtic	20	12	4	4	63	38	+25	40		1–9	0–2	1–1	—	1–4	7–1	2–1	3–2	1–1	3–1	6–1
5	PILCS	20	13	0	7	79	41	+38	39		4–8	2–1	1–3	3–6	—	7–1	4–1	2–1	7–0	5–0	9–0
6	MBi Llandudno Ladies	20	7	2	11	53	70	−17	23		1–8	0–2	3–6	3–10	4–3	—	3–3	0–1	4–0	8–2	11–0
7	Port Talbot Town	20	6	3	11	32	56	−24	21		0–3	0–1	3–2	0–4	0–10	1–1	—	1–2	3–1	5–1	2–1
8	Cyncoed Ladies	20	5	2	13	23	52	−29	17		1–5	0–2	0–3	0–4	2–5	1–5	4–1	—	2–0	0–4	1–0
9	Aberystwyth Town	20	4	2	14	21	59	−38	14		0–3	1–2	1–5	0–2	0–2	2–1	0–3	1–1	—	1–2	4–0
10	Rhyl & Prestatyn	20	4	2	14	28	72	−44	14		0–5	1–4	3–9	1–3	1–4	0–1	1–1	3–1	1–3	—	3–2
11	Newcastle Emlyn	20	0	2	18	9	104	−95	2	Relegation to South Wales Women's & Girls' League	0–6	0–3	0–5	1–5	0–4	0–4	0–5	3–3	0–4	1–1	—

Updated to match(es) played on 11 August 2019. Source: Welsh Premier Women's League
Rules for classification: 1) Points; 2) Goal difference; 3) Number of goals scored

== League Cup ==
← 2014–15 · 2016–17 →

This was the third season of the WPWL Cup and Swansea City were the third different team to win the competition. Aberystwyth Town Ladies, Cwmbran Celtic Ladies, Cyncoed Ladies and MBI Llandudno all received byes into round two and Wrexham Ladies were forced to withdraw which allowed Swansea City Ladies a bye into the quarter-finals. The cup was won by Swansea City, beating defending champions PILCS 4–0 with goals from Katy Hosford (2), Emma Benyon and Sophie Hancocks.

=== Round One ===
Wrexham Ladies withdrew allowing Swansea City a bye into the quarter-finals.

1 November 2015	Newcastle Emlyn	0–7	PILCS	Parc Emlyn
14:00		Report	Jassie Costa 11'; Shauna Pentney 31'; Lindsay Davies 35', 61', 66'; Alana Murphy 45', 70'

1 November 2015	Port Talbot Town	0–3 (a.e.t.)	Cardiff City	The Genquip Stadium
14:00		Report	Lisa Bird 94'; Kylie Davies 110'; Alicia Davies 115'

1 November 2015	Rhyl & Prestatyn	0–8	Cardiff Metropolitan	Corbett Sports Stadium
14:00		Report	Stacey Ayling 3'; Steph Turner 13'; Erin Murray 23', 81'; Emily Allen 35', 78'; Robyn Pinder 39'; Abi Fever 55'

=== Quarter-finals ===
6 December 2015	Cardiff Metropolitan	9–2	MBi Llandudno Ladies	Cardiff Metropolitan University
13:30

6 December 2015	Cwmbran Celtic	2–3	PILCS	Celtic Park, Cwmbran
13:30	Lauren Boyd 35', 52'		Alana Murphy 20'; Jassie Costa 60', 70'

6 December 2015	Cyncoed Ladies	2–4	Cardiff City	Cardiff University Playing Fields, Llanrumney
13:30		Report	Nicola Jones; Shannon Evans

13 December 2015	Aberystwyth Town	0–4	Swansea City	Evan Bevans Playing Field, Baglan
13:30

=== Semi-finals ===
24 January 2016	PILCS	3–1	Cardiff Metropolitan	New Road, Pontypool
14:00	Alana Murphy 5'; Jassie Costa 20', 38'	Report	Stacey Ayling 60'

24 January 2016	Cardiff City	1–3 (a.e.t.)	Swansea City	Leckwith Athletics Stadium
14:00	Chelsea Cochrane 70' (pen.)	Report	Emma Beynon 54'; Jodie Passmore

=== Final ===
28 April 2016	PILCS	0-4	Swansea City
19:30		Report	Katy Hosford 4', 65'; Emma Beynon 60'; Sophie Hancocks 75'
