= 2019–20 Welsh Premier Women's League =

Welsh Premier Women's Football League
- Season: 2019–20
- Champions: Swansea City (4th title)
- Relegated: None
- UEFA Women's Champions League: Swansea City
- Matches: 41
- Goals: 133 (3.24 per match)
- Biggest home win: Port Talbot Town 4–0 Aberystwyth Town; Cardiff City 5–1 Abergavenny; Port Talbot Town 4–0 Abergavenny
- Biggest away win: Cyncoed Ladies 0–7 Swansea City
- Highest scoring: Cyncoed Ladies 0–7 Swansea City; Port Talbot Town 5–2 Briton Ferry Llansawel
- Longest winning run: 9 wins (Swansea City)
- Longest unbeaten run: 11 games (Swansea City)
- Longest losing run: 10 losses (Aberystwyth Town)

The 2019–20 Welsh Premier League was the eleventh season of the Women's Welsh Premier League, the top level women's football league in Wales. The season began on 8 September 2019 and was suspended indefinitely in March due to the COVID-19 pandemic.

In May, it was confirmed that the season would be deemed complete and an unweighted points per game method would be used to determine the league winner. After an unbeaten season, Swansea City were crowned champions for the fourth time in their history, winning 10 and drawing 1 of their 11 games. Swansea City also reached the final of the WPWL Cup, but their game against Cardiff Met. to decide the winner of the competition did not take place after the FAW National Cup Board terminated the competition.

Alana Murphy of Cardiff City won the Golden Boot after scoring 10 goals in 10 games. Swansea City goalkeeper Deanna Lewis won the Golden Glove after only conceding one goal during the season.

== Clubs ==
Locations of teams in the 2019–20 Premier League

After finishing at the bottom of the table in the 2018–19 season, Rhyl Ladies ended up remaining in the top division after no teams applied for promotion from the North Wales Women's League. However, in August it was announced that Rhyl Ladies would be withdrawing their place in the competition, citing a lack of players. The league began with nine times, but in December Llandudno Ladies also withdrew from the league with immediate effect and their results up until that point were expunged. The league finished with eight competing teams.

Team	City	Ground
Abergavenny Women FC	Abergavenny	Pen-Y-Pound Stadium, Abergavenny
Aberystwyth Town	Aberystwyth	Park Avenue (Aberystwyth)
Briton Ferry Llansawel Ladies	Briton Ferry	Old Road, Briton Ferry
Cardiff City Women	Cardiff	Leckwith Athletics Stadium
Cardiff Metropolitan Ladies	Cardiff	Cardiff Metropolitan University, Cyncoed Campus
Cyncoed Ladies	Cardiff	Cardiff University Playing Fields, Llanrumney
Llandudno Ladies*	Llandudno Junction	Maesdu Park
Port Talbot Town Ladies	Port Talbot	The Genquip Stadium
Swansea City Ladies	Swansea	Baglan Playing Fields

*Withdrew from the league mid-season

== Standings ==
Pos	Team	Pld	W	D	L	GF	GA	GD	Pts	Qualification or relegation	SWA	CAM	CAC	POR	CYN	BRI	ABG	ABE
1	Swansea City	11	10	1	0	30	1	+29	31	Qualification to 2020–21 Champions League	—	1–0	2–0				3–0	3–0
2	Cardiff Metropolitan	11	9	0	2	25	4	+21	27		0–1	—	3–0	4–1	2–0	2–0		1–0
3	Cardiff City	10	7	1	2	25	9	+16	22		0–0		—		3–0	2–1	5–1	4–1
4	Port Talbot Town	12	7	0	5	24	18	+6	21		0–2	0–3	1–2	—	1–0	5–2	4–0	4–0
5	Cyncoed Ladies	11	3	2	6	12	26	−14	11		0–7	1–4		1–3	—	2–1	1–1	3–2
6	Briton Ferry Llansawel Ladies	8	1	1	6	8	19	−11	4		0–4			1–2	2–2	—		1–0
7	Abergavenny Women	9	1	1	7	4	23	−19	4		0–2	0–2	0–3	2–1	0–2		—	
8	Aberystwyth Town	10	0	0	10	5	33	−28	0		1–5	0–4	0–6	1–2				—

Updated to match(es) played on 8 March 2020. Source: Soccerway
Legend: Blue = home team win; Yellow = draw; Red = away team win.
Rules for classification: 1) Points; 2) Goal difference; 3) Number of goals scored

== Awards ==
=== Annual awards ===
Award	Winner	Club
WPWL Golden Boot	Alana Murphy	Cardiff City
WPWL Golden Glove	Deanna Lewis	Swansea City Ladies

== League Cup ==
← 2018–19 · 2021–22 →

This was the seventh season of the WPWL Cup. The competition was revamped to include a group stage with each team playing two home games and two away games, with the top two teams progressing to the semi-final. Swansea City topped Group 1, with Cardiff City finishing runners up. Cardiff Met. topped Group 2, with Port Talbot Town finishing runners up. In the semi-finals, Cardiff Met. beat Cardiff City on penalties following a 2–2 draw and would have gone on to play Swansea City in the final after their 3–0 victory over Port Talbot Town. The final did not end up taking place and as such there was no winner of the competition. The following season was cut short due to the COVID-19 pandemic, during which the league was rebranded to the Adran Premier. The next League Cup would be the 2021-22 Adran Trophy.
