= 2014–15 Welsh Premier Women's League =

Welsh Premier League (women)
- Season: 2014–15
- Champions: Cardiff Met. Ladies (3rd title)
- UEFA Women's Champions League: Cardiff Met. Ladies
- Matches: 100
- Goals: 516 (5.16 per match)
- Biggest home win: Cardiff Metropolitan 19–0 Newcastle Emlyn
- Biggest away win: Aberystwyth Town 0–9 Cwmbran Celtic
- Highest scoring: Cardiff Metropolitan 19–0 Newcastle Emlyn

The 2014–15 Welsh Premier League is the sixth season of the Women's Welsh Premier League, the top level women's football league in Wales.

Cardiff Met. Ladies were the defending champions and retained the title on goal difference over Swansea City.

Lyndsey Davies from PILCS won the top scorer award for a second year in a row.

== Clubs ==
Locations of teams in the 2014–15 Premier League

For this season Llandudno Junction renamed to Llandudno Ladies and moved to 3G facility at Maesdu Park. Llanidloes Ladies was renamed to Hafren United Ladies FC. They however withdrew from the league before the start of the season. Caernarfon had withdrawn from the league after the 2013/14 season, they were replaced by Aberystwyth Town. Hafren United though also withdraw before the league starts, thus this season is played only with eleven teams.

Team	City	Ground
Aberystwyth Town Ladies	Aberystwyth	Park Avenue
Cardiff City Women	Cardiff	Leckwith Athletics Stadium
Cardiff Metropolitan Ladies	Cardiff	Cardiff Metropolitan University, Cyncoed Campus
PILCS Ladies	Pontypool	
Cwmbran Celtic	Cwmbran	
Hafren United Ladies	Llanidloes	Victoria Park
Llandudno Ladies	Llandudno Junction	Maesdu Park
Newcastle Emlyn Ladies	Newcastle Emlyn	Parc Emlyn
Port Talbot Town Ladies	Port Talbot	The Genquip Stadium
Rhyl & Prestatyn Ladies	Prestatyn	Rhyl FC's Corbett Sports Stadium
Swansea City Ladies	Port Talbot	Baglan Playing Fields
Wrexham Ladies	Wrexham	Colliers Road

== Standings ==
No team was relegated because Hafren United withdrew before the season.

Pos	Team	Pld	W	D	L	GF	GA	GD	Pts	Qualification or relegation	CAM	SWA	PIL	CAC	POR	WRE	CWM	LLA	RHY	NEW	ABE
1	Cardiff Metropolitan	20	16	2	2	97	11	+86	50	Qualification to 2015–16 Champions League	—	0–1	5–0	0–0	2–0	5–0	4–0	8–0	6–0	19–0	10–0
2	Swansea City	20	16	2	2	73	16	+57	50		1–1	—	4–1	0–1	2–0	2–0	4–0	5–2	7–0	3–2	11–0
3	PILCS	20	14	1	5	69	35	+34	43		3–0	3–1	—	4–1	3–0	3–1	6–2	1–3	8–0	6–0	3–1
4	Cardiff City	20	13	3	4	60	24	+36	42		0–7	1–2	1–2	—	7–0	6–0	2–0	2–1	4–0	6–0	11–0
5	Port Talbot Town Ladies	20	9	3	8	36	31	+5	30		1–4	1–1	5–0	1–1	—	4–1	0–0	3–0	4–1	5–1	5–0
6	Wrexham	20	9	2	9	42	40	+2	29		1–3	0–3	4–3	0–2	1–0	—	3–3	2–1	5–1	5–0	9–0
7	Cwmbran Celtic	20	7	4	9	48	42	+6	25		1–4	2–3	3–3	1–3	2–0	0–0	—	2–0	1–3	7–0	7–1
8	Llandudno	20	8	1	11	31	45	−14	25		1–4	0–4	1–4	2–2	0–1	2–0	2–1	—	2–3	4–0	2–0
9	Rhyl & Prestatyn	20	6	0	14	23	74	−51	18		1–5	1–7	1–5	1–2	2–3	1–2	2–4	0–2	—	1–0	3–2
10	Newcastle Emlyn	20	3	0	17	24	92	−68	9		1–5	1–6	1–6	2–3	1–0	0–5	2–3	2–4	5–1	—	5–0
11	Aberystwyth Town	20	1	0	19	13	106	−93	3		0–5	0–6	1–5	1–5	2–3	1–3	0–9	1–2	0–1	3–1	—

Updated to match(es) played on 10 May 2015. Source: Welsh Premier League
Rules for classification: 1) Points; 2) Goal difference; 3) Number of goals scored

== League Cup ==
← 2013–14 · 2015–16 →

For the second time a League Cup was played. In the first round four teams (Hafren United, Caernarfon Town, Cwmbran Celtic and Cardiff City FC) were drawn to receive a bye to the second round. After Hafren United withdrew from the league, one team was drawn to have a bye in the quarter-finals. Caernarfon were replaced by Aberystwyth Town after they withdrew last season. PILCS won the final 3–2 over Swansea City to win their first nationwide trophy.

First round
Newcastle Emlyn	2–3	Port Talbot Town	28 September 2014
PILCS	2–1	Wrexham FC
Rhyl & Prestatyn FC	0–10	Cardiff Metropolitan
Swansea City	2–0	Llandudno FC
Quarter-finals
Aberystwyth Town	0–2	Port Talbot Town	16 November 2014
Cardiff City FC	1–3	Swansea City	7 December 2014
Cwmbran Celtic	w/o	Cardiff Metropolitan	Cwmbran withdraw
PILCS	–	bye
Semi-finals
Port Talbot Town	3–4	PILCS	23 January 2015
Swansea City	2–0	Cardiff Metropolitan	25 January 2015
Final
PILCS	3–2	Swansea City	27 March 2015
