= 2025–26 FAW Women's Cup =

Tournament details
- Country: Wales

The 2025–26 FAW Women's Cup (also known as Bute Energy Welsh Cup for sponsorship reasons) is the 31st edition of the FAW Women's Cup, the premier knock-out cup competition for women's association football teams in Wales.

== Qualifying round ==
=== First round ===
Home team	Result	Away team
21 September 2025
North
NFA (Note: Prestatyn Town FC withdrew from the competition, NFA gained a bye to the next round)	A/W	Prestatyn Town
Buckley Town	1–17	Wrexham Foresters
28 September 2025
Denbigh Town	5–0	Northop Hall
South
Pontarddulais Town	2–5	Ammanford
Trefelin BGC	11–0	Cardiff Wanderers
Aberystwyth University (Note: Aberystwyth University gained a bye to the next round)	A/W	Llandarcy

=== Second round ===
Home team	Result	Away team
19 October 2025
North
Llanfair United	0–1	Llangefni Town
Denbigh Town	1–5	NFA
Wrexham Foresters	4–2	Y Felinheli
Berriew	1–1 (Note: Llanystumdwy won 8–7 on penalties)	Llanystumdwy
Bangor (Note: Bangor gained a bye to the next round)	A/W	Llanidloes Town
Y Rhyl 1879	v	Pwllheli (Note: Rhyl withdrew from the competition, Pwllheli gained a bye to the next round)
Flint Town United	4–2	Kinmel Bay
Llandudno	2–1	Connah's Quay Nomads
South
Nantyglo	5–5 (Note: Nantyglo won 3–2 on penalties)	Skewen
Taffs Well (Note: Taffs Well gained a bye to the next round)	A/W	Aberystwyth University
Llantwit Fardre	6–3	Penydarren BGC
Porth Harlequins	0–0 (Note: Porth Harlequins won 3–2 on penalties)	North Cardiff Cosmos
Llanelli Town	1–2	Carmarthen Town
Trefelin BGC	3–1	Cascade YC
Morriston Town	2–5	Undy
Wattsville	4–0	Rogerstone
Pure Swansea	7–0	Johnstown
Cambrian United	5–0	Fairwater
Penybont (Note: Penybont gained a bye to the next round)	A/W	Cwmamman United
Cardiff Met	21–0	Ystradgynlais
Pontypridd (Note: Pontypridd gained a bye to the next round)	A/W	Caerau Ely
Penclawdd	0–4	Cwmbran Celtic
AFC Llwydcoed	0–5	Goytre
Caldicot Town	A/W	Ammanford (Note: Ammanford gained a bye to the next round)

== Round 1 ==
23 November 2025 Round 1	Undy	1–3	Llantwit Fardre	Undy
14:00 BST	Buckland 35'	Report	Davies 17' 26'; Blandford 71'	Stadium: The Causeway; Referee: Michal Baniak

23 November 2025 Round 1	Penybont	0–0 (a.e.t.) (4–2 p)	Barry Town Utd	Bridgend
14:00 BST		Report		Stadium: Dragonbet Stadium Bridgend; Referee: Andrew Robert Wallen
	Penalties
	Hodgkinson (penalty scored); Fahey-Pennell (penalty missed); Williams (penalty scored); Thomas (penalty scored); Taylor (penalty scored)		(penalty scored) Turner; (penalty missed) Gunney; (penalty missed) Thomas; (penalty scored) Herbert

23 November 2025 Round 1	Aberystwyth Town	1–3	Swansea City	Aberystwyth
14:00 BST	Gardner 81'	Report	Deacon 17'; Murray 45'; Chivers 51'	Stadium: Park Avenue, Aberystwyth; Referee: Richard Lee Wright

23 November 2025 Round 1	Taffs Well	3–3 (a.e.t.) (2–4 p)	Pure Swansea	Cardiff
14:00 BST	Rose 17'; Jones 46' 56'	Report	Wilson 7'; Davies 19' 53'	Stadium: Rhiw Dda'r; Referee: Marco Griffiths
	Penalties
	Northmore (penalty missed); Wickham (penalty missed); Brown (penalty scored); Jones (penalty scored)		(penalty scored) Haynes; (penalty scored) Stokes; (penalty scored) Hateley; (penalty scored) Lee

23 November 2025 Round 1	Llangefni Town	2–2 (a.e.t.) (4–5 p)	Llandudno	Llangefni
14:00 BST	Owen 48'; Coulson 51'	Report	Owen 45'	Stadium: Cae Bob Parry; Referee: Robin Williams
	Penalties
	Owen (penalty scored); Gadd (penalty scored); Brown (penalty missed); Jones (penalty scored)		(penalty scored) Dutton; (penalty scored) Williams; (penalty scored) Bentley; (penalty scored) Whitefoot; (penalty scored) Cashen

23 November 2025 Round 1	Pontypridd United	6–1	Pontypridd AFC	Pontypridd
14:00 BST	Lloyd 7' 31' 72'; D'Ambrosio 19' 37'; Cockayne 62'	Report	Voyle 56'	Stadium: USW Sports Park; Referee: Daryl Leigh Jenkins

23 November 2025 Round 1	NFA	0–11	Wrexham AFC	Rhyl
14:00 BST		Report	Hughes 6' 25' 29' 45'; Jones 14'; Hillier-Knox 54' 59'; Iddenden 64'; Suckley 71'	Stadium: Ffordd Derwen Playing Fields; Referee: Craig Griffiths

23 November 2025 Round 1	Ammanford	0–7	Briton Ferry Llansawel	Ammanford
16:00 BST		Report	Kearle 52' 77'; Crofts 54' 67' 75'; Owen 72'; Thomas 88'	Stadium: Ammanford Recreation Ground; Referee: Gemma Amanda May Border

23 November 2025 Round 1	Flint Town United	0–5	Wrexham Foresters	Flint
14:00 BST		Report	Miller 15'; Tobin 27' 44' 46'; Kural 56'	Stadium: Essity Stadium; Referee: Rubie Bennett

23 November 2025 Round 1	The New Saints	10–0	Bangor	Oswestry
14:00 BST	Harrison 11'; Chapman 17' 30' 36'; Webb 21' 76' 78' 90'; Crees 43'; Francis-Jones 85'	Report		Stadium: Park Hall; Referee: Lilah Thomas

23 November 2025 Round 1	Goytre (Monmouthshire)	0–1	Carmarthen Town	Pontypool
14:00 BST		Report	Guymer 80'	Stadium: Plough Road; Referee: Terry Leonard

23 November 2025 Round 1	Llanystumdwy	2–1	Pwllheli	Criccieth
14:00 BST	Evans 11' 35'	Report	Rees-Williams 40'	Stadium: Parc Dwyfor; Referee: Gwilym Tudor Evans

23 November 2025 Round 1	Porth Harlequins BGC	2–5	Cambrian United	Tonypandy
14:00 BST	Mallin 41'; Lewis 72'	Report	Isaac 4' 45'; Lockwood-Jones 26' 35'; McMullen 49'	Stadium: Dinas Park; Referee: Ewan Reed

23 November 2025 Round 1	Cardiff City	5–0	Cardiff Met	Cardiff
14:00 BST	Olden 19'; Curnock 65'; Malin 74'; Long 77'; Barry 82'	Report		Stadium: Cardiff International Sports Stadium; Referee: Vasilica Valentin Ciuplea

30 November 2025 Round 1	Nantyglo	A/W	Trefelin	Abertillery
14:00 BST		Report		Stadium: Duffryn Park; Referee: Leighton Christopher Walkley
Note: Nantyglo has withdrawn from the cup

30 November 2025 Round 1	Wattsville	0–19	Cwmbran Celtic	Cwmbran
16:00 BST		Report	Bidhendy 1'; Boyd 1' 11' 15' 45'; Daniels 23' 61' 62' 85'; Cridland 36'; Jones 40'; Challenger 54'; Grosvenor 54' 60' 78' 79'; Anthony 71' 82'	Stadium: Llantarnam School 3G; Referee: James Thomas Jennings

== Round 2 ==
The draw for the second round was held on 27 November 2025.

21 December 2025 Round 2	Swansea City	10–0	Llanystumdwy	Neath
14:00 BST	Wynne 21'; Richards 34' 53'; Trivett 64'; John 67' 77'; Miller 69'; Lake 72'; Chivers 74'; Williams 90'	Report		Stadium: Llandarcy Academy Of Sport; Referee: Paul Gary Jones

21 December 2025 Round 2	Briton Ferry Llansawel	5–0	Pure Swansea	Briton Ferry
14:00 BST	Crofts 6' 38'; Denscombe 66'; Payne 73' 85'	Report		Stadium: The Renewable Centre Stadium; Referee: David Morgan

21 December 2025 Round 2	Carmarthen Town	2–1	Pontypridd United	Carmarthen
14:00 BST	Evans 31' (pen.); Jenkins 35'	Report	Brown 72'	Stadium: LHP Stadium, Carmarthen; Referee: Neill Andrew Crawshaw

21 December 2025 Round 2	Wrexham	4–0	Penybont	Wrexham
14:00 BST	Snape 45'; Hughes 58'; Barker 66'; Clark 86'	Report		Stadium: The Rock, Rhosymedre; Referee: Morgan Griffiths

21 December 2025 Round 2	Cambrian United	0–7	The New Saints	Tonypandy
15:00 BST		Report	Buckland 14'; Webb 24'; Francis-Jones 28' 37'; Chapman 50'; Evans 78'; Baker 90'	Stadium: M&P Group 3G; Referee: Kris Hames

21 December 2025 Round 2	Cwmbran Celtic	5–1	Llantwit Fardre	Cwmbran
16:15 BST	Daniels 7'; Shipley 39' 47'; Cridland 52'; Anthony 82'	Report	Woodward 55'	Stadium: Llantarnam School 3G; Referee: Lee Smith

7 January 2026 Round 2	Cardiff City	14–0	Trefelin BGC	Cardiff
19:45 BST	Perrott 4' 44' 60'; Barry 26' 52' 71'; Curnock 39' 57' (pen.); Evans 63'; Long 67'; Olden 78' 89'; Cook 79' 84'	Report		Stadium: Cardiff International Sports Stadium; Referee: Charlotte Elizabeth Carpenter

11 January 2026 Round 2	Llandudno	3–1	Wrexham Foresters	Llandudno
14:00 BST	Haynes 12'; Whitefoot 45' 69'	Report	Churchill 8'	Stadium: Go Goodwins Stadium; Referee: Mark James

== Quarter-finals ==
The draw for the quarter-finals was held on 7 January 2026.

8 February 2026 Quarter-final	Swansea City	6–0	Llandudno	Neath
14:00 BST	Williams 11'; Miller 26'; Trivett 46' 57'; Mills 49' (o.g.); Murray 75'	Report		Stadium: Llandarcy Academy Of Sport; Referee: Benjamin Hyla Allan Williams

8 February 2026 Quarter-final	Cardiff City	3–0	The New Saints	Cardiff
14:00 BST	Price 3'; Jenkins 75'; Curnock 77'	Report		Stadium: Cardiff International Sports Stadium; Referee: Joseph Gibson

8 February 2026 Quarter-final	Carmarthen Town	0–5	Wrexham	Carmarthen
14:00 BST		Report	Knox 13' 90'; Barker 35'; Suckley 45' 67'	Stadium: LHP Stadium, Carmarthen; Referee: Gemma Amanda May Border

15 February 2026 Quarter-final	Cwmbran Celtic	1–0	Briton Ferry Llansawel	Cwmbran
14:00 BST	Anthony 36'	Report		Stadium: Cwmbran Stadium 3G; Referee: Sam Lloyd

== Semi-finals ==
The draw for the semi-finals was held on 9 February 2026.

8 March 2026 Semi-final	Swansea City	6–0	Cwmbran Celtic	Barry, Vale of Glamorgan
14:00 BST	John 20' 71'; Deacon 29' 41'; Trivett 51'; Richards 72'	Report		Stadium: Jenner Park Stadium; Referee: Jordan Harman

8 March 2026 Semi-final	Wrexham	1–2	Cardiff City	Aberystwyth
16:30 BST	Knox 90'	Report	Cook 70'; Bowen 78'	Stadium: Park Avenue, Aberystwyth; Referee: Conor Charlton-Fleming

== Final ==
19 April 2026 Final	Cardiff City	3–3 (5–4 p)	Swansea City	Newport, Wales
17:00 BST	Barry 65'; Evans 69'; Williams 81' (o.g.)	Report	Chivers 14'; Deacon 47'; Miller 49'	Stadium: Rodney Parade; Referee: Charlotte Elizabeth Carpenter
	Penalties
	Barry (penalty scored); Lloyd (penalty scored); Billingham (penalty scored); Cook (penalty scored); Bowen (penalty scored)		(penalty scored) Williams; (penalty scored) Chivers; (penalty missed) John; (penalty scored) Lake; (penalty scored) Turner
