= 2013–14 Welsh Premier Women's League =

Welsh Premier League (women)
- Season: 2013–14
- Champions: Cardiff Met. Ladies
- UEFA Women's Champions League: Cardiff Met. Ladies

The 2013–14 Welsh Premier League was the fifth season of the Women's Welsh Premier League, the top level women's football league in Wales.

Cardiff City were the defending champions having won their first championship last season. The season was won by Cardiff Met. Ladies.

During the winter break Northop Hall Girls withdrew from the league. All results including them were then wiped from the table.

== Changes from 2012–13 ==
- PILCS LFC replaced Caerphilly Castle who got relegated last season.
- Two instead of one team are relegated after the season.

== Clubs ==
Locations of teams in the 2012–13 Premier League

| Team | City | Ground |
|---|---|---|
| Aberystwyth Town Ladies | Aberystwyth | Park Avenue |
| Caernarfon Town Ladies | Caernarfon | The Oval |
| Cardiff City | Cardiff | Leckwith Stadium |
| Cardiff Met. Ladies | Cardiff | Cardiff University, Cyncoed Campus |
| Llandudno Junction Ladies | Llandudno Junction | The Flyover |
| Llanidloes Ladies | Llanidloes | Victoria Avenue |
| Newcastle Emlyn Ladies | Newcastle Emlyn | Parc Emlyn |
| Northop Hall Girls | Rhydymwyn | Dolfechlas Road, Rhydymwyn F.C. |
| PILCS LFC | Pontypool | |
| Port Talbot Town Ladies | Port Talbot | The Genquip Stadium |
| Swansea City Ladies | Port Talbot | Baglan Playing Fields |
| Wrexham Ladies | Wrexham | Colliers Road |

== Standings ==
| Pos | Team | Pld | W | D | L | GF | GA | GD | Pts | Qualification or relegation |
|---|---|---|---|---|---|---|---|---|---|---|
| 1 | Cardiff Met. Ladies | 20 | 18 | 1 | 1 | 110 | 12 | +98 | 55 | 2014–15 Champions League |
| 2 | PILCS LFC | 20 | 16 | 2 | 2 | 95 | 25 | +70 | 50 | |
| 3 | Cardiff City | 20 | 13 | 4 | 3 | 47 | 29 | +18 | 43 | |
| 4 | Swansea City Ladies | 20 | 11 | 4 | 5 | 56 | 21 | +35 | 37 | |
| 5 | Port Talbot Town Ladies | 20 | 7 | 4 | 9 | 34 | 49 | −15 | 25 | |
| 6 | Wrexham Ladies | 20 | 6 | 6 | 8 | 34 | 35 | −1 | 24 | |
| 7 | Llanidloes Ladies | 20 | 7 | 3 | 10 | 28 | 52 | −24 | 24 | |
| 8 | Newcastle Emlyn Ladies | 20 | 6 | 3 | 11 | 37 | 65 | −28 | 21 | |
| 9 | Llandudno Junction | 20 | 3 | 5 | 12 | 32 | 62 | −30 | 14 | |
| 10 | Caernarfon Town Ladies (R) | 20 | 4 | 1 | 15 | 31 | 106 | −75 | 10 (Note: Caernarfon had three points deducted for unfulfillment of fixture.) | |
| 11 | Aberystwyth Town Ladies (Note: Aberystwyth Town ended the season on a relegation place but were spared from relegation after Caernarfon withdraw for the next season.) | 20 | 2 | 1 | 17 | 15 | 63 | −48 | 7 | |
| 12 | Northop Hall Girls (R) | 0 | 0 | 0 | 0 | 0 | 0 | 0 | 0 (Note: Northop Hall Girls withdrew in the winter break because of a lack of players. They had lost all of their ten matches. All results were deleted from the table.) | |

Source: shekicks.net
(R) Relegated

== Results grid ==
| Home \ Away | ABE | CAE | CCI | CMT | JUN | LLL | NEW | PIL | PTT | SWA | WRE |
|---|---|---|---|---|---|---|---|---|---|---|---|
| Aberystwyth Town | | 1–0 | 0–3 | 1–2 | 1–1 | 0–1 | 1–4 | 0–4 | 1–2 | 1–5 | 1–2 |
| Caernarfon Town | 3–2 | | 1–7 | 0–5 | 4–6 | 3–0 | 3–2 | 2–3 | 5–2 | 0–5 | 2–5 |
| Cardiff City | 1–0 | 5–0 | | 0–5 | 1–1 | 1–3 | 2–0 | 2–0 | 3–1 | 0–0 | 2–1 |
| Cardiff Met. | 10–0 | 15–0 | 7–0 | | 4–0 | 9–0 | 2–0 | 1–3 | 6–0 | 2–1 | 4–0 |
| Llandudno Junction | 1–3 | 3–0 | 2–7 | 0–3 | | 1–3 | 5–0 | 0–5 | 1–3 | 0–5 | 0–2 |
| Llanidloes | 4–1 | 6–1 | 0–1 | 0–3 | 2–2 | | 3–1 | 0–2 | 1–1 | 0–1 | 1–1 |
| Newcastle Emlyn | 3–1 | 4–3 | 2–3 | 0–13 | 5–3 | 5–0 | | 0–12 | 1–2 | 0–1 | 2–2 |
| P.I.L.C.S. | 4–0 | 18–0 | 4–4 | 2–5 | 5–1 | 9–2 | 3–3 | | 4–1 | 4–1 | 3–1 |
| Port Talbot Town | 7–1 | 6–3 | 0–2 | 1–8 | 1–1 | 1–0 | 2–3 | 0–4 | | 0–3 | 2–0 |
| Swansea City | 2–0 | 11–0 | 1–1 | 1–3 | 5–1 | 8–0 | 1–1 | 1–4 | 1–1 | | 1–0 |
| Wrexham | 4–0 | 1–1 | 1–2 | 3–3 | 2–2 | 1–2 | 3–1 | 1–2 | 1–1 | 3–2 | |

Legend: Blue = home team win; Yellow = draw; Red = away team win.

== League Cup ==
2014–15 →

For the first time a League Cup was played. The new competition was introduced to further develop women's football. In the first round four teams (Port Talbot Town, Aberystwyth Town, Llanidloes Town and Newcastle Emlyn) were drawn to receive a bye to the second round. The final was played on 30 March 2014 on neutral ground at Port Talbot. Cardiff Met. won the title.

First round
| Cardiff Met | 4–1 | PILCS |
| Llandudno Junction | 0–1 | Caernarfon |
| Swansea City | 6–0 | Wrexham |
| Northop Hall | 1–8 | Cardiff City |
Quarter-finals
| Caernarfon Town | 0–2 | Llanidloes |
| Newcastle Emlyn | 1–4 | Cardiff Met |
| Cardiff City | 1–2 | Swansea City |
| Port Talbot | 3–0 | Aberystwyth Town |
Semi-finals
| Cardiff Met | 7–0 | Swansea City |
| Port Talbot Town | 0–1 | Llanidloes |
Final
| Cardiff Met | 1–0 | Llanidloes |
