= 2017–18 FAW Women's Cup =

Tournament details
- Country: Wales
- Teams: 36

Final positions
- Champions: Swansea City
- Runners-up: Cardiff City

Tournament statistics
- Matches played: 31
- Goals scored: 204 (6.58 per match)

The 2017–18 FAW Women's Cup is the 26th edition of the FAW Women's Cup, the premier knock-out cup competition for women's association football teams in Wales.

Swansea City won the final 2–1 over Cardiff City.

== Format ==
The tournament is a single-elimination knock-out tournament, with eight teams entering in the qualifying round and the remaining 28 receiving a bye to the first round proper.

== Calendar ==
Round	Main Date	Number of Fixtures	Clubs
Qualifying round	17 September 2017	4	36 → 32
First round	8 October 2017	16	32 → 16
Second round	12 November 2017	8	16 → 8
Quarter-finals	4 February 2018	4	8 → 4
Semi-finals	4 March 2018	2	4 → 2
Final	15 April 2018	1	2 → 1

== Results ==
=== Qualifying round ===
The draw for the qualifying round took place at the FAW's headquarters in Cardiff on 12 July. All four matches were originally scheduled to take place on Sunday 17 September 2017.

Tie	Date	Home team	Result	Away team
Northern section
1	1 October	Kinmel Bay	0–1	Bangor City
Southern section
2	17 September	Merthyr Town	5–0	Rhiwbina
3	17 September	Cwmbran Celtic	2–0	Splott Albion
4	1 October	Llangyfelach	H-W	Abertillery Belles

=== First round ===
The first round draw was held on 18 September, again at the FAW's headquarters in Cardiff. The ties were all played on Sunday 8 October 2017, except the Caerphilly Castle v Newcastle Emlyn and Abergavenny v Penybont games, which were both cancelled and the wins awarded to the home teams.

Tie	Date	Home team	Result	Away team
Northern section
1	8 October	Bethel	4–1	Caernarfon Town
2	8 October	Aberystwyth Town	0–1	Rhyl
3	8 October	Llanfair United	2–5	Llandudno
4	8 October	Northop Hall	14–0	Amlwch Town
5	8 October	Airbus	3–4 (a.e.t.)	Denbigh Town
6	8 October	Bangor City	4–2	Penrhyncoch
Southern section
7	8 October	AFC Tredegar	0–4	Llangyfelach
8	8 October	Abergavenny	W-O	Penybont
9	8 October	Dafen	1–4	Cardiff City
10	8 October	Cardiff Met	6–0	Cascade
11	8 October	Port Talbot Town	14–0	Aberdare
12	8 October	Barry Town United	5–0	Merthyr Town
13	8 October	Swansea City	15–0	AFC Porth
14	8 October	Caerphilly Castle	W-O	Newcastle Emlyn
15	8 October	Cyncoed Ladies	5–0	Briton Ferry Llansawel
16	8 October	Caldicot Town	6–2	Cwmbran Celtic

=== Second round ===
Drawn on 10 October.

Tie	Date	Home team	Result	Away team
Northern section
1	12 November	Northop Hall	4–1	Bethel
2	19 November	Denbigh Town	1–6	Rhyl
3	12 November	Bangor City	2–4	Llandudno
Southern section
4	12 November	Swansea City	H–W	Caldicot Town
5	12 November	Cyncoed Ladies	23–0	Llangyfelach
6	12 November	Abergavenny	11–0	Barry Town United
7	12 November	Port Talbot Town	11–1	Caerphilly Castle
8	12 November	Cardiff City	1–2	Cardiff Met

=== Quarter-finals ===
The draw was made on 13 November live on the FAW Facebook page.

Tie	Date	Home team	Result	Away team
1	4 February	Abergavenny	0–1	Cardiff Met
2	4 February	Northop Hall	0–7	Cyncoed Ladies
3	4 February	Llandudno	1–4	Swansea City
4	4 February	Port Talbot Town	3–1	Rhyl

=== Semi-finals ===
The draw was made on 5 February, with matches originally scheduled to be played on 4 March at neutral venues. Cardiff City and Abergavenny both were reinstated into the competition, having originally been eliminated by Cardiff Met in the second round and quarter-final respectively, after it had emerged that The Archers had fielded two under-aged players in the game against Cardiff City. City then beat Abergavenny in a replayed quarter final to take a place in the semi-finals.

4 March 2018
14:00 GMT (UTC±00:00)

Swansea City	5–1	Port Talbot Town
Stacey John-Davies 24', 59'; Jodie Passmore 34'; Sarah Adams 44'; Katy Hosford 49'	Report	Terri Beddows 58' (pen.)

Bryntirion Park, Bridgend
11 March 2018
14:00 GMT (UTC±00:00)

Cardiff City	1–0	Cyncoed Ladies
Alana Murphy 42'	Report

Rhiw'r Ddar, Taff's Well

== Final ==
15 April 2018
15:00 GMT (UTC±00:00)

Cardiff City	1–2	Swansea City
Alana Murphy 54'	Report	Jodie Passmore 64' (pen.); Katy Hosford 72'

Cardiff City Stadium
Attendance: 476
