= 2012–13 Welsh Premier Women's League =

Welsh Premier League (women)
- Season: 2012–13
- Champions: Cardiff City
- UEFA Women's Champions League: Cardiff City
- Matches: 110
- Goals: 521 (4.74 per match)
- Biggest home win: Cardiff City 11–1 Llandudno Junction
- Biggest away win: Caernarfon 0–16 Cardiff City

The 2012–13 Welsh Premier League was the fourth season of the Welsh Premier League (women), Wales' premier football league. It was the first season to feature a single division league. The season started on 16 September 2012 and ended on 19 May 2013.

After several high-scoring losses, including a 43–0 loss to Cardiff Met, Caerphilly Castle withdrew from the league after ten matches. All of their results were subsequently wiped from the table.

Cardiff City won the title for the first time, finishing ahead of reigning champions Cardiff Met on superior goal difference.

== Changes from 2011–12 ==
- The league expanded from 10 teams last season to 12 teams this season. The new teams are Llandudno Junction and Cardiff City.
- The league is not played in Northern and Southern conference any more, but a single division. The championship final is also abolished. The leading team after 22 matches is the champion.
- UWIC Ladies changed their name to Cardiff Met. Ladies F.C.
- Trefelin Ladies joined Port Talbot Town F.C. and now compete under their name.

== Clubs ==
Locations of teams in the 2012–13 Premier League

Team	City	Ground
Aberystwyth Town Ladies	Aberystwyth	Park Avenue
Caernarfon Town Ladies	Caernarfon	The Oval
Caerphilly Castle Ladies	Caerphilly	Owain Glyndwr Playing Fields
Cardiff Met. Ladies	Cardiff	Cardiff University, Cyncoed Campus
Llanidloes Ladies	Llanidloes	Victoria Avenue
Newcastle Emlyn Ladies	Newcastle Emlyn	Parc Emlyn
Northop Hall Girls	Rhydymwyn	Dolfechlas Road, Rhydymwyn F.C.
Swansea City Ladies	Port Talbot	Baglan Playing Fields
Port Talbot Town Ladies	Port Talbot	The Genquip Stadium
Wrexham Ladies	Wrexham	Colliers Road
Llandudno Junction Ladies	Llandudno Junction	The Flyover
Cardiff City	Cardiff	Leckwith Stadium

== Standings ==
Pos	Team	Pld	W	D	L	GF	GA	GD	Pts	Qualification or relegation
1	Cardiff City	20	19	0	1	92	12	+80	57	2013–14 Champions League
2	Cardiff Met. Ladies	20	19	0	1	81	11	+70	57	
3	Wrexham Ladies	20	13	2	5	67	27	+40	41	
4	Llanidloes Ladies	20	10	1	9	35	32	+3	31	
5	Swansea City Ladies	20	9	2	9	46	36	+10	29	
6	Port Talbot Town Ladies	20	8	2	10	46	47	−1	26	
7	Aberystwyth Town Ladies	20	8	2	10	38	46	−8	26	
8	Newcastle Emlyn Ladies	20	7	1	12	39	48	−9	22	
9	Llandudno Junction	20	4	1	15	23	80	−57	13	
10	Northop Hall Girls	20	4	0	16	30	89	−59	12	
11	Caernarfon Town Ladies	20	3	1	16	24	93	−69	4 (Note: Caernarfon Town Ladies had six points deducted for unfulfilment of Fixture.)	
12	Caerphilly Castle Ladies (R)	0	0	0	0	0	0	0	0	(Note: Caerphilly Castle withdrew after ten matches, totalling 0 points and 1–219 goals.)

Updated to match(es) played on 13 May 2013. Source: welshpremier.com, shekicks.net
Rules for classification: 1) points; 2) goal difference; 3) number of goals scored.
(R) Relegated

== Results ==
Newcastle Emlyn set a Premier League record win when they defeated Caerphilly Castle 36–0 on 12 January 2013. On that day Bethan Davies also set the record for most goals scored in a match with ten. Both records were later broken by Cardiff Met. Ladies, when then won 43–0 at Caerphilly Castle, with Emily Allen and Adele Hooper scoring 15 and 12 goals respectively. Those records are void now after the withdrawal of Caerphilly Castle.

Home \ Away	ATL	CTL	CCL	CC	CML	LJ	LL	NEL	NHG	SCL	PTT	WL
Aberystwyth Town Ladies		4–3	~~28–0~~	0–1	2–4	0–4	2–0	0–1	4–1	5–3	0–3	1–1
Caernarfon Town Ladies	1–4		n/a	0–16	0–5	6–1	0–7	1–8	5–1	0–4	0–0	0–7
Caerphilly Castle Ladies	n/a	~~1–14~~		n/a	~~0–43~~	n/a	n/a	n/a	~~0–5~~	n/a	~~0–21~~	~~0–10~~
Cardiff City	3–2	5–1	n/a		1–0	11–1	3–1	3–0	3–1	4–0	6–0	5–2
Cardiff Met. Ladies	3–0	6–0	~~18–0~~	1–0		8–1	3–1	8–0	7–1	3–1	7–0	1–0
Llandudno Junction	1–1	2–0	~~26–0~~	1–7	1–9		0–2	2–6	2–3	0–1	1–4	0–4
Llanidloes Ladies	2–3	1–0	n/a	0–5	1–2	0–1		1–0	4–1	2–1	2–1	0–1
Newcastle Emlyn Ladies	0–3	6–0	~~36–0~~	0–4	0–1	4–1	2–3		1–3	1–3	4–3	0–1
Northop Hall Girls	2–4	5–0	n/a	0–7	0–4	2–6	3–2	2–3		0–6	1–7	1–5
Swansea City Ladies	5–2	4–2	n/a	0–3	1–3	6–0	1–2	1–1	4–1		2–2	1–3
Port Talbot Town Ladies	4–0	3–5	~~18–0~~	2–3	1–4	2–1	0–1	2–1	7–1	0–1		4–2
Wrexham Ladies	4–1	4–0	n/a	0–2	0–2	6–0	3–3	6–1	11–3	2–1	5–1	

Legend: Blue = home team win; Yellow = draw; Red = away team win.
