= 2022–23 FAW Women's Cup =

Tournament details
- Country: Wales
- Teams: 44

Final positions
- Champions: Cardiff City
- Runners-up: Briton Ferry Llansawel

The 2022–23 FAW Women's Cup was the 29th edition of the FAW Women's Cup, the premier knock-out cup competition for women's association football teams in Wales.

== Format ==
The tournament is a single-elimination tournament, with 22 clubs in the qualifying round, and 22 joining in the first round proper.

== First Round ==
Home team	Result	Away team
16 September 2022
Llangefni	1–4	Amlwch Town
18 September 2022
NFA	2–1	Bangor 1876
Northop Hall	1–3	Pwllheli
Cardiff Wanderers	2–2 (5–4 on penalties)	Cwmbran Celtic
Carmarthen Town	1–0	Penybont
Lucas Cwmbran	0–6	Caerphilly Castle
Merthyr Town	10–0	Aberaman
Newport City	1–6	Llanelli Town
Tonyrefail Welfare	5–3	Coed Duon
Wattsville	1–3	Coedffranc

== Second Round ==
Home team	Result	Away team
9 October 2022
Aberdare Town	0–11	Llanelli Town
Abergavenny Town	3–1	Swansea University
Aberystwyth Town	H–W	Pwllheli
Amlwch Town	0–7	Llandudno Town
Barry Town	0–5	Pontypridd United
Briton Ferry Llansawel	16–0	Merthyr Town
Caerphilly Castle	0–9	Cardiff Met
Cardiff City	5–0	Cascade
Cardiff Wanderers	3–3 (3–2 p)	Caldicot
Carmarthen Town	2–1	Tonyrefail Welfare
Connah's Quay Nomads	6–2	Llanfair United
Pencoed Athletic	3–1	Pontardawe
Swansea City	16–0	Coedffranc
The New Saints	12–0	Airbus UK
Y Felinheli	1–5	Wrexham
Y Rhyl 1879	1–0	NFA

== Third Round ==
Home team	Result	Away team
30 October 2022
Llandudno Town	10–0	Y Rhyl 1879
The New Saints	1–2	Wrexham
Connah's Quay Nomads	0–2	Aberystwyth
Cardiff City	5–0	Pontypridd United
Abergavenny Town	3–1	Carmarthen Town
Briton Ferry Llansawel	9–1	Llanelli Town
Swansea City	0–0 (3–5 p)	Cardiff Met
Pencoed Athletic	1–4	Cardiff Wanderers

== Quarter Final ==
Home team	Result	Away team
11 December 2022
Cardiff Wanderers	1–5	Briton Ferry Llansawel
Cardiff City	6–0	Abergavenny Town
18 December 2022
Wrexham	1–3	Aberystwyth Town
9 January 2023
Cardiff Met	5–1	Llandudno Town

== Semi Final ==
Home team	Result	Away team
19 February 2023
Aberystwyth Town	0–3	Briton Ferry Llansawel
Cardiff Met	0–2	Cardiff City

== Final ==
Home team	Result	Away team
23 April 2023
Cardiff City	4–0	Briton Ferry Llansawel
