= 2026–27 FAW Women's Cup =

Tournament details
- Country: Wales
- Dates: 20 September 2026 – 11 April 2027

The 2026–27 FAW Women's Cup (also known as Bute Energy Welsh Cup for sponsorship reasons) is the 32nd edition of the FAW Women's Cup, the premier knock-out cup competition for women's association football teams in Wales.

== Qualifying round ==
=== Round 1 ===
20 September 2026 Round 1	Goytre (Gwent)	4–1	Cambrian United	Pontypool
14:00 BST	Daniels 19'; Davies 64'; Isaac 70'; Willavise 88'	Report	Isaac 66' (pen.)	Stadium: Plough Road; Referee: Glyn Charles Thomas

20 September 2026 Round 1	Undy	1–12	Cascade YC	Undy
14:00 BST	Leonard 34'	Report	Ware 8' 25' 90'; Owen 34'; Fletcher 40'; Moreton 45' 85'; Evan-Watkins 58'; Lunn 60' 70'; Beaman 60'; Jones 66'	Stadium: The Causeway; Referee: James Thomas Jennings

20 September 2026 Round 1	Ammanford	10–1	Caerphilly Dragons	Ammanford
14:00 BST	Rodde 13'; Ryzy 19' (o.g.); Heath 22' 44'; Evans 38' 45' 55' 57'; Ridd 80'; Owen 84'	Report	Williams 76'	Stadium: Ammanford Recreation Ground; Referee: Daniel Thomas Price

20 September 2026 Round 1	Hawarden Park	9–0	Amlwch Town	Deeside
14:00 BST	Weaver 4' 18' 21' 59'; Aslam 48' 61' 65' 83'; Williams 90' (o.g.)	Report		Stadium: Deeside Leisure Centre; Referee: Cory Wellbeloved

20 September 2026 Round 1	Wattsville	1–3	Canton Football Club	Newport
14:00 BST	Brown 38'	Report	Howell 33'; Jones 40' 87'	Stadium: Islwyn Road Wattsville; Referee: Daryl Leigh Jenkins

20 September 2026 Round 1	Clwb Pêl-droed Dinas Bangor City 1876 Football Club	1–1	Llangefni Town	Bangor
14:00 BST	Evans 72'	Report	Lowe 85'	Stadium: Bangor City Stadium; Referee: Byron Jones

20 September 2026 Round 1	AFC Llwydcoed	14–0	Ystradgynlais	Aberdare
14:00 BST	Weston 6' 31' 35' 57'; Jenkins 41'; Bailey 43'; Howells 44'; Kelleher 48' (o.g.); Prosser 60' (pen.) 86'; Thomas 68'; Butts 76' 80'; Smith 83'	Report		Stadium: ATLAS ARENA WELFARE GROUND; Referee: Ieuan Wynne

20 September 2026 Round 1	Towyn	2–3	Airbus UK Broughton
14:00 BST	Ash 5'; Aaron 60'	Report	Lewis 23' 40'; Roberts 36'	Referee: Paul Robert John Denton

20 September 2026 Round 1	Pure Swansea	v	Tregaron Turfs	Swansea
14:00 BST		Report		Stadium: Swansea University Sports Centre

20 September 2026 Round 1	Denbigh Town	6–7	NFA	Denbigh
14:00 BST	Williams 20'; Jones 40'; Kell 78' 90' (pen.); Bell 90' (pen.); Jones 90' (pen.)	Report	Brown 4' 90' (pen.); Webster 50'; Jones 81' 90' (pen.); Thomas 90' (pen.); Haywood 90' (pen.)	Stadium: Central Park; Referee: David Clive Davies

20 September 2026 Round 1	Llantwit Fardre	2–2	Porth Harlequins BGC	Pontypridd
14:00 BST	Howells 57'; Woodward 70'	Report	Mallin 45'; Lewis 48'	Stadium: Tonteg Park; Referee: Alisha Daily

20 September 2026 Round 1	Caernarfon Town	17–1	Prestatyn Sports	Bangor
14:00 BST	Williams 3' 16' 33' 50'; Connor 17'; Thomas 22' 40' 47' 53'; Bowness 71' 77' 90'; Swai 73'; Hughes 82' 84' 86' 90'	Report	Evans 57'	Stadium: Bangor University - Treborth Playing Fields; Referee: Benjamin Roberts

20 September 2026 Round 1	Sully Sports	2–4	Rockspur	Sully
14:00 BST	Bowen 45'; Green 88'	Report	Oduro-Sarfo 1' 55'; Davies 8' 80'	Stadium: Sully Sports & Social Club; Referee: Christopher Bowsher

20 September 2026 Round 1	Buckley Town	v	Llandudno	Buckley
14:00 BST		Report		Stadium: Buckley Town FC

20 September 2026 Round 1	Abertillery Bluebirds	1–4	Pontypridd	Blaenau Gwent
14:00 BST	Lewis 48'	Report	Jones 7'; Morgan 22' 53'; Lloyd 29'	Stadium: Abertillery Sports Centre 3G; Referee: Wayne Anthony Tregonning

20 September 2026 Round 1	Y Felinheli	5–8	Guilsfield	Y Felinheli
14:00 BST	Midwinter 33'; Edwards 47'; Williams 50'; Greenough 60'; Evans 70'	Report	Breese 10' 29' 67' 89'; Lawson 13' 27'; Foster 54'; Halfpenney 76'	Stadium: Cae Seilo; Referee: Ian Tuckk

20 September 2026 Round 1	Trefelin BGC	12–1	Skewen	Port Talbot
14:00 BST	Crosby 1'; Thomas 3' 22' 25' 41'; Roles 28'; Amor 38'; Adams 59'; Thomas 67' 84'; Rees 73'; Curran 76'	Report	Neill 36'	Stadium: Glenhafod Park Stadium; Referee: Kevin Delgado

20 September 2026 Round 1	CPD Pwllheli	6–0	Kinmel Bay	Pwllheli
14:00 BST	Thomas 2'; Hughes 3'; Moore 9' 21' 23'; Sansome 60'	Report		Stadium: The Rec Pwllheli

20 September 2026 Round 1	Rogerstone	1–4	Ponthir	Newport
14:00 BST	Kearns 55' (pen.)	Report	Sellers 10' 18' 43'; Boros 72'	Stadium: Rogerstone Welfare Ground; Referee: Joseph Gibson

20 September 2026 Round 1	Caerau Ely	1–5	Penydarren BGC	Cardiff
16:00 BST	Bates 63'	Report	Allen 28' 50' 65' 75'; Mullock 81'	Stadium: Cwrt yr Ala Road; Referee: Jason Lewis

27 September 2026 Round 1	Llanrumney United	9–0	Thornhill GU18 LADIES	Cardiff
14:00 BST	Hocking 5'; Hill 16'; Pole 32' 45'; Lane 44'; Newman 49' 72'; Wearmouth 65' 81'	Report		Stadium: The Jamie Burley Group Stadium; Referee: Leigh Carrick

=== Round 2 ===
18 October 2026 Round 2	Clwb Pêl-droed Dinas Bangor City 1876 Football Club	0–2	Connah's Quay Nomads	Bangor
14:00 BST		Report	Slack 32'; Galeandro 90'	Stadium: Bangor City Stadium; Referee: Adrian Wyn Williams

18 October 2026 Round 2	AFC Llwydcoed	3–5	Rockspur	Aberdare
14:00 BST	Smith 35'; Bailey 90' (pen.); Butts 90' (pen.)	Report	Morgan 90' (pen.); Hayward 90' (pen.); Nicholas 90' (pen.); Pitts 90' (pen.); Jones 90'	Stadium: ATLAS ARENA WELFARE GROUND; Referee: Glyn Charles Thomas

18 October 2026 Round 2	Llandudno	v	Llanfair United	Llandudno
14:00 BST		Report		Stadium: Go Goodwins Stadium

18 October 2026 Round 2	Caernarfon Town	1–5	Guilsfield	Bangor
14:00 BST	Bohana 81'	Report	Hodgson-Hughes 14' 31'; Pryce 75' 90'; Foster 79'	Stadium: Bangor University - Treborth Playing Fields; Referee: Mark Petch

18 October 2026 Round 2	Pontypridd United	7–0	Pontypridd	Pontypridd
14:00 BST	Bell 2' 31' 54' 70' 73' 88'; Medcraft 67'	Report		Stadium: USW Sports Park; Referee: Catrin Asbrey

18 October 2026 Round 2	Llantwit Fardre	v	Morriston Town	Pontypridd
14:00 BST		Report		Stadium: Tonteg Park

18 October 2026 Round 2	Canton Football Club	0–11	Llanrumney United	Cardiff
14:00 BST		Report	Pole 3'; Wearmouth 5' 75'; Kemp 11' 49'; Hocking 20' 90'; Newman 28' 51'; Jones 59'; Atkins 78'	Stadium: Fitzalan High School 3G; Referee: Robert Draper

18 October 2026 Round 2	Carmarthen Town	8–0	Ponthir	Carmarthen
14:00 BST	Williams 8'; Jenkins 12'; Guymer 13' 50'; Jenkins 22'; Walters 48'; Hayhurst 75' 87'	Report		Stadium: LHP Stadium, Carmarthen; Referee: Harry James King

18 October 2026 Round 2	Goytre (Gwent)	2–1	Trefelin BGC	Pontypool
14:00 BST	Willavise 39' (pen.) 75'	Report	Thomas 71'	Stadium: Plough Road; Referee: James Thomas Jennings

18 October 2026 Round 2	Berriew	2–2	CPD Pwllheli	Berriew
14:00 BST	Evans 65'; Richards 68'	Report	Moore 29'; Hughes 83'	Stadium: Berriew Recreation Ground; Referee: Susan Elizabeth Jones

18 October 2026 Round 2	Penybont	1–4	Cascade YC	Bridgend
14:00 BST	Clarke 73'	Report	Lunn 11'; Owen 14'; Jones 48'; Moreton 65'	Stadium: Dragonbet Stadium Bridgend; Referee: Zak Thomas

18 October 2026 Round 2	Wrexham Foresters	5–2	Hawarden Park	Wrexham
14:00 BST	Johnson 11'; Sayers 34'; Miles 54'; Smith 62'; Kural 74'	Report	Aslam 2'; Bates 78'	Stadium: Clywedog Park; Referee: Levi Roberts

18 October 2026 Round 2	Pure Swansea	0–1	Cwmbran Celtic	Swansea
14:00 BST		Report	Waite 51'	Stadium: Swansea University Sports Centre; Referee: Robert Fulford

18 October 2026 Round 2	Flint Town United	11–0	Airbus UK Broughton	Flint
14:00 BST	Hobbs 5' 18' 55'; Williams 9' 52'; Davies 28'; Riley 35' 50'; Hastings 79'; Eagles 86'; Hughes 90'	Report		Stadium: Essity Stadium; Referee: Karl Berry

18 October 2026 Round 2	Ammanford	8–0	Penydarren BGC	Ammanford
14:00 BST	Owen 7' 24'; Evans 17' 31' 43' 59' 63'; Heath 82'	Report		Stadium: Ammanford Recreation Ground; Referee: Alan Lloyd Jenkins

== Round 1 ==
The draw for Round One was held on 19 October 2026.

15 November 2026 Round 1	NFA	1–1	CPD Pwllheli	Rhyl
14:00 BST	Thomas 5' (pen.)	Report	Hughes 79'	Stadium: Ffordd Derwen Playing Fields; Referee: Jason Jenkins

15 November 2026 Round 1	Wrexham Foresters	1–0	Connah's Quay Nomads	Wrexham
14:00 BST	Thomas 36'	Report		Stadium: Stansty Park; Referee: Johnathan Paul Griffiths

15 November 2026 Round 1	Llantwit Fardre	7–0	Ammanford	Pontypridd
14:00 BST	Davies 2' 15' 36' 45'; Woodward 11'; Woodward 70' 83'	Report		Stadium: Tonteg Park; Referee: Alexander Jacklin

15 November 2026 Round 1	Rockspur	0–8	Llanfair United	Penlan
14:00 BST		Report	Schofield 26' 55' 81'; Wylde 58'; Whitehouse 62'; Davies 63' 69' 89'	Stadium: Penlan 3G (Cae Pen tawe); Referee: Kevin Delgado

15 November 2026 Round 1	Llanrumney United	0–2	Cascade YC	Cardiff
14:00 BST		Report	Lunn 14'; Fenton 31'	Stadium: The Jamie Burley Group Stadium; Referee: Richard Jeffries

15 November 2026 Round 1	Pontypridd United	0–3	Cwmbran Celtic	Pontypridd
18:00 BST		Report	Anthony 18'; Challenger 42'; Crofts 45'	Stadium: USW Sports Park; Referee: Erin Brennan

15 November 2026 Round 1	Flint Town United	v	Guilsfield	Flint
14:00 BST		Report		Stadium: Essity Stadium

22 November 2026 Round 1	Goytre (Gwent)	v	Carmarthen Town	Pontypool
14:00 BST		Report		Stadium: Plough Road

== Round 2 ==
The draw for Round Two was held on 16 November 2026.
