= 2014–15 Welsh Women's Cup =

2014–15 FAW Women's Cup
The Welsh Women's Cup

Tournament details
- Country: Wales
- Teams: 30

Final positions
- Champions: Swansea City
- Runner-up: Cardiff City

The 2014–15 FAW Women's Cup is the 23rd season of Wales' national women's association football knock-out competition. 30 teams took part in the competition. Cardiff Met. Ladies F.C. were the defending champions.

== Format ==
Play is a straight knock-out. First two rounds are drawn on a regional basis. Both finalists from last season receive a bye to the second round.

== Results ==
=== First round ===
Drawn on 21 August 2014. Played on 19 October 2014. Hafren United, Cambrian & Clydach, Llanyrafon Ladies and Caerphilly Castle withdraw.

Central
| Aberystwyth Town Ladies | 1–5 | Wrexham Ladies |
| Hafren United Ladies FC | w/o | Llanfair United Ladies |
North
| Caernarfon Town Women | 1–3 | Denbigh Town Ladies FC |
| Kinmel Bay Ladies | 6–0 | Prestatyn Town Ladies |
| Llandudno Ladies FC | 6–5 | Rhyl & Prestatyn Ladies |
South
| Briton Ferry Llansawel Ladies | 0–6 | Pontardawe Town Ladies FC |
| Camrose Ladies | 0–1 | Landore Colts Ladies |
| Cardiff City FC Women | 2–1 | Port Talbot Town Ladies |
| Cyncoed Ladies | 13–1 | Vale Ladies & Girls |
| Llanyrafon Ladies | w/o | Cwmbran Celtic Ladies FC |
| Merthyr Town Ladies FC | w/o | Cambrian & Clydach Ladies |
| Newcastle Emlyn Ladies | 6–0 | Dafen Welfare Ladies FC |
| Penybont Ladies | 1–4 | Pontypridd Town Ladies |
| PILCS Ladies FC | w/o | Caerphilly Castle Ladies & Girls |

=== Second round ===
Cardiff Met. and Swansea City are joined by 14 winners from the first round. Played 16 November 2014.

| Cardiff Met. Ladies F.C. | 5–0 | PILCS Ladies FC |
| Cwmbran Celtic Ladies FC | 1–5 | Swansea City |
| Cyncoed Ladies | 4–3 (a.e.t.) | Landore Colts Ladies |
| Kinmel Bay Ladies | 0–4 | Denbigh Town Ladies FC |
| Llanfair United Ladies | 1–5 | Llandudno Ladies FC |
| Merthyr Town Ladies FC | 0–7 | Cardiff City FC Women |
| Pontardawe Town Ladies FC | 2–5 | Pontypridd Town Ladies |
| Wrexham Ladies | 3–0 | Newcastle Emlyn Ladies |

=== Quarter-finals ===
Played on 15 February 2015. Three non Premier League teams remain, Denbigh, Cyncoed and Pontypridd.

| Cardiff City | 5–0 | Denbigh Town Ladies |
| Llandudno Ladies | 1–3 a.e.t. | Cyncoed Ladies |
| Wrexham Ladies | 3–2 a.e.t. | Pontypridd Town Ladies |
| Swansea City | 1–0 | Cardiff Met. |

=== Semi-finals ===
Draw held on 16 February 2015. Games will be played at a neutral venue on 22 March 2015.

| Wrexham Ladies | 1–4 a.e.t. | Cardiff City |
| Swansea City | 5–0 | Cyncoed Ladies |

=== Final ===
19 April 2015
17:30

| Cardiff City | 2–4 | Swansea City |
|---|---|---|
| Maria Martins 25'; Lisa Bird 66' | | Katy Hosford 14'; Sarah Adams 43', 87'; Katy Hosford 43' |

Bryntirion Park, Bridgend
