= 2021–22 Adran Trophy =

Tournament details
- Country: Wales

Final positions
- Champions: Cardiff Met
- Runner-up: Cardiff City

The 2021–22 Adran Trophy (also known as Genero Adran Trophy for sponsorship reasons) was the 8th edition of the Adran Trophy (formerly known as the Welsh Premier Women's League Cup), a knock-out cup competition for women's association football teams in Wales.

== Round of 16 ==
Home team	Result	Away team
19 December 2021
Aberystwyth Town	2–0	Briton Ferry Llansawel
Caldicot Town	1–3	Barry Town United
Port Talbot Town	1–0	Cascade YC
The New Saints	4–0	Connahs Quay Nomads
Wrexham	0–6	Swansea City
16 January 2021
Cardiff Met	8–0	Llandudno
Pontypridd United	2–2 (3–5 p)	Abergavenny
Pwllheli	0–3	Cardiff City

== Quarterfinals ==
Home team	Result	Away team
30 January 2022
Abergavenny	0–0 (4–2 p)	Aberystwyth Town
Cardiff City	4–1	Barry Town United
Cardiff Met	1–1 (3–2 p)	Swansea City
6 February 2022
The New Saints	walkover	Port Talbot Town

== Semi-finals ==
Home team	Result	Away team
30 January 2022
Aberystwyth Town	0–5	Cardiff City
The New Saints	2–3	Cardiff Met

== Final ==
27 March 2022
Final

Cardiff City	0–1	Cardiff Met
		Allen 89'

Dragon Park, Newport
