= 2022–23 Adran Premier =

Welsh women's 1st tier association football season

Adran Premier
- Season: 2022–23
- Dates: 4 September 2022 – 9 April 2023
- Champions: Cardiff City
- Relegated: Abergavenny Town
- Matches: 80
- Goals: 304 (3.8 per match)
- Top goalscorer: Stacey John-Davis (15 goals)
- Biggest home win: Cardiff City Women 9–0 Abergavenny Women (16 November 2022); Cardiff City Women 9–0 Cardiff Met (19 March 2023)
- Biggest away win: Barry Town United Women 1–8 Cardiff Met (22 January 2023)
- Highest scoring: Cardiff City Women 9–0 Abergavenny Women (16 November 2022); Barry Town United Women 1–8 Cardiff Met (22 January 2023); Cardiff City Women 9–0 Cardiff Met (19 March 2023)
- Longest winning run: Cardiff City Women (6 games)
- Longest unbeaten run: Cardiff City Women (20 games)
- Longest winless run: Abergavenny Women (12 games)
- Longest losing run: Abergavenny Women (10 games)
- Highest attendance: 5,175; Cardiff City Women 9–0 Abergavenny Women (16 November 2022)
- All statistics correct as of 26 February 2023.

The 2022–23 Adran Premier season (also known as Genero Adran Premier for sponsorship reasons), was the second edition of the Adran Premier, the highest level of league competition for women's football in Wales, and the fourteenth season of top-flight women's football in Wales overall. The competition began on 4 September 2022.

== Teams ==
Locations of teams in the 2022–23 Adran Premier

Club	City	Ground
Abergavenny Women	Abergavenny	Pen-Y-Pound Stadium
Aberystwyth Town Women's	Aberystwyth	Park Avenue
Barry Town United Women	Barry	Jenner Park
Cardiff City Women	Cardiff	Cardiff International Sports Stadium
Cardiff Met WFC	Cardiff	Cardiff Met Cyncoed Campus
Pontypridd United Women	Pontypridd	UWS Sports Park
Swansea City Ladies	Neath	Llandarcy Academy of Sport
The New Saints FC Women	Oswestry	Park Hall

== League table ==
Pos	Team	Pld	W	D	L	GF	GA	GD	Pts	Qualification (Note: Teams play each other twice (14 matches), before the league is split into two groups (the top four and the bottom four).)
1	Cardiff City (C)	20	17	3	0	70	12	+58	54	Qualification for the UEFA Women's Champions League first round
2	Swansea City	20	12	5	3	52	20	+32	41	
3	Cardiff Metropolitan University	20	9	2	9	38	43	−5	29	
4	The New Saints	20	8	2	10	43	50	−7	26	
5	Pontypridd United	20	9	4	7	35	27	+8	31	
6	Aberystwyth Town	20	7	3	10	31	37	−6	24	
7	Barry Town United	20	4	3	13	21	52	−31	15	
8	Abergavenny Town (R)	20	2	2	16	14	63	−49	8	Relegation to Adran South

Source: Adran Leagues
Rules for classification: 1) Points; 2) Goal difference; 3) Head-to-head points; 4) Goals scored; 5) Matches won.
(C) Champions; (R) Relegated

== Results ==
=== Matches 1–14 ===
Teams play each other twice, once at home and once away.

Home \ Away	ABT	ABE	BAR	CAR	CMU	PNT	SWA	TNS
Abergavenny Town	—	1–2	2–3	0–5	1–3	1–0	1–3	2–4
Aberystwyth Town	4–1	—	5–1	1–5	0–4	1–2	2–2	3–3
Barry Town United	3–3	1–0	—	0–3	1–8	0–3	0–6	2–3
Cardiff City	9–0	1–0	1–0	—	3–1	2–0	2–0	3–2
Cardiff Metropolitan University	0–0	4–0	3–1	0–5	—	1–0	1–1	3–0
Pontypridd United	3–0	2–1	6–1	1–1	3–4	—	0–2	0–4
Swansea City	5–0	2–2	1–0	1–1	2–0	4–0	—	5–2
The New Saints	4–0	3–0	1–3	1–5	1–2	2–2	1–3	—

Source: Adran League
Legend: Blue = home team win; Yellow = draw; Red = away team win.

=== Matches 15–20 ===
After fourteen matches, the league splits into two sections of four teams (i.e. the top four and the bottom four), with the teams playing every other team in their section twice (once at home and once away). The exact matches are determined by the position of the teams in the league table at the time of the split.

==== Championship (top four) ====
Home \ Away	CAR	CMU	SWA	TNS
Cardiff City	—	9–0	3–1	3–1
Cardiff Metropolitan University	0–2	—	0–4	4–5
Swansea City	2–2	3–0	—	4–1
The New Saints	1–5	2–0	2–1	—

Source: Adran League
Legend: Blue = home team win; Yellow = draw; Red = away team win.

==== Plate (bottom four) ====
Home \ Away	ABT	ABE	BAR	PNT
Abergavenny Town	—	0–1	0–4	1–5
Aberystwyth Town	3–0	—	3–0	1–2
Barry Town United	0–1	0–2	—	1–1
Pontypridd United	2–0	3–0	0–0	—

Source: Adran League
Legend: Blue = home team win; Yellow = draw; Red = away team win.
