= Alice Griffiths =

Welsh association football player (born 2001)

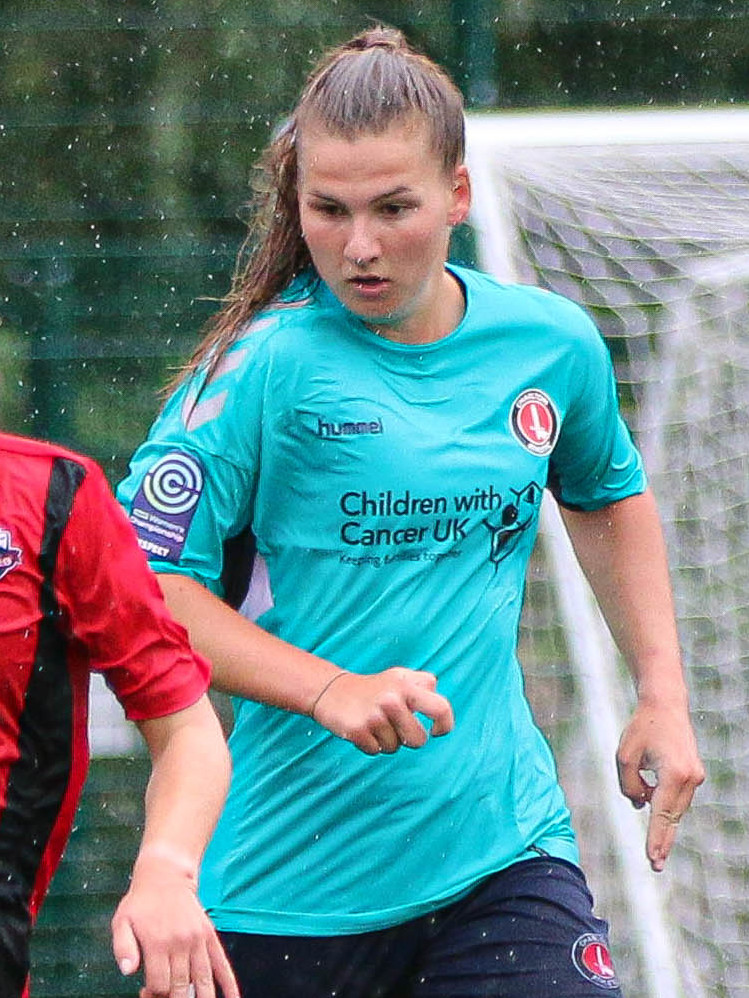
- Griffiths playing for Charlton Athletic in 2020

Personal information
- Full name: Alice Griffiths
- Date of birth: 22 January 2001 (age 25)
- Place of birth: Aberdare, Wales
- Position: Midfielder

Youth career
- Llwydcoed

Senior career*
Years	Team	Apps	(Gls)
2017–2018	Cyncoed Ladies		
2018–2019	Cardiff Met. Ladies	16	(3)
2019–2021	Charlton Athletic	26	(0)
2021–2025	Southampton	58	(0)
2025	→ Durham (loan)	6	(0)
2025–2026	Rangers	7	(1)
2026	Exeter City	4	(0)
Total		102+	(4+)

International career
2016–2017	Wales U17	12	(1)
2018–2019	Wales U19	4	(1)
2017–2025	Wales	16	(0)
- * Club domestic league appearances and goals

Alice Griffiths (born 22 January 2001) is a Welsh former professional footballer. She represented the Wales national team and played for Cardiff Met. Ladies, Charlton Athletic, Southampton, Durham, Rangers, and Exeter City.

== Early life ==
Griffiths was born and raised in Aberdare, Rhondda Cynon Taf. She attended St John the Baptist School. She has an older sister, Anna, who is also a footballer and has represented Wales at youth level. Her father, Nigel, has described Alice as "a very shy and quiet girl, but give her a pair of football boots and she thrives."

== Club career ==
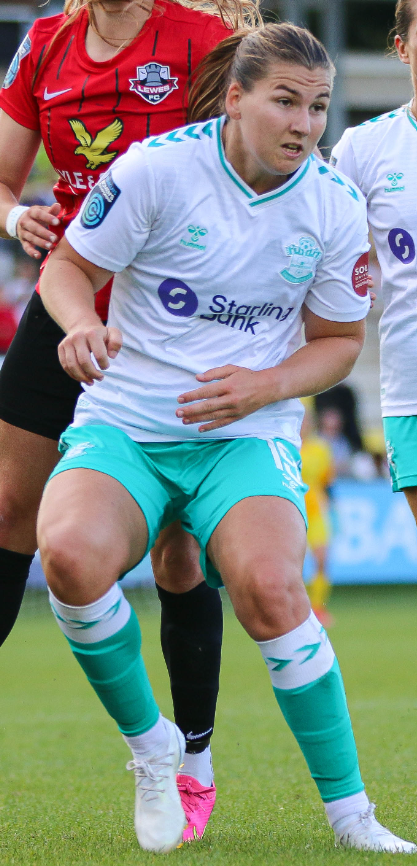
Griffiths playing for Southampton in August 2023

Griffiths began playing football with local amateur side Aberdare Grasshoppers, before moving to Cardiff City Ladies. She also played for Llwydcoed AFC in the Aberdare and Rhondda Junior Football League. At under-16 level, she was the only female player in an otherwise all-boys league. She joined Welsh Premier Women's Football League side Cyncoed Ladies in 2017 and was named the League's Young Player of the Year during her first season.

In 2018, she joined fellow Welsh Premier side Cardiff Met Ladies. During the 2018–19 season, Griffiths helped the side win a domestic treble, winning the league title, the FAW Women's Cup and the Welsh Premier Women's Cup.

In July 2019, Griffiths moved to England and signed with FA Women's Championship team Charlton Athletic.

Griffiths joined Southampton for the 2021-22 season, helping them win promotion for the first time to the Women's Championship in her first season at the club. In her time at Southampton, Griffiths made a total of 62 appearances for the Saints, scoring one goal.

On 30 January 2025, transfer deadline day, Griffiths moved on loan to Durham for the remainder of the 2024-25 Women's Championship season.

On 17 May 2025 it was announced that Griffiths would depart Southampton upon the expiry of her contract at the end of the 2024-25 season.

On 27 July 2025, Griffiths joined Scottish Women's Premier League side Rangers on a free transfer.

On 1 April 2026, it was announced that Griffiths had signed for Exeter City in the Women's National League South, making her debut for the club as a substitute against Real Bedford.

Aged 25, Griffiths announced her retirement from professional football on 11 May 2026, writing on social media that she "gave it absolutely everything and sometimes it's okay to say it's just not what I want anymore."

== International career ==
In 2014, Griffiths was named in a Wales under-16 training camp squad as the youngest member of the team, being two years under the age group level. Two years later she was called up to the under-17 team at the age of 15 after impressing in an otherwise all-boys league.

Griffiths was called up to the Wales senior squad in 2017. She made her debut in Cymru's 1–0 victory over Kazakhstan in a 2019 FIFA Women's World Cup qualification round.

She was recalled to the squad towards the end of Gemma Grainger’s reign as manager after a period away. Under Rhian Wilkinson, Griffiths featured regularly and started the EURO second leg semi-final play-off against Slovakia.

In June 2025, Griffiths was named in Wales' squad for UEFA Women's Euro 2025.

== Career statistics ==
=== Club ===
Some entries may be missing or incomplete due to lack of historical statistics.

Appearances and goals by club, season and competition
Club	Season	League			National cup		League cup		Total	
Club	Season	Division	Apps	Goals	Apps	Goals	Apps	Goals	Apps	Goals
Cyncoed Ladies	2016–17	Welsh Premier Women's Football League								
Cyncoed Ladies	2017–18	Welsh Premier Women's Football League								
Cardiff Met. Ladies	2018–19	Welsh Premier Women's Football League	16	3						
Cardiff Met. Ladies	Total		16+	3+						
Charlton Athletic	2019–20	Women's Championship	7	0		0		0		0
Charlton Athletic	2020–21	Women's Championship	19	0	2	0	2	0	23	0
Charlton Athletic	Total		26	0	2+	0	2	0	23+	0+
Southampton	2021–22	FA Women's National League South	10	0		0	—		10+	0+
Southampton	2022–23	Women's Championship	21	0	0	0	3	0	24	0
Southampton	2023–24	Women's Championship	12	0	1	0	2	0	15	0
Southampton	2024–25	Women's Championship	9	0	3	0	0	0	12	0
Durham (loan)	2024–25	Women's Championship	6	0	—		—		6	0
Durham (loan)	Total		58+	0	4	0	5	0	67+	3+
Rangers	2025–26	Scottish Women's Premier League	7	1	1	0	0	0	8	1
Exeter City	2025–26	FA Women's National League South	4	0	—		—		4	0
Exeter City	Total		11	1	1	0	0	0	12	1
Career total			111+	4+	7+	0	7+	0	102+	4+

=== International ===
Appearances and goals by national team and year
National team	Year	Apps	Goals
Wales	2017	2	0
Wales	2018	4	0
Wales	2024	7	0
Wales	2025	3	0
Total		16	0

== Honours ==
Cardiff Met. Ladies

- FAW Women's Cup winner: 2018–19

Individual

- Welsh Premier Women's Football League Young Player of the Year: 2017–18
