= Jassie Vasconcelos =

Portuguese footballer

Personal information
- Full name: Josiane Catarina Vasconcelos Costa
- Date of birth: 20 June 1994 (age 32)
- Place of birth: Paranhos, Portugal
- Positions: Defender; midfielder

Youth career
- Clube Fatigados (futsal)

Senior career*
Years	Team	Apps	(Gls)
2015–2016	PILCS		
2016–2017	Cardiff Met.		
2017–2018	Cardiff City		
2018–2019	Benfica	17	(31)
2019–2020	Metz	9	(0)
2020–2021	Benfica	0	(0)

International career^{‡}
2017–	Portugal	1	(0)
- * Club domestic league appearances and goals as of 1 February 2020 ‡ National team caps and goals as of 24 December 2018

Josiane Catarina "Jassie" Vasconcelos Costa (born 20 June 1994) is a Portuguese professional footballer who plays as a defender for the Portugal women's national team.

== Club career ==
Vasconcelos played futsal as a child, before switching to handball as a 12-year-old. When her parents separated she moved to Wales in 2015 to live with her mother. She then joined Welsh Premier Women's Football League PILCS and moved on to UEFA Women's Champions League contestant Cardiff Met. Ladies in 2016. For the 2017–18 season she moved on to Cardiff City, who played in the English league system.

In February 2018 S.L. Benfica announced Vasconcelos' signing to their team for their debut season in the 2018–19 Campeonato Nacional de Promoção. Vasconcelos spoke of her pride and described Benfica's kit as a "sacred mantle".

Vasconcelos announced a transfer to French Division 1 Féminine club FC Metz in June 2019, by which time she had scored 36 goals in 19 games for Benfica, across all competitions.

== International career ==
Vasconcelos was named by coach Francisco Neto in the Portugal national team for the first time in September 2017, for two friendlies against Finland.

== Honours ==
Benfica

- Campeonato Nacional Feminino: 2020–21
- Campeonato Nacional II Divisão Feminino: 2018–19
- Taça de Portugal: 2018–19
