= Dragon Park =

Football venue in Newport, Wales

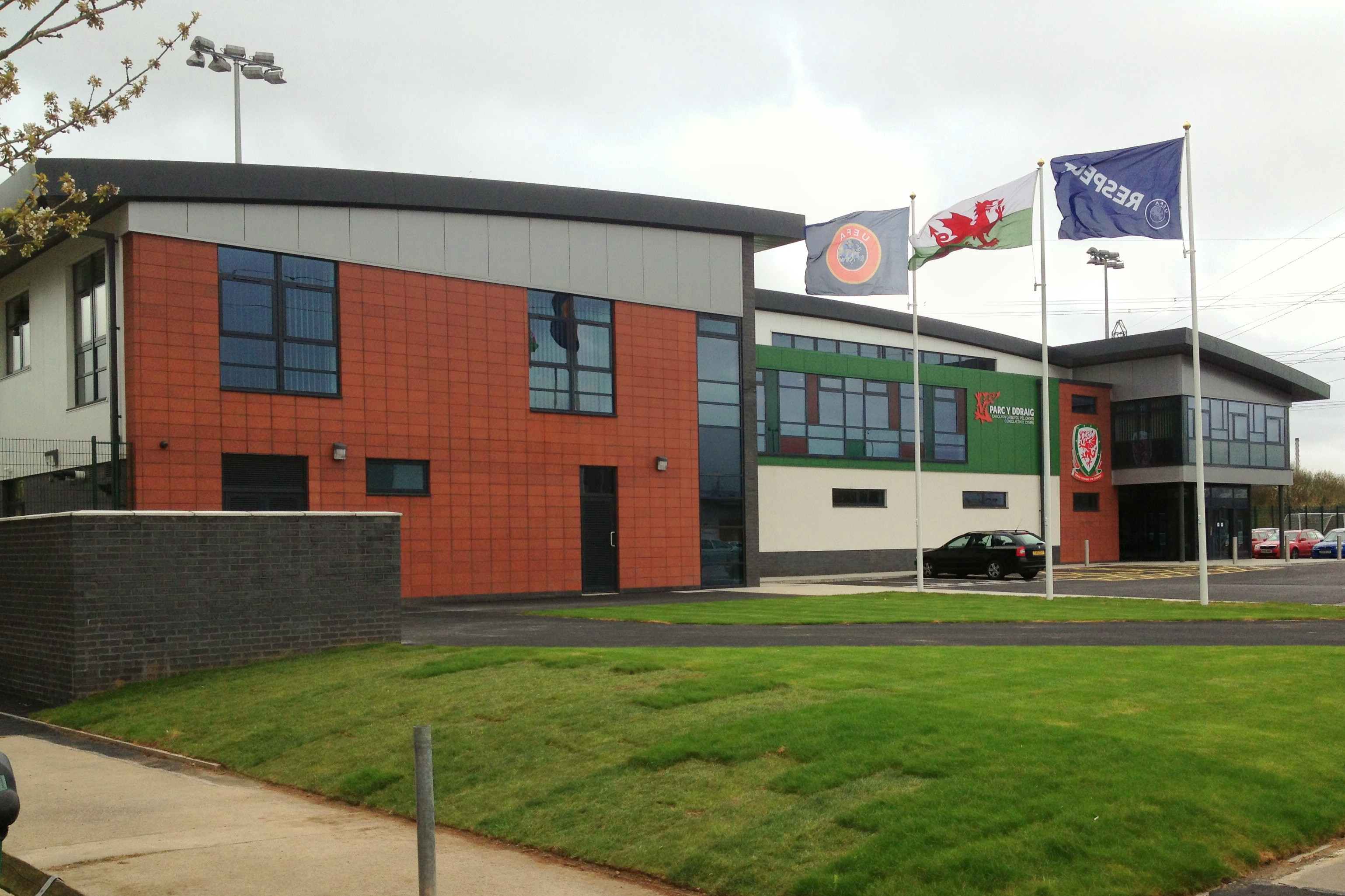
- Dragon Park, Wales National Football Development Centre
- Interactive map of Dragon Park
- Coordinates: 51.570193°N 2.958969°W

Construction
- Opened: April 20, 2013
- Cost: £5m

Dragon Park (Welsh: Parc y Ddraig) is the Wales National Football Development Centre in the city of Newport, South Wales.

The centre is located at the Newport International Sports Village, Lliswerry in the east of Newport near Newport Stadium and the Wales National Velodrome. It was officially opened 20 April 2013 by Michel Platini, President of UEFA. The £5M complex was a joint venture between UEFA, the Football Association of Wales, Sport Wales and Newport City Council.

The Centre is intended to develop the Wales under-21, Wales women's and younger age-group squads. The centre includes two grass pitches and one artificial turf pitch. The centre also provides headquarters for the Welsh Football Trust, the game's development body, with analysis suites, sports science laboratories and coach education facilities.

== See also ==
- Wales national football team
