= Briton Ferry Llansawel A.F.C. Ladies =

Coordinates: 51°38′31.7″N 3°48′49″W

Briton Ferry Llansawel AFC Ladies
- Full name: Briton Ferry Llansawel Athletic Football Club
- Nickname: The Ferry
- Founded: 2013
- Ground: Old Road Ground, Briton Ferry
- Capacity: 2,000
- League: Adran Premier
- 2025–26: Adran Premier, 5th of 8
- Website: www.britonferryllansawelafc.com
Home colours	Away colours

Briton Ferry Llansawel AFC Ladies is a football team, playing in the Women's Welsh Premier League, to which they were promoted in 2024. Briton Ferry Llansawel run a senior ladies team, a ladies reserves team and a ladies youth team.

The club plays its home matches at Old Road Ground, Briton Ferry, which has a capacity of 2,000.

The team's first choice strip is red shirts, shorts and socks. The second choice strip is green shirts with white stripe, black shorts and socks.

== History ==
After Briton Ferry and Llansawel Football Clubs merged to form Briton Ferry Llansawel AFC in 2009, the ladies team was later set up and began playing in the South Wales regional leagues, finishing in the top three in the 2013-14 season. They played their first season in the Women's Welsh Premier League in 2016, however they finished bottom of the league after the 18 game season and were relegated back to the second tier. After winning the Welsh Women's League in the 2017-18 season to gain promotion back to the Premier League with a last day of the season win away to Barry Town, Briton Ferry Llansawel.

=== Demotion to the Adran South ===
Despite successfully earning a tier 1 license, and finishing 7th out of 9th in the previous season's Welsh Women's Premier League, Briton Ferry Llansawel were demoted to the second tier.

Briton Ferry Llansawel's General Manager, Ross Norgrove condemned the demotion as "unfair and discriminatory"

In the 2021-22 season; their first back in the second tier, Briton Ferry Llansawel finished in the runners up spot. They went won better the following season, winning the Adran South, but losing out to Wrexham in the North-South promotion playoff. Ferry also reached the FAW Women's Cup final, losing to Cardiff City.

In then 2023-24, however, they finally won the promotion back to the top flight, beating Llandudno 4 - 0 in the promotion playoff final.

== Club staff ==
Club Staff
Position	Staff
General Manager	Ross Norgrove
Media Officer	Tom Knight
Digital Communications	LINDSEY BROWN

1st Team Coaching Staff
Position	Staff
Assistant manager	SIMON POWELL
1st Team Assistant Manager	RHYS JAMES
First-team coach	BEN GORVETT
Head goalkeeping coach	ROB BROWN

Development Staff
Position	Staff
Head of Youth Development	SIMON POWELL
Goalkeeping coach	DAVID PUGH
Under 19's Head Coach	FINN HARRIS
Development Squad Head Coach	FINN HARRIS
Under 16's Head Coach	Richard Jones

Technical Staff
Position	Staff
Club Doctor	TBC
Physiotherapist	Lydia Thomas
S&C Coach	Dafydd Rotie Samuel Thomas
Performance analysis	STEPHEN HANDLY

== Former staff ==
Position	Staff	Duration
Manager	Ross Norgrove	June 2013 - June 2020
Manager	Andy Jones	July 2020 - October 2020

== Sponsorship ==
Kit Sponsors

Period	Kit Manufacture	Kit	Shirt sponsor (Chest)	Shirt sponsor (Back)	Shorts	Warm up
2013-14	Macron	Home	McDonalds	Macron Store Neath		
2013-16	Adidas	Away	Mail online	Pro direct		McDonalds Briton Ferry
2014-15	Macron	Home	Happy Home Furnitures	Macron Store Neath		McDonalds Briton Ferry
2015-17	Macron	Away	Mark Jones Financial	Macron Store Neath		McDonalds Briton Ferry
2015-17	Macron	Home	Mark Jones Financial	Macron Store Neath		McDonalds Briton Ferry
2017-19	Macron	Home	CMB	Macron Store Neath		McDonalds Briton Ferry
2019-21	Macron	Home	Synergy Heating	Macron Store Neath		Wales & West Utilities
2019-21	Macron	Away	Setech	Macron Store Neath		Macron Store Neath
2021-23	Macron	Home	Westward Energy	Bespoke Education Service Team	Megan Mai Foundation	Macron Store Neath
2021-23	Macron	Away	Westward Energy	Browns of Neath	Megan Mai Foundation	Macron Store Neath

Players Sponsors
