= FAW Women's Cup =

Association football competition in Wales

- Founded: 1992; 34 years ago
- Region: Wales
- Teams: 30
- Current champions: Cardiff City Women
- Most championships: Cardiff City Ladies (11 titles)
- 2026–27 FAW Women's Cup

The FA of Wales Women's Challenge Cup, better known as the Welsh Women's Cup is the national women's football cup competition for Wales. It is run by the Football Association of Wales.

As Wales had no national league for women until the establishment of the Welsh Premier League in the 2009–10 season the Welsh Cup was the only ticket to the Women's Champions League. Unlike in the men's game, however, English-oriented clubs are allowed to participate. Cardiff City Ladies won eight consecutive cups from 2003 to 2010.

== Possible reform ==
Following a number of high scoring, one sided matches in the opening round of the 2012–13 competition, the league's unofficial website called on the FAW to consider revamping the competition to avoid such embarrassing results in future seasons and encourage greater lower league participation.

== Winners ==
The list of finals:

Season	Winner	Score	Runner-up	Venue
1992–93	Pilkington (Rhyl)	1–0	Inter Cardiff Ladies	National Stadium, Cardiff
1993–94	Pilkington (Rhyl)	2–2 (4–2 pen)	Inter Cardiff Ladies	National Stadium, Cardiff
1994–95	Inter Cardiff Ladies	1–1 (4–3 pen)	Bangor City Girls	National Stadium, Cardiff
1995–96	Newport Strikers Ladies	1–0 a.e.t	Bangor City Girls	Racecourse Ground, Wrexham
1996–97	Bangor City Girls	3–0	Newcastle Emlyn Ladies	Park Avenue, Aberystwyth
1997–98	Barry Town Ladies	3–0	Bangor City Girls	Y Weirglodd, Rhayader
1998–99	Barry Town Ladies	3–0	Newport Strikers Ladies	Bridge Meadow Stadium, Haverfordwest
1999–2000	Barry Town Ladies	2–2 (3–0 pen)	Bangor City Girls	Recreation Ground (Caersws), Caersws
2000–01	Barry Town Ladies	3–0	Newport Strikers Ladies	Latham Park, Newtown
2001–02	Bangor City Girls	3–0	Newport County Ladies	
2002–03	Cardiff City Ladies	1–0	Bangor City Girls	
2003–04	Cardiff City Ladies	4–0	Newtown Ladies	
2004–05	Cardiff City Ladies	4–1	Cardiff City Bluebirds Ladies	
2005–06	Cardiff City Ladies	11–0	Pwllheli Ladies	
2006–07	Cardiff City Ladies	6–1	Caernarfon Town Ladies	
2007–08	Cardiff City Ladies	9–0	NEWI Wrexham Ladies	
2008–09	Cardiff City Ladies	3–0	Caerphilly Castle Ladies	
2009–10	Cardiff City Ladies	6–0	UWIC Ladies	Brewery Field, Bridgend
2010–11	Swansea City Ladies	3–0	Caernarfon Town Ladies	Park Avenue, Aberystwyth
2011–12	Cardiff City Ladies	1–1 (4–2 pen)	UWIC Ladies	Brewery Field, Bridgend
2012–13	Cardiff City Ladies	3–1	Cardiff Met. Ladies F.C.	Parc y Scarlets, Llanelli
2013–14	Cardiff Met. Ladies F.C.	4–0	Swansea City Ladies	Stebonheath Park, Llanelli
2014–15	Swansea City Ladies	4–2	Cardiff City F.C. (Women)	Bryntirion Park, Bridgend
2015–16	Cardiff City F.C. (Women)	5–2	MBi Llandudno	Latham Park, Newtown
2016–17	Cardiff Met. Ladies F.C.	2–2 a.e.t. (5–4 pen)	Swansea City Ladies	Bryntirion Park, Bridgend
2017–18	Swansea City	2–1	Cardiff City F.C. (women)	Cardiff City Stadium, Cardiff
2018–19	Cardiff Met Women	2–0	Abergavenny Women	Dragon Park, Newport
2019–20	Cancelled due to the COVID-19 pandemic.			
2020–21	Cancelled due to the COVID-19 pandemic.			
2021–22	Cardiff City F.C.	2–0	Cardiff Met Women	Bryntirion Park, Bridgend
2022–23	Cardiff City F.C.	4–0	Briton Ferry Llansawel	Merthyr Town FC stadium
2023–24	Cardiff City F.C.	2–0	Wrexham A.F.C. Women	Rodney Parade, Newport, Wales
2024–25	Cardiff City F.C.	3–1	Wrexham A.F.C. Women	Rodney Parade, Newport, Wales
2025–26	Cardiff City F.C.	3–3	Swansea City Ladies F.C.	Rodney Parade, Newport, Wales
