= Cyncoed Ladies F.C. =

- Full name: Cyncoed Ladies Football Club
- Nickname(s): Mighty Oaks
- Founded: 2007; 18 years ago
- Dissolved: 2021; 4 years ago
- Ground: USW Sports Park, Treforest
- League: Welsh Premier League
- 2019–20: 5th
Home colours	Away colours

Cyncoed Ladies Football Club were an association football club based at USW Sports Park, Pontypridd, Wales. They played in the Welsh Premier Women's Football League, the highest level of football in Wales. Their kit was a red shirt, black shorts and red socks. In 2021 the club merged with Pontypridd United.

The team were formed in 2007, originally playing under the name 'Cardiff Draconians' before becoming Cyncoed Ladies Football Club in 2008. Their best ever run in the FAW Women's Cup came in the 2017–18 season where they reached the semi-final before bowing out narrowly to Cardiff City. En route they defeated Llangyfelach 23–0 in the second round.

== Top flight record ==
Cyncoed Ladies played their first season in the Premier League in 2015–16, finishing in 8th position and reaching the quarter-finals of the Welsh Women's Cup.

The 2017–18 season was Cyncoed Ladies’ most successful, finishing 4th in the Premier League and winning the Welsh Premier League Cup over league winners Cardiff Met, winning 1–0 in extra time.

== Honours ==
- Welsh Premier League Cup
  - Champions: 2017–18
