= Llandudno Ladies F.C. =

- Full name: Llandudno Ladies Football Club
- Nickname: The Seasiders
- Ground: Maesdu Park
- Capacity: 1,013
- Manager: Jay Davies
- League: Adran North
- 2024-25: 4th of 8
- Website: https://www.facebook.com/llandudnoladies/
Home colours	Away colours

Llandudno Ladies Football Club are a Welsh women's association football club based in Llandudno Junction, Conwy County Borough. They currently play their home games at Maesdu Park and play in the Adran North.

== History ==
Llandudno Ladies were founded as Llandudno Junction Ladies as they were affiliated to men's team Llandudno Junction. In 2010, Llandudno Junction Ladies were promoted into the Welsh Premier Women's League however they only lasted one season before being relegated. In 2012, they were promoted back to the Welsh Premier Women's Football League due to the league expanding to twelve teams and becoming a fully national league. In their debut season back in top flight, Llandudno set a Welsh record for the most goals scored in a top flight game in Wales by winning 26–0 against Caerphilly Castle F.C.

In 2013, they adopted the name of MBi Llandudno Ladies due to sponsorship. This was dropped in 2016 and the team name reverted to Llandudno Ladies.

In 2014, Llandudno Ladies moved to Maesdu Park due to changes in the Premier League's ground criteria and a new 3G pitch being installed, and switched affiliation to the men's team Llandudno F.C. In 2016, Llandudno Ladies reached the FAW Women's Cup final against Cardiff City Ladies F.C. aiming to become the first North Wales team to win it since Bangor City in 2002.

Following the closure of Wrexham Ladies F.C. in 2016, Llandudno Ladies and Rhyl & Prestatyn Ladies F.C. were the only clubs from North Wales remaining in the Welsh Premier Women's Football League until the 2019–20 season.

Llandudno Ladies began the 2019-20 season in the Welsh Women's Premier League, but withdrew in December 2019 citing a difficulty in recruiting and retaining players. Their resignation request was accepted and as such their playing record in the 2019–20 season was expunged.

=== 2021–present ===
In 2021, the Welsh Women's Premier League was renamed the Adran Premier, and the second tier split into Adran North and Adran South. They returned to playing in the 2021-22 season, joining the Adran North, and winning their conference that season. However they had not yet applied for a new Tier One license, so were not eligible for promotion to the Premier.

In the 2022-23 season, they came in third in the conference.

In the 2023-24 season, Llandudno finished as champions of the Genero Adran North, however, they lost the promotion play-off 4-0 to Briton Ferry Llansawel and missed out on promotion to the Genero Adran Premier.

In the 2024-25 season, Llandudno failed to win the title, and finished 4th place in the Adran North, below Connah's Quay (1st place), Llanfair United (2nd Place) and Felinheli (3rd place).

== Current squad ==
As of 1 October 2023

Note: Flags indicate national team as defined under FIFA eligibility rules; some limited exceptions apply. Players may hold more than one non-FIFA nationality.

No.	Pos.	Nation	Player
-	GK	WAL	Megan Robinson
-	GK	WAL	Gabi Madeira
-	DF	WAL	Sofie Owen (C)
-	DF	WAL	Rebecca Jarvis-Evans
-	DF	WAL	Claire Colville
-	DF	WAL	Catherine Jones
-	DF	WAL	Nikita Jones
-	DF	WAL	Samantha Jarvis-Evans

No.	Pos.	Nation	Player
-	DF	WAL	Shona Roberts
-	MF	ENG	Stacey Tradewell
-	MF	WAL	Jasmin Dutton
-	MF	WAL	Ffion Owen
-	FW	WAL	Maddie Williams
-	FW	WAL	Stevie Donougher
-	FW	WAL	Erin Doran

== Past squads ==
As of 23 July 2019, most recent Premier League squad.

Note: Flags indicate national team as defined under FIFA eligibility rules; some limited exceptions apply. Players may hold more than one non-FIFA nationality.

No.	Pos.	Nation	Player
-	GK	WAL	Rebecca Elliott
-	GK	WAL	Jessica Hughes
-	DF	WAL	Claire Colville
-	DF	WAL	Jordanne Greenough
-	DF	WAL	Rebecca Jarvis-Evans
-	DF	WAL	Anna Jones
-	DF	WAL	Catherine Jones
-	DF	WAL	Shona Roberts
-	DF	WAL	Georgia Smith

No.	Pos.	Nation	Player
-	DF	WAL	Bethan Williams
-	MF	WAL	Kelsey Davies
-	MF	WAL	Mari Gibbard
-	MF	WAL	Samantha Jarvis-Evans
-	MF	WAL	Sofie Owen
-	MF	ENG	Stacey Tradewell
-	FW	WAL	Louisha Doran
-	FW	WAL	Fflur Williams
