= Rhyl Ladies F.C. =

Football club in Rhyl, Wales

- Full name: Rhyl Ladies Football Club
- Nickname: The Lilywhites
- Founded: 2009 (as Prestatyn Ladies & Girls Football Club)
- Ground: Belle Vue Stadium, Rhyl
- Manager: Cassandra Thomas
- 2018-19: 9th
- Website: http://www.rhylfc.co.uk/teams/Rhyl-Ladies-FC
Home colours	Away colours

Rhyl Ladies Football Club, until 2016 known as Rhyl & Prestatyn Ladies Football Club and previously Prestatyn Ladies & Girls Football Club, are a women's association football club based in Rhyl, Denbighshire, Wales. They play their home matches at Rhyl F.C.'s Belle Vue Stadium.

== History ==
Prestatyn Ladies & Girls were founded in 2009 in Prestatyn by Tom Jamieson with a five-year plan to eventually reach the Welsh Premier Women's Football League. In 2014, Prestatyn Ladies & Girls won promotion from the North Wales League to the Welsh Premier Women's Football League by winning a play-off against the Ceredigion League's Aberystwyth University 10–0. Owing to ground regulations, the club moved away from Prestatyn and joined with Rhyl to play at Belle Vue Stadium. The club were also renamed Rhyl & Prestatyn Ladies as a result. Following the club's move to Rhyl, a new women's football club was set up in Prestatyn and became affiliated with Prestatyn Town F.C. which became known as Prestatyn Town Ladies in order to continue women's football in Prestatyn.

Following the disbandment of Wrexham Ladies F.C., a number of players moved to Rhyl & Prestatyn Ladies. Rhyl & Prestatyn Ladies along with Llandudno Ladies were the only teams from North Wales competing in the Welsh Premier Women's Football League with concerns expressed that they would be the main teams representing the region as North Wales League clubs had been dissuaded from applying for promotion due to the expense.

In August 2019, it was announced that Rhyl Ladies would be withdrawing from the Welsh Premier Women's League citing a lack of commitment to playing in a national league and were therefore unable to attract a team.

== Youth ==
Rhyl & Prestatyn Ladies run a number of youth teams. In 2016, their under 16 team won the North West Wales League title.

== Current squad ==
As of 25 July 2019.

Note: Flags indicate national team as defined under FIFA eligibility rules; some limited exceptions apply. Players may hold more than one non-FIFA nationality.

No.	Pos.	Nation	Player
-	GK	WAL	Yasmin Mills
-	GK	WAL	Samantha Mitchell
-	GK	WAL	Delyth Morgan
-	DF	WAL	Alaw Davies-Smith
-	DF	WAL	Tonicha Dickens
-	DF	ENG	Caroline Gardner
-	DF	WAL	Kim Sands
-	DF	WAL	Lucy Vaughan
-	MF	WAL	Emily Bentley
-	MF	WAL	Ellie Davies
-	MF	ENG	Rachel Nattrass

No.	Pos.	Nation	Player
-	MF	WAL	Emma Roden
-	MF	WAL	Cassandra Thomas
-	MF	WAL	Ellie Bretherton
-	MF	WAL	Lily Corry
-	FW	ENG	Kirstie Kural
-	FW	WAL	Candice Nellist
-	FW	WAL	Emily Jones
-	FW	WAL	Molly King
-	FW	WAL	Zoe Stopford
-	FW	WAL	Amy Webster
-	FW	WAL	Laura Williams
