= Port Talbot Town Ladies =

Welsh association football team

- Full name: Port Talbot Town Ladies Football Club
- Nickname: The Blues
- Founded: 2012
- Dissolved: 2022
- Ground: Victoria Road (Port Talbot)
- Capacity: 6,000 (1,000 seated)
- League: Adran Premier
- 2021-22: 8th of 8
Home colours

Port Talbot Town Ladies F.C. was a football team, playing in the Welsh Premier Women's League, which they joined in 2012 – the first season to feature a single division league.

The club plays its home matches at Victoria Road, Port Talbot, which has a capacity of 6,000.

== History ==
Port Talbot were founder members of the single division Welsh Premier Women's League in 2012. They have also reached the semi-final stages multiple times of both the FAW Women's Cup and Welsh Premier League Cup.

After finishing bottom of the 2021–22 Adran Premier, the club folded.

== Current squad ==
As of 31 July 2020.

Note: Flags indicate national team as defined under FIFA eligibility rules; some limited exceptions apply. Players may hold more than one non-FIFA nationality.

No.	Pos.	Nation	Player
-	GK	WAL	Bethan Ellis
-	DF	WAL	Sadie Bebb
-	DF	WAL	Terri Beddows
-	DF	WAL	Sophie Cole
-	DF	WAL	Carys Davies
-	DF	WAL	Nicole Rawlinson
-	DF	WAL	Teya Williams
-	MF	WAL	Lauren Amor
-	MF	WAL	Natalie Ashford
-	MF	WAL	Rachael Ball

No.	Pos.	Nation	Player
-	MF	WAL	Jessica Hammett
-	MF	WAL	Jesci Hare
-	MF	WAL	Chelsey Harris
-	MF	WAL	Kathryn Salter
-	MF	WAL	Coryn Sexton
-	FW	WAL	Vicky Beddows
-	FW	WAL	Jessica Curran
-	FW	WAL	Jessica Denscombe
-	FW	WAL	Courteney Thomas
-	FW	WAL	Laura May Walkley
