= Cardiff City F.C. (women) =

Women's football club

Cardiff City
- Full name: Cardiff City Football Club Women
- Nickname: The Bluebirds
- Short name: CCFCW
- Ground: Cardiff International Sports Stadium; Cardiff City Stadium
- Capacity: 4,953 (2,553 seated)
- Chairman: Mehmet Dalman
- Manager: Noah Bushby
- League: Adran Premier
- 2025–26: Adran Premier, 2nd of 8
- Website: http://www.cardiffcityfc.co.uk
Home colours	Away colours	Third colours

Cardiff City Football Club Women (Welsh: Clwb Pêl-droed Merched Dinas Caerdydd) is a women's football club based in Cardiff, Wales. Affiliated with Cardiff City, the club competes in the Adran Premier, the top tier of Welsh women's football.

Cardiff have won four league titles, five Welsh Cups and one Adran Trophy.

== History ==
Until the 2011–12 season, Cardiff played in the South Wales Women's League Division One. The club joined the Welsh Premier Women's League in 2012, after the decision was made to expanded the league nationally for the 2012–13 season. Cardiff won the 2012–13 Welsh Premier League on goal difference, and subsequently qualified for European football, entering the Qualifying round of the 2013–14 UEFA Women's Champions League.

Placed in Group 1, Cardiff made their European debut against SFK 2000 on 8 August 2013, losing 3–0. The club lost both remaining group games against NSA Sofia and Konak Belediyespor respectively, and finished the group in fourth place.

The club reached the final of the 2014–15 Welsh Cup, the clubs first appearance in a Welsh Cup final, but were beaten 4–2 by Swansea City on 19 April. Cardiff won the 2015–16 Welsh Cup, beating Llandudno 5–2 on 17 April.

The club reached the final of the WPWL Cup for the first time in 2021, but were beaten 4–1 by Swansea City on 26 May. The club achieved a league and cup double for the 2022–23 season, winning both the Adran Premier and Welsh Cup.

Cardiff turned semi-professional in June 2023. The club were drawn against Lithuanian side Gintra in the Qualifying rounds of the 2023–24 UEFA Women's Champions League, losing 2–0. The club achieved a domestic treble for the 2023–24 season, winning the league, Welsh Cup, and Adran Trophy. The club achieved another league and cup double for the 2024–25 season, winning both the Adran Premier and Welsh Cup.

== Stadium ==
Cardiff play their home games at the Cardiff International Sports Stadium. The club also play select matches at the Cardiff City Stadium.

== Players ==
=== First-team squad ===
As of 1 July 2026

Note: Flags indicate national team as defined under FIFA eligibility rules; some limited exceptions apply. Players may hold more than one non-FIFA nationality.

No.	Pos.	Nation	Player
2	DF	WAL	Hollie Smith
3	DF	WAL	Ffion Price
4	DF	WAL	Hannah Power (captain)
5	MF	ENG	Mia Malone
7	FW	IRL	Gillian Keenan
8	FW	WAL	Lily Billingham
9	FW	WAL	Mackenzie Olden
10	MF	ENG	Kerry Walklett
11	FW	WAL	Kate Oakley
12	GK	WAL	Grace Olsen
13	DF	WAL	Scarlett Baker-Perry
14	DF	WAL	Shannon Evans

No.	Pos.	Nation	Player
15	DF	WAL	Maddison Perrott
16	DF	WAL	Seren Thomas
17	DF	WAL	TJ Gauvain
19	FW	WAL	Madison Lloyd
20	MF	WAL	Anna Houghton
22	DF	WAL	Ella Hilliard
23	GK	WAL	Ffion Saunders
24	FW	WAL	Haile Richards
25	MF	WAL	Lily Nicholls
26	GK	POL	Daniela Kosińska
28	DF	WAL	Anuka O'Hara

== Honours ==
League

- Adran Premier (level 1)
  - Champions (4): 2012–13, 2022–23, 2023–24, 2024–25
  - Runners-up: 2025–26

Cup

- Welsh Cup
  - Winners (6): 2015–16, 2021–22, 2022–23, 2023–24, 2024–25, 2025–26
  - Runners-up (2): 2014–15, 2017–18
- Adran Trophy
  - Winners (1): 2023–24
  - Runners-up (3): 2021–22, 2022–23, 2025–26

== Record in UEFA Women's Champions League ==
=== Summary ===
Pld	W	D	L	GF	GA	Last season played
8	0	0	8	0	24	2025–26

=== By season ===
Season	Round	Opponent	Home	Away	Agg
2013–14	Qualifying round	(Bosnia and Herzegovina) SFK 2000	0–3		4th of 4
2013–14	Qualifying round	(Bulgaria) NSA Sofia	0–2		4th of 4
2013–14	Qualifying round	(Turkey) Konak Belediyespor	0–1		4th of 4
2023–24	Qualifying round	(Lithuania) Gintra	0–2		4th of 4
2023–24	Qualifying round	(Republic of Ireland) Shelbourne	0–3		4th of 4
2024–25	Qualifying round	(Netherlands) Twente	0–7		4th of 4
2024–25	Qualifying round	(North Macedonia) FK Ljuboten	0–2		4th of 4
2025–26	Qualifying round	(Republic of Ireland) Athlone Town	0–4		3rd of 3
