= 2024–25 Adran Trophy =

Welsh women's football tournament season

Tournament details
- Country: Wales
- Dates: 1 September 2024 – 9 February 2025
- Teams: 24

Final positions
- Champions: The New Saints (1st title)
- Runners-up: Swansea City

Tournament statistics
- Matches played: 39
- Goals scored: 178 (4.56 per match)
- All statistics correct as of 10 February 2025. Goals scored in penalty shoot-outs not included.

The 2024–25 season of the Adran Trophy, also known as Genero Adran Trophy for sponsorship reasons, was the 11th iteration of the Welsh women's league cup open to the teams competing in the Adran Leagues, the top two tiers of the Welsh women's league structure.

The schedule for the 2024–25 season was published on 16 May 2024. The group stage ran from 1 September until 13 October 2024, followed by the knock-out phase culminating with the final on 9 February 2025.

Cardiff City were the defending champions, having triumphed for the first time in the 2023–24 season.

The New Saints won the trophy, knocking out Cardiff in the quarter finals, coming from behind to beat Briton Ferry in dramatic fashion and then beating Swansea 3-1 in the final at Latham Park.

== Teams ==
Adran Premier	Adran North	Adran South
The 8 teams competing in the 2024–25 season.	The 8 teams competing in the 2024–25 season.	The 8 teams competing in the 2024–25 season.
Aberystwyth Town; Barry Town United; Briton Ferry Llansawel; Cardiff City; Cardiff Met; Swansea City; The New Saints FC; Wrexham	Bangor; Connah's Quay Nomads; Felinheli; Flint Town United; Llandudno; Llanfair United; NFA; Rhyl 1879	Caldicot Town; Cascade YC; Cwmbran Celtic; Llanelli Town; Penybont; Cambrian United (Note: Cambrian United has been chosen to replace Pontardawe Town following their withdrawal.); Pontypridd United; Swansea University

== Group stage ==
The group stage draw for the 2024–25 season was conducted on 29 July 2024. The Adran North and Adran South teams were split into two groups of 4 each, for a total of 4 groups. The groups stage consists of a single round-robin tournament, with the two top teams of each group advance to the round of 16.

The tiebreakers for group order are identical to the tiebreakers used in 2024–25 Adran Premier.

=== Group 1 ===
Pos	Team	Pld	W	D	L	GF	GA	GD	Pts	Qualification	CON	LLA	BAN	NFA
1	Connah's Quay Nomads (A)	3	3	0	0	11	1	+10	9	Advances to round of 16		2–1		3–0
2	Llandudno (A)	3	2	0	1	14	3	+11	6	Advances to round of 16				9–1
3	Bangor (E)	3	1	0	2	7	11	−4	3		0–6	0–4		
4	NFA (E)	3	0	0	3	2	19	−17	0				1–7	

Updated to match(es) played on 13 October 2024. Source: matchday 1, matchday 2
Rules for classification: Tiebreakers
(A) Advance to a further round; (E) Eliminated

=== Group 2 ===
Pos	Team	Pld	W	D	L	GF	GA	GD	Pts	Qualification	FLI	LLA	FEL	RHY
1	Flint Town United (A)	3	3	0	0	16	7	+9	9	Advances to round of 16		4–3	9–3	
2	Llanfair United (A)	3	2	0	1	10	6	+4	6	Advances to round of 16			3–2	4–0
3	Felinheli (E)	3	1	0	2	6	12	−6	3					1–0
4	Rhyl 1879 (E)	3	0	0	3	1	8	−7	0		1–3			

Updated to match(es) played on 13 October 2024. Source: matchday 1, matchday 2
Rules for classification: Tiebreakers
(A) Advance to a further round; (E) Eliminated

=== Group 3 ===
Pos	Team	Pld	W	D	L	GF	GA	GD	Pts	Qualification	CAL	CAS	SWA	LLA
1	Caldicot Town (A)	3	2	0	1	8	5	+3	6	Advances to round of 16		5–1		2–1
2	Cascade YC (A)	3	2	0	1	3	5	−2	6	Advances to round of 16			1–0	1–0
3	Swansea University (E)	3	1	1	1	4	3	+1	4		3–1			
4	Llanelli Town (E)	3	0	1	2	2	4	−2	1				1–1	

Updated to match(es) played on 8 September 2024. Source: matchday 1, matchday 2
Rules for classification: Tiebreakers
(A) Advance to a further round; (E) Eliminated

=== Group 4 ===
Pos	Team	Pld	W	D	L	GF	GA	GD	Pts	Qualification	PEN	CWM	PON	CAM
1	Penybont (A)	3	3	0	0	9	5	+4	9	Advances to round of 16				3–1
2	Cwmbran Celtic (A)	3	2	0	1	11	8	+3	6	Advances to round of 16	2–3			
3	Pontypridd United (E)	3	1	0	2	10	8	+2	3		2–3	4–5		
4	Cambrian United (E)	3	0	0	3	2	11	−9	0			1–4	0–4	

Updated to match(es) played on 13 October 2024. Source: matchday 1, matchday 2
Rules for classification: Tiebreakers
(A) Advance to a further round; (E) Eliminated

== Round of 16 ==
The eight teams competing in the Adran Premier (seeded) were drawn against the eight teams advancing from the group stage (unseeded).

10 November 2024	Llandudno	2–4	Aberystwyth Town
				Referee: Iwan Ellis

10 November 2024	Connah's Quay Nomads	1–2	Cardiff City
				Referee: Richard Wright

10 November 2024	Swansea City	4–0	Llanfair United
				Referee: Wayne Davies

10 November 2024	Cascade	1–0	Cardiff Met
				Referee: Tegid Richards

10 November 2024	Briton Ferry Llansawel	4–1	Penybont
				Referee: Philip Harris

10 November 2024	Caldicot Town	1–6	The New Saints
				Referee: David Lemin

10 November 2024	Cwmbran Celtic	1–4	Wrexham
				Referee: Alexander Jacklin

10 November 2024	Barry Town United	4–2	Flint Town United
				Referee: Paul Fisher

== Quarter-finals ==
8 December 2024	Barry Town United	1–3	Wrexham
UTC (UTC+0)

15 December 2024	Briton Ferry Llansawel	1–0	Aberystwyth Town
UTC (UTC+0)

8 December 2024	The New Saints	1–0	Cardiff City
UTC (UTC+0)

8 December 2024	Cascade	0–5	Swansea City
UTC (UTC+0)

== Semi-finals ==
19 January 2025	Wrexham	2–3	Swansea City	The Rock, Rhosymedre
UTC (UTC+0)	C. Jones 63'; Fuller 90+5'	Report	John-Davis 2', 45+3' (pen.); Richards 81'	Attendance: 345

19 January 2025	The New Saints	3–2	Briton Ferry Llansawel	Park Hall, Oswestry
UTC (UTC+0)		Report

== Final ==
9 February 2025
UTC (UTC+0)

Swansea City	1–3	The New Saints
John-Davis 56'	Report	Teare 2'; L. Jones 22'; Davies 26' (o.g.)

Latham Park, Newtown
Attendance: 658
Referee: Cheryl Foster
