= 2021–22 Ardal SE =

Ardal SE
- Season: 2021–22
- Champions: Abergavenny Town
- Promoted: Abergavenny Town
- Relegated: Panteg; Abertillery Excelsiors; Aberbargoed Buds
- Matches: 240

The 2021–22 Ardal SE season (also known as the 2021–22 Floodlighting and Electrical Services Ardal SE season for sponsorship reasons) was the first season of the new third-tier southern region football in Welsh football pyramid, part of the Ardal Leagues, after the cancellation of the previous season due to the COVID-19 pandemic in Wales.

== Teams ==
The league was made up of 16 teams competing for one automatic promotion place to Cymru South, whilst the second-placed team qualified for a play-off with the second-placed team of Ardal SW. Three teams were relegated to Tier 4.

=== Stadia and locations ===
Locations of teams in the 2021–22 Ardal SE

Team	Location	Home Ground
Aberbargoed Buds	Aberbargoed	Bedwellty Road
Abergavenny Town	Abergavenny	Pen-Y-Pound Stadium
Abertillery Bluebirds	Abertillery	Abertillery Leisure Centre
Abertillery Excelsiors	Abertillery	Jim Owen Field
Caldicot Town	Caldicot	Jubilee Way
Chepstow Town	Chepstow	Larkfield Park
Croesyceiliog	Croesyceiliog	Woodland Road
Goytre	Penperlleni	Plough Road
Llandrindod Wells	Llandrindod Wells	Lant Avenue Broadway
Monmouth Town	Penperlleni	Plough Road
Newport City	Newport	Newport Stadium
Panteg	Pontymister	Ty-Isaf Park
Rhayader Town	Rhayader	The Weirglodd
Tredegar Town	Tredegar	Tredegar Leisure Complex
Treowen Stars	Newbridge	Bush Park
Trethomas Bluebirds	Llanfabon	CCB Centre For Sporting Excellence

Source: Ardal SE Ground Information

== League table ==
Pos	Team	Pld	W	D	L	GF	GA	GD	Pts	Promotion, qualification or relegation
1	Abergavenny Town (C, P)	30	21	3	6	66	31	+35	66	Promotion to Cymru South
2	Caldicot Town	30	20	2	8	65	38	+27	62	Qualification for the Ardal Southern play-off
3	Trethomas Bluebirds	30	18	5	7	77	35	+42	59	
4	Goytre	30	22	6	2	105	20	+85	57 (Note: Goytre were deducted 15 points, fined £150 and removed from the Ardal League Cup quarter-finals. They were found to have contravened the FAW’s Rule 62, which prevents any player from taking part in their matches whilst having an active eligibility request from another youth team.)	
5	Monmouth Town	30	13	7	10	51	47	+4	46	
6	Treowen Stars	30	14	2	14	62	60	+2	44	
7	Llandrindod Wells	30	13	5	12	51	50	+1	44	Transferred to Ardal NE
8	Abertillery Bluebirds	30	20	4	6	56	33	+23	40	
9	Chepstow Town	30	12	3	15	43	60	−17	39	
10	Croesyceiliog	30	10	6	14	43	63	−20	36	
11	Newport City	30	9	6	15	43	45	−2	33	
12	Tredegar Town	30	8	6	16	38	63	−25	30	
13	Rhayader Town	30	4	8	18	32	71	−39	20	Transferred to Ardal NE
14	Panteg (R)	30	5	4	21	38	83	−45	19	Relegation to Tier 4
15	Abertillery Excelsiors (R)	30	4	5	21	37	85	−48	17	Relegation to Tier 4
16	Aberbargoed Buds (R)	30	9	4	17	48	71	−23	1 (Note: Aberbargoed Buds were deducted 30 points after the end of the season. They were found to have contravened the FAW’s Rule 62, which prevents any player from taking part in their matches whilst having an active eligibility request from another youth team.)	Relegation to Tier 4

Source: Ardal SE
Rules for classification: 1) Points; 2) Goal difference; 3) Goals scored; 4) Matches won; 5) Play-off.
(C) Champions; (P) Promoted; (R) Relegated

== Results ==
Home \ Away	ABB	ABT	ATB	ATE	CLD	CHP	CRS	GYR	LDW	MON	NPT	PAN	RHY	TDG	TOW	TTB
Aberbargoed Buds	—	2–0	0–3	4–2	1–5	1–2	1–3	2–4	0–1	0–2	0–2	5–5	1–1	2–3	1–0	2–2
Abergavenny Town	3–1	—	0–1	4–1	3–2	3–0	2–1	0–1	3–1	3–2	3–1	7–1	2–2	1–2	4–1	1–0
Abertillery Bluebirds	5–2	0–1	—	2–0	1–0	3–0	4–1	0–6	4–1	3–1	2–1	1–0	2–1	1–0	4–3	1–0
Abertillery Excelsiors	1–5	0–4	3–0	—	1–3	1–3	3–2	0–4	1–3	0–4	1–1	0–2	2–2	3–3	1–4	2–3
Caldicot Town	5–2	0–1	1–1	2–3	—	2–0	2–0	0–4	2–1	4–0	3–1	2–0	3–1	4–2	2–1	2–0
Chepstow Town	3–0	1–2	0–2	3–2	3–1	—	1–4	1–6	1–5	2–2	1–1	2–5	2–1	2–1	1–2	2–1
Croesyceiliog	0–3	1–3	2–1	2–2	0–1	2–4	—	0–5	2–2	0–2	2–2	2–2	1–1	2–1	1–0	1–2
Goytre	6–0	2–0	1–1	5–0	1–1	1–0	1–1	—	8–0	3–0	3–0	9–0	8–1	2–1	2–3	2–2
Llandrindod Wells	2–0	2–0	1–3	0–2	2–3	0–1	3–2	0–0	—	0–2	3–1	2–3	3–2	1–1	1–2	4–1
Monmouth Town	2–0	2–2	1–1	2–1	2–4	3–1	0–1	0–5	2–2	—	4–2	2–0	0–0	1–0	1–2	1–3
Newport City	0–1	0–2	2–1	3–1	2–0	0–1	0–3	0–2	0–1	0–1	—	1–0	2–0	5–1	3–0	1–1
Panteg	1–2	0–3	2–4	1–1	0–2	0–2	2–3	1–3	1–2	4–4	0–5	—	2–0	1–2	0–1	0–3
Rhayader Town	2–3	0–2	0–2	3–0	1–4	1–0	1–3	0–2	0–4	2–2	1–1	2–1	—	2–1	0–0	1–6
Tredegar Town	3–3	1–1	2–0	4–2	0–3	2–2	0–1	0–6	1–0	1–0	1–1	1–2	2–1	—	2–6	0–3
Treowen Stars	4–2	2–4	0–2	4–0	1–2	3–0	6–0	2–2	0–2	0–4	1–5	4–1	7–2	3–0	—	0–5
Trethomas Bluebirds	1–0	1–2	1–1	3–1	3–0	3–2	6–0	4–1	2–2	1–2	3–2	6–1	3–1	2–0	6–0	—

Source: Ardal SE Match Fixtures
Legend: Blue = home team win; Yellow = draw; Red = away team win.
