= 2020–21 Ardal SE =

Ardal SE
- Season: 2020–21
- Champions: None
- Promoted: None
- Relegated: None

The 2020–21 Ardal SE season (also known as the 2020–21 Floodlighting and Electrical Services Ardal SE season for sponsorship reasons) was to be the first season of the new third-tier southern region football in Welsh football pyramid, part of the Ardal Leagues. Teams were to play each other twice on a home and away basis.

Due to the COVID-19 pandemic in Wales, the Football Association of Wales cancelled the 2020–21 seasons of the Ardal Leagues and below.

== Teams ==
Normally, the league is made up of 16 teams competing for one automatic promotion place to Cymru South, whilst the second place team goes into a play-off with the second place team of Ardal SW. Three teams are relegated to tier 4.

=== Team changes ===
==== To Ardal SE ====
From Mid Wales Football League Division 1

- Llandrindod Wells

Promoted from Mid Wales Football League Division 2

- Rhayader Town

From Welsh Football League Division One

- Goytre
- Caldicot Town
- Abergavenny Town
- Aberbargoed Buds
- Monmouth Town
- Croesyceiliog

From Welsh Football League Division Two

- Trethomas Bluebirds
- Abertillery Bluebirds
- Newport City
- Chepstow Town
- Tredegar Town
- Treowen Stars
- Panteg

From Gwent County League Premier Division

- Abertillery Excelsiors

=== Stadia and locations ===
Locations of teams in the 2020–21 Ardal SW

Team	Location	Home Ground
Aberbargoed Buds	Aberbargoed	Bedwellty Road
Abergavenny Town	Abergavenny	Pen-Y-Pound Stadium
Abertillery Bluebirds	Abertillery	Abertillery Leisure Centre
Abertillery Excelsiors	Abertillery	Jim Owen Field
Caldicot Town	Caldicot	Jubilee Way
Chepstow Town	Chepstow	Larkfield Park
Croesyceiliog	Croesyceiliog	Woodland Road
Goytre	Penperlleni	Plough Road
Llandrindod Wells	Llandrindod Wells	Lant Avenue Broadway
Monmouth Town	Penperlleni	Plough Road
Newport City	Newport	Newport Stadium
Panteg	Pontymister	Ty-Isaf Park
Rhayader Town	Rhayader	The Weirglodd
Tredegar Town	Tredegar	Tredegar Leisure Complex
Treowen Stars	Newbridge	Bush Park
Trethomas Bluebirds	Llanfabon	CCB Centre For Sporting Excellence

Source: Ardal SW Ground Information

== Season overview ==
On 28 July 2020, The Football Association of Wales announced that this league would be named Ardal SW and would be sponsored by Floodlighting and Electrical Services. Ardal SE & Ardal SW divisions will make up the Ardal Southern region of tier 3 in the men's Welsh domestic game.
Since anti-COVID-19 restrictions were put in place by FAW, clubs could have trained in groups of 15 and contact training was allowed at all levels of football. However, competitive and exhibition matches were still not allowed to take place.

=== League table ===
Pos	Team	Pld	W	D	L	GF	GA	GD	Pts	Promotion, qualification or relegation
1	Aberbargoed Buds	0	0	0	0	0	0	0	0	Promoted to Cymru South
2	Abergavenny Town	0	0	0	0	0	0	0	0	Qualified for the Ardal Southern Play-Off
3	Abertillery Bluebirds	0	0	0	0	0	0	0	0	
4	Abertillery Excelsiors	0	0	0	0	0	0	0	0	
5	Caldicot Town	0	0	0	0	0	0	0	0	
6	Chepstow Town	0	0	0	0	0	0	0	0	
7	Croesyceiliog	0	0	0	0	0	0	0	0	
8	Goytre	0	0	0	0	0	0	0	0	
9	Llandrindod Wells	0	0	0	0	0	0	0	0	
10	Monmouth Town	0	0	0	0	0	0	0	0	
11	Newport City	0	0	0	0	0	0	0	0	
12	Panteg	0	0	0	0	0	0	0	0	
13	Rhayader Town	0	0	0	0	0	0	0	0	
14	Tredegar Town	0	0	0	0	0	0	0	0	Relegated to Tier 4 Leagues
15	Treowen Stars	0	0	0	0	0	0	0	0	Relegated to Tier 4 Leagues
16	Trethomas Bluebirds	0	0	0	0	0	0	0	0	Relegated to Tier 4 Leagues

Source: Ardal SE
Rules for classification: 1) Points; 2) Goal difference; 3) Goals scored; 4) Matches won; 5) Play-off.

== Results ==
Home \ Away	ABB	ABT	ATB	ATE	CLD	CHP	CRS	GYR	LDW	MON	NPT	PAN	RHY	TDG	TOW	TTB
Aberbargoed Buds	—															
Abergavenny Town		—														
Abertillery Bluebirds			—													
Abertillery Excelsiors				—												
Caldicot Town					—											
Chepstow Town						—										
Croesyceiliog							—									
Goytre								—								
Llandrindod Wells									—							
Monmouth Town										—						
Newport City											—					
Panteg												—				
Rhayader Town													—			
Tredegar Town														—		
Treowen Stars															—	
Trethomas Bluebirds																—

Source: Ardal SE Match Fixtures
Legend: Blue = home team win; Yellow = draw; Red = away team win.
