= 2025–26 Adran Premier =

Welsh women's football league season

Adran Premier
- Season: 2025–26
- Dates: 7 September 2025 – 5 April 2026
- Champions: Wrexham
- Relegated: Pontypridd United
- Champions League: Wrexham
- Matches: 80
- All statistics correct as of 6 April 2026.

The 2025–26 season of the Adran Premier, also known as Genero Adran Premier for sponsorship reasons, is the 17th season, 5th since the establishment of the current format, of the top-level women's football league in Wales.

Wrexham won the Adran Premier for the first time, finishing ahead of defending champions Cardiff City, who had held the title for three consecutive seasons.

== Teams ==
Locations of teams in the 2024–25 Adran Premier.

Team	Home city	Home ground	Capacity	2024–25 finish
Aberystwyth Town	Aberystwyth	Park Avenue	5,000	7th
Barry Town United	Barry	Jenner Park Stadium	2,650	6th
Briton Ferry Llansawel	Briton Ferry	Old Road Ground	2,000	2nd
Cardiff City	Cardiff	Cardiff International Sports Stadium	4,953	1st
Pontypridd United Women	Pontypridd	USW Sports Park	1,000	1st (Adran South)
Swansea City	Neath	Llandarcy Academy of Sport	2,000	5th
The New Saints	Oswestry	Park Hall	3,000	3rd
Wrexham	Wrexham	The Rock	3,000	4th

=== Team changes ===
Entering league	Exiting league
Promoted from 2024–25 Adran South	Relegated to 2025–26 Adran South
Pontypridd United	Cardiff Met

== Regular season ==
=== League table ===
Pos	Team	Pld	W	D	L	GF	GA	GD	Pts	Qualification
1	Cardiff City	14	11	2	1	53	13	+40	35	Advances to championship conference
2	Wrexham	14	11	1	2	50	20	+30	34	Advances to championship conference
3	Swansea City	14	10	0	4	48	20	+28	30	Advances to championship conference
4	The New Saints FC	14	7	2	5	34	22	+12	23	Advances to championship conference
5	Briton Ferry Llansawel	14	5	1	8	29	37	−8	16	Participates in plate conference
6	Aberystwyth Town	14	4	1	9	17	34	−17	13	Participates in plate conference
7	Barry Town United	14	4	1	9	22	47	−25	13	Participates in plate conference
8	Pontypridd United	14	0	0	14	11	71	−60	0	Participates in plate conference

Updated to match(es) played on 1 February 2026. Source: FAW.cymru
Rules for classification: Tiebreakers

=== Results ===
Home \ Away	ABE	BAR	BRI	CAC	PON	SWA	TNS	WRE
Aberystwyth Town		2–3	2–2	0–4	2–1	1–2	1–0	0–5
Barry Town United	2–1		1–4	0–5	4–1	0–4	2–4	1–6
Briton Ferry Llansawel	2–3	3–0		1–4	2–1	1–3	3–1	2–5
Cardiff City	6–1	4–2	5–1		6–0	3–0	3–3	2–1
Pontypridd United	0–2	2–3	0–4	1–7		1–5	0–8	1–6
Swansea City	2–0	7–1	6–1	1–3	10–1		3–0	1–3
The New Saints	2–0	1–1	3–2	1–0	5–1	1–2		4–2
Wrexham	3–2	3–2	3–1	1–1	6–1	3–2	2–0	

Updated to match(es) played on 11 February 2026. Source: FAW.cymru
Legend: Blue = home team win; Yellow = draw; Red = away team win.

== Championship conference ==
Pos	Team	Pld	W	D	L	GF	GA	GD	Pts	Qualification
1	Wrexham (C)	20	16	1	3	70	26	+44	49	Qualification for the Champions League first qualifying round
2	Cardiff City	20	14	3	3	65	24	+41	45	
3	Swansea City	20	12	0	8	58	35	+23	36	
4	The New Saints FC	20	8	3	9	40	38	+2	27	

Updated to match(es) played on 6 April 2026. Source: FAW.cymru
Rules for classification: Tiebreakers
(C) Champions

=== Results ===
Home \ Away	WRE	CAC	SWA	TNS
Wrexham		4–1	1–2	4–1
Cardiff City	1–3		2–1	1–1
Swansea City	1–7	1–2		0–1
The New Saints	0–1	1–5	2–5	

Updated to match(es) played on 29 March 2026. Source: FAW.cymru
Legend: Blue = home team win; Yellow = draw; Red = away team win.

== Plate conference ==
Pos	Team	Pld	W	D	L	GF	GA	GD	Pts	Qualification
1	Briton Ferry Llansawel	20	8	4	8	42	40	+2	28	
2	Barry Town United	20	7	3	10	33	52	−19	24	
3	Aberystwyth Town	20	7	2	11	31	45	−14	23	
4	Pontypridd United (R)	20	0	0	20	13	92	−79	0	Relegation to 2026–27 Adran Second-Tier

Updated to match(es) played on 6 April 2026. Source: FAW.cymru
Rules for classification: Tiebreakers
(R) Relegated

=== Results ===
Home \ Away	BAR	BRI	ABE	PON
Barry Town United		0–0	3–0	3–0
Briton Ferry Llansawel	1–1		1–1	3–0
Aberystwyth Town	4–3	0–3		4–1
Pontypridd United	0–1	1–5	0–5	

Updated to match(es) played on 29 March 2026. Source: FAW.cymru
Legend: Blue = home team win; Yellow = draw; Red = away team win.
