= 2021–22 Ardal SW =

Ardal SW
- Season: 2021–22
- Champions: Pontardawe Town
- Promoted: Pontardawe Town; Ynyshir Albions
- Relegated: Ton Pentre; West End; AFC Porth

The 2021–22 Ardal SW season (also known as the 2021–22 Floodlighting and Electrical Services Ardal SW season for sponsorship reasons) was the first season of the new third-tier northern region football in Welsh football pyramid, part of the Ardal Leagues, after the cancellation of the previous season due to the COVID-19 pandemic in Wales.

== Teams ==
The league was made up of 16 teams competing for one automatic promotion place to Cymru South, whilst the second place team qualified for a play-off with the second-placed team of Ardal SE. Three teams were relegated to Tier 4.

=== Stadia and locations ===
Locations of teams in the 2021–22 Ardal SW

Team	Location	Home Ground	Capacity
AFC Llwydcoed	Llwydcoed	Welfare Ground	1,000
AFC Porth	Porth	Dinas Park	1,200
Caerau (Ely)	Cardiff	Cwrt-yr-Ala	1,000
Cardiff Draconians	Cardiff	Riverside Ground	1,000
Cwmamman United	Glanamman	Grenig Park	1,500
Dinas Powys	Dinas Powys	The Murch	1,500
Garden Village	Kingsbridge	Stafford Common	2,000
Penrhiwceiber Rangers	Penrhiwceiber	Glasbrook Field	1,000
Penydarren BGC	Penydarren	The Bont Playing Fields	1,000
Pontardawe Town	Pontardawe	Parc Ynysderw	1,000
Pontyclun	Pontyclun	Ivor Park	1,000
Ton Pentre	Ton Pentre	Ynys Park	2,000
Treharris Athletic	Trelewis	Parc Taff Bargoed	1,000
West End	Llandarcy	Llandarcy Academy of Sport	1,000
Ynyshir Albions	Porth	Dinas Park	1,200
Ynysygerwn	Llandarcy	Llandarcy Academy of Sport	1,000

Source: Ardal SW Ground Information

== League table ==
Pos	Team	Pld	W	D	L	GF	GA	GD	Pts	Promotion, qualification or relegation
1	Pontardawe Town (C, P)	30	22	5	3	69	24	+45	71	Promotion to Cymru South
2	Ynyshir Albions (O, P)	30	22	2	6	85	38	+47	68	Qualification for the Ardal Southern play-off
3	Pontyclun	30	21	4	5	77	37	+40	67	
4	Cardiff Draconians	30	18	3	9	70	41	+29	57	
5	Penydarren BGC	30	16	7	7	83	46	+37	55	
6	Penrhiwceiber Rangers	30	15	6	9	63	34	+29	51	
7	Ynysygerwn	30	13	5	12	53	40	+13	44	
8	Caerau (Ely)	30	11	5	14	56	68	−12	38	
9	Dinas Powys	30	11	5	14	52	65	−13	38	
10	Treharris Athletic	30	13	8	9	46	45	+1	35 (Note: Treharris Athletic Western deducted 12 points for fielding an ineligible player.)	
11	Garden Village	30	9	7	14	44	68	−24	34	
12	Cwmamman United	30	7	6	17	45	73	−28	27	
13	AFC Llwydcoed	30	8	3	19	38	66	−28	27	
14	Ton Pentre (R)	30	8	4	18	30	52	−22	25 (Note: Ton Pentre deducted 3 points for fielding an ineligible player.)	Relegation to Tier 4
15	West End (R)	30	6	1	23	40	92	−52	13 (Note: West End deducted 6 points for not fulfilling a fixture.)	Relegation to Tier 4
16	AFC Porth (R)	30	3	3	24	23	85	−62	12	Relegation to Tier 4

Source: Ardal SW
Rules for classification: 1) Points; 2) Goal difference; 3) Goals scored; 4) Matches won; 5) Play-off.
(C) Champions; (O) Play-off winners; (P) Promoted; (R) Relegated

== Results ==
Home \ Away	LWY	PTH	CRU	CDD	CWM	DIP	GAV	PNR	PNY	PNT	PTY	TOP	TRH	WST	YNA	YNS
AFC Llwydcoed	—	1–0	1–2	0–2	5–1	1–1	0–1	1–4	1–1	0–1	1–2	2–1	2–1	2–0	2–4	0–5
AFC Porth	1–1	—	0–0	0–7	1–2	0–3	1–2	1–5	1–5	1–4	2–3	0–3	1–1	0–5	2–4	1–0
Caerau (Ely)	2–1	3–2	—	0–3	4–4	1–2	2–2	1–4	2–1	1–2	1–3	1–1	1–0	6–2	0–2	2–0
Cardiff Draconians	1–0	3–0	5–4	—	2–0	6–1	2–1	0–1	2–2	2–1	2–6	1–0	3–0	6–1	1–2	2–1
Cwmamman United	2–1	0–2	2–5	1–2	—	1–2	2–1	2–1	3–2	1–3	1–5	1–2	0–0	4–1	2–4	1–1
Dinas Powys	1–2	3–1	5–1	1–1	3–0	—	2–2	2–0	1–4	0–2	1–3	4–0	3–3	2–1	2–1	3–4
Garden Village	4–2	1–2	4–3	0–6	1–1	3–2	—	3–2	2–6	1–1	0–2	1–1	2–2	3–2	0–4	2–2
Penrhiwceiber Rangers	3–0	6–0	3–0	2–0	6–0	4–0	3–2	—	0–0	0–1	2–2	1–1	1–1	2–1	2–4	2–2
Penydarren BGC	3–2	4–0	5–2	3–2	5–0	1–1	5–0	0–3	—	1–1	5–1	3–0	2–2	5–0	2–2	1–0
Pontardawe Town	9–1	2–0	3–2	3–0	2–0	3–0	3–0	0–1	4–1	—	3–3	2–0	2–0	3–0	3–1	1–0
Pontyclun	5–3	2–1	3–0	2–2	2–1	3–0	3–0	3–1	1–2	0–1	—	1–0	3–1	4–0	1–3	1–1
Ton Pentre	0–3	2–1	1–1	1–2	3–2	2–1	1–2	1–0	1–3	1–2	0–2	—	3–2	1–2	1–4	1–2
Treharris Athletic	2–1	3–1	1–0	2–0	1–1	3–1	2–0	2–1	3–2	1–1	0–1	1–2	—	2–0	1–6	2–1
West End	0–2	3–1	1–4	2–1	1–4	2–4	0–2	1–1	2–5	4–2	0–8	1–0	2–3	—	1–2	1–2
Ynyshir Albions	6–0	5–0	2–3	1–3	4–3	3–1	1–0	2–0	3–2	2–2	1–2	2–0	1–2	5–0	—	2–0
Ynysygerwn	1–0	2–0	1–2	3–1	1–1	5–0	3–2	1–2	4–2	0–2	2–0	2–0	1–2	6–2	0–2	—

Source: Ardal SW Match Fixtures
Legend: Blue = home team win; Yellow = draw; Red = away team win.
