= 2024–25 Second-Tier Adran Leagues =

Welsh women's football league season

Second-Tier Adran Leagues
- Season: 2024–25
- Dates: 15 September 2024 – 20 April 2025
- Champions: Connah's Quay Nomads F.C. (North); Pontypridd United (South)
- Promoted: Pontypridd United (Play-off's)
- Relegated: NFA (North); Caldicot Town (South)
- Matches: 98
- Goals: 398 (4.06 per match)
- Top goalscorer: Polly May Wild-McGregor (21 goals, North); Nicole Fenton (11 goals, South)
- All statistics correct as of 6 April 2025.

The 2024–25 season of the Adran North and Adran South, also known as Genero Adran North and Genero Adran South for sponsorship reasons, is the 4th iteration of the second-tier women's football leagues in Wales, split geographical into two divisions (north and south).

The general schedule of the 2024–25 edition has been published on 16 May 2024, with the regular season running from 15 September 2024 to 6 April 2025 and the promotion play-off scheduled for 20 April 2025. The exact fixtures of the regular season were further specified on 1 August 2024.

Briton Ferry Llansawel were promoted to the 2024–25 Adran Premier having won both the 2023–24 Adran South and the following promotion play-off against Llandudno.

== Tiebreakers for league ranking ==
The following criteria are applied to determine the order of the teams in all rounds of the league:

1. The total number of points;
2. Goal difference in all league matches;
3. Number of goals scored in all league matches;
4. Total number of points obtained in head-to-head matches;
5. Goal difference in head-to-head matches;
6. Number of goals scored in head-to-head matches;
7. Number of away goals scored in head-to-head matches;
8. Total number of wins in all league matches;
9. Total number of away wins in all league matches;
10. Lower disciplinary points total, based on yellow and red cards only;

If two or more teams are still tied after all the above criteria are applied, a play-off match or tournament will be organised.

== Teams ==
Locations of teams in the 2024–25 Adran North and Adran South.

=== Team changes ===
Entering league		Exiting league	
Promoted from 2023 to 24 lower-level leagues	Relegated from 2024–25 Adran Premier	Promoted to 2024–25 Adran Premier	Relegated to 2024–25 lower-level leagues
Flint Town United (to Adran North); Penybont (to Adran South)	Cardiff Met (to Adran South)	Briton Ferry Llansawel (from Adran South)	Airbus UK Broughton (from Adran North); Pontardawe Town (from Adran South)

== Adran North ==
=== League table ===
Pos	Team	Pld	W	D	L	GF	GA	GD	Pts	Qualification or relegation
1	Connah's Quay Nomads F.C.	14	14	0	0	67	6	+61	42	Qualifies for promotion play-off
2	Llanfair United	14	10	1	3	39	23	+16	31	
3	Felinheli	14	7	3	4	37	21	+16	24	
4	Llandudno	14	6	4	4	47	27	+20	22	
5	Flint Town United	14	5	2	7	28	30	−2	17	
6	Rhyl 1879	14	4	1	9	17	36	−19	13	
7	Bangor	14	2	4	8	11	35	−24	10	
8	NFA	14	0	1	13	5	73	−68	1	Relegation to 2025–26 lower-level leagues

Updated to match(es) played on April 20 2025. Source: FAW.cymru
Rules for classification: Tiebreakers

=== Results ===
Home \ Away	BAN	CON	FEL	FLI	LLD	LLU	NFA	RHY
Bangor		0–5	2–2	0–0	0–1	0–4	1–1	1–1
Connah's Quay Nomads	4–0		3–1	3–2	7–1	6–0	12–0	7–0
Felinheli	7–2	0–1		2–0	2–2	3–1	10–0	2–1
Flint Town United	3–0	0–3	4–1		3–3	1–4	5–0	2–1
Llandudno	0–1	2–5	1–1	6–1		3–3	8–0	6–1
Llanfair United	5–0	0–1	2–1	4–3	3–2		6–1	1–0
NFA	0–4	0–6	1–3	1–3	0–6	0–3		1–2
Rhyl 1879	2–0	0–4	1–2	2–1	0–6	2–3	4–0	

Updated to match(es) played on 6 April 2025. Source: FAW.cymru
Legend: Blue = home team win; Yellow = draw; Red = away team win.

== Adran South ==
=== League table ===
Pos	Team	Pld	W	D	L	GF	GA	GD	Pts	Qualification or relegation
1	Pontypridd United	12	9	0	3	36	17	+19	27	Qualifies for promotion play-off
2	Swansea University	12	8	1	3	21	8	+13	25	
3	Cascade YC	12	8	1	3	24	15	+9	25	
4	Penybont	12	7	0	5	22	16	+6	21	
5	Cwmbran Celtic	12	6	1	5	22	14	+8	19	
6	Llanelli Town	12	1	1	10	12	34	−22	4	
7	Caldicot Town	12	1	0	11	10	43	−33	3	Relegation to 2025–26 lower-level leagues
8	Pontardawe Town	0	0	0	0	0	0	0	0	Withdrew before start of season

Updated to match(es) played on 20 April 2025. Source: FAW.cymru
Rules for classification: Tiebreakers

=== Results ===
Home \ Away	CAL	CAS	CWM	LLA	PEN	POT	POU	SWA
Caldicot Town		0–2	1–3	2–0	1–6		1–5	0–1
Cascade YC	4–0		1–0	2–1	1–3		6–2	1–0
Cwmbran Celtic	6–1	4–2		1–1	0–1		3–4	0–1
Llanelli Town	4–2	1–2	1–2		0–1		1–6	0–1
Penybont	2–0	2–0	0–2	5–1			1–3	0–2
Pontardawe Town								
Pontypridd United	5–1	1–2	1–0	4–0	3–1			0–1
Swansea University	5–1	1–1	0–1	6–2	3–0		0–2	

Updated to match(es) played on 6 April 2025. Source: FAW.cymru
Legend: Blue = home team win; Yellow = draw; Red = away team win.

== Promotion play-off ==
The play-off between the winner of Adran North and Adran South for a promotion spot to 2025–26 Adran Premier took place on 20 April 2025.

20 April 2025
CEST (UTC+2)

Connah's Quay Nomads FC	2–3	Pontypridd United FC
Wild-McGregor 43'; Kendrick-Jones 45+2'	Report	Hindmarsh 47'; Fenton 81'; Wheeler 83'

Latham Park, Newtown, Wales
