= 2026–27 Adran Trophy =

Welsh women's football tournament season

Tournament details
- Country: Wales
- Dates: 6 September 2026 – 7 March 2027
- Teams: 24
- Goals scored in penalty shoot-outs not included.

The 2026–27 season of the Adran Trophy, also known as Genero Adran Trophy, is the 13th iteration of the Welsh women's league cup open to the teams competing in the Adran Leagues, the top two tiers of the Welsh women's league structure. Wrexham A.F.C. Women are the defending champions.

== Qualifying ==
=== Group 1 ===
| Pos | Team | Pld | W | D | L | GF | GA | GD | Pts | |
|---|---|---|---|---|---|---|---|---|---|---|
| 1 | Flint Town United Ladies FC | 3 | 3 | 0 | 0 | 16 | 7 | +9 | 9 | Advances to round of 16 |
| 2 | Llanfair United Ladies FC | 3 | 2 | 0 | 1 | 10 | 7 | +3 | 6 | Advances to round of 16 |
| 3 | Clwb Pêl-droed Dinas Bangor City 1876 Football Club | 3 | 1 | 0 | 2 | 4 | 8 | −4 | 3 | |
| 4 | CPDM Y Felinheli | 3 | 0 | 0 | 3 | 5 | 13 | −8 | 0 | |

Updated to match(es) played on 13 October 2026. Source: https://faw.cymru/adran-leagues/adran-trophy/table/

=== Group 2 ===
| Pos | Team | Pld | W | D | L | GF | GA | GD | Pts | |
|---|---|---|---|---|---|---|---|---|---|---|
| 1 | Wrexham Foresters FC Women | 3 | 2 | 0 | 1 | 15 | 5 | +10 | 6 | Advances to round of 16 |
| 2 | Connah's Quay Nomads Women FC | 2 | 2 | 0 | 0 | 8 | 1 | +7 | 6 | Advances to round of 16 |
| 3 | Berriew Ladies FC | 3 | 1 | 0 | 2 | 4 | 6 | −2 | 3 | |
| 4 | Llandudno FC | 2 | 0 | 0 | 2 | 0 | 15 | −15 | 0 | |

Updated to match(es) played on 13 October 2026. Source: https://faw.cymru/adran-leagues/adran-trophy/table/

=== Group 3 ===
| Pos | Team | Pld | W | D | L | GF | GA | GD | Pts | |
|---|---|---|---|---|---|---|---|---|---|---|
| 1 | Cwmbran Celtic FC Women | 3 | 2 | 1 | 0 | 7 | 1 | +6 | 7 | Advances to round of 16 |
| 2 | Cascade YC Women FC | 3 | 2 | 0 | 1 | 7 | 2 | +5 | 6 | Advances to round of 16 |
| 3 | Pure Swansea FC Women | 3 | 0 | 2 | 1 | 2 | 4 | −2 | 2 | |
| 4 | Penybont Women FC | 3 | 0 | 1 | 2 | 2 | 11 | −9 | 1 | |

Updated to match(es) played on 13 October 2026. Source: https://faw.cymru/adran-leagues/adran-trophy/table/

=== Group 4 ===
| Pos | Team | Pld | W | D | L | GF | GA | GD | Pts | |
|---|---|---|---|---|---|---|---|---|---|---|
| 1 | Carmarthen Town FC Women | 3 | 2 | 1 | 0 | 9 | 5 | +4 | 7 | Advances to round of 16 |
| 2 | Pontypridd United Women | 3 | 1 | 1 | 1 | 3 | 2 | +1 | 4 | Advances to round of 16 |
| 3 | Cambrian United FC Women | 3 | 1 | 1 | 1 | 4 | 6 | −2 | 4 | |
| 4 | Llanrumney United Womens | 3 | 0 | 1 | 2 | 3 | 6 | −3 | 1 | |

Updated to match(es) played on 13 October 2026. Source: https://faw.cymru/adran-leagues/adran-trophy/table/

== Round of 16 ==
The round of 16 draw was performed on October 8, 2026.

| 8 November 2026 Round of 16 | Aberystwyth Town | 1–2 | Cardiff Met | Aberystwyth |
| 14:00 GMT | Talbot 71' | Report | Henshaw 34' 36' | Stadium: Park Avenue; Referee: Gemma Border |

| 8 November 2026 Round of 16 | Briton Ferry Llansawel | 7–0 | Cascade YC | Briton Ferry |
| 14:00 GMT | Hosford 5' 29' 50'; Llewellyn 6'; Jenkins 15'; Peyton 64'; Howells 80' | Report | | Stadium: The Renewable Centre Stadium; Referee: Erin Brennan |

| 8 November 2026 Round of 16 | Cardiff City | 11–2 | Pontypridd United | Cardiff |
| 14:00 GMT | Olden 6'; Richards 10'; Keenan 13' 17' 24'; Perry-Baker 18' 60' 78'; Malone 45'; Gauvain 50'; Billingham 86' | Report | Williams 32'; Lloyd 65' | Stadium: Cardiff International Sports Stadium; Referee: Charlotte Carpenter |

| 8 November 2026 Round of 16 | Cwmbran Celtic | 2–2 (2–4 p) | Carmarthen Town | Cwmbran |
| 14:00 GMT | Morris 72'; Waite 81' | Report | Jones 21'; Davies-Hookings 90+2' | Stadium: Motazone Arena; Referee: Joseph Gibson |
| | Penalties |
| | Grosvenor (penalty missed); Cridland (penalty scored); Shipley (penalty scored); Waite (penalty missed) | | (penalty missed) Davies-Hookings; (penalty scored) Walters Wright; (penalty scored) Jones; (penalty scored) Coulson; (penalty scored) Ashman |

| 8 November 2026 Round of 16 | Flint Town United Ladies | 0–5 | Connah's Quay Nomads | Flint |
| 14:00 GMT | | Report | Slack 2'; Hughes 5' 63' 90+1'; Redfern 51' | Stadium: Essity Stadium; Referee: Rubie Bennett |

| 8 November 2026 Round of 16 | Llanfair United | 0–5 | Wrexham | Llanfair |
| 14:00 GMT | | Report | Fuller 19' 59'; Mahmood 55'; Sadler 90+1' 90+3' | Stadium: Mount Field; Referee: Nicholas Davies |

| 8 November 2026 Round of 16 | The New Saints | 6–1 | Wrexham Foresters | Oswestry |
| 14:00 GMT | Barry 31'; Iddenden 40' 44' 45+2'; Chapman 53'; Harrison 55' | Report | Wigley 70' | Stadium: Park Hall, Oswestry; Referee: Richard Wright |

| 8 November 2026 Round of 16 | Swansea City | 1–0 | Barry Town United | Swansea |
| 14:00 GMT | Miller 50' | Report | | Stadium: ThermaGlaze Ground; Referee: Robert Fulford |

== Quarter-finals ==
The quarter-finals draw was performed on November 8, 2026.

| 20 December 2026 Quarter-final | Connah's Quay Nomads | v | Carmarthen Town | Connah's Quay |
| 14:00 GMT | | | | Stadium: Deeside Stadium |

| 20 December 2026 Quarter-final | Cardiff City | v | Briton Ferry Llansawel | Cardiff |
| 14:00 GMT | | | | Stadium: Cardiff International Sports Stadium |

| 20 December 2026 Quarter-final | The New Saints | v | Cardiff Met | Oswestry |
| 14:00 GMT | | | | Stadium: Park Hall, Oswestry |

| 20 December 2026 Quarter-final | Swansea City | v | Wrexham | Swansea |
| 14:00 GMT | | | | Stadium: ThermaGlaze Ground |
