= 2020–21 Ardal SW =

Ardal SW
- Season: 2020–21
- Champions: None
- Promoted: None
- Relegated: None

The 2020–21 Ardal SW season (also known as the 2020–21 Floodlighting and Electrical Services Ardal SW season for sponsorship reasons) was to be the first season of the new third-tier northern region football in Welsh football pyramid, part of the Ardal Leagues. Teams were to play each other twice on a home and away basis.

Due to the COVID-19 pandemic in Wales, the Football Association of Wales cancelled the 2020–21 seasons of the Ardal Leagues and below.

== Teams ==
Normally, the league is made up of 16 teams competing for one automatic promotion place to Cymru South, whilst the second place team goes into a play-off with the second place team of Ardal SE. Three teams are relegated to tier 4. STM Sports were confirmed in the Ardal SW league by the FAW. However, on 27 July 2020, they announced that they had folded, leaving only 15 sides in the South West league. Cardiff Draconians were announced as the replacement team to be admitted to the league on 3 August.

=== Team changes ===
==== To Ardal SW ====
Relegated from Cymru South

- STM Sports (Folded)
- Cwmamman United
- Caerau (Ely)

From Welsh Football League Division One

- Garden Village
- Penydarren BGC
- Ton Pentre
- Pontardawe Town
- AFC Llwydcoed
- Dinas Powys

From Welsh Football League Division Two

- Ynysygerwn
- Ynyshir Albions
- Penrhiwceiber Rangers
- Pontyclun
- West End
- Treharris Athletic
- AFC Porth

From South Wales Alliance League Premier Division

- Cardiff Draconians

=== Stadia and locations ===
Locations of teams in the 2020–21 Ardal SW

Team	Location	Home Ground	Capacity
AFC Llwydcoed	Llwydcoed	Welfare Ground	1,000
AFC Porth	Porth	Dinas Park	1,200
Caerau (Ely)	Cardiff	Cwrt-yr-Ala	1,000
Cardiff Draconians	Cardiff	Riverside Ground	1,000
Cwmamman United	Glanamman	Grenig Park	1,500
Dinas Powys	Dinas Powys	The Murch	1,500
Garden Village	Kingsbridge	Stafford Common	2,000
Penrhiwceiber Rangers	Penrhiwceiber	Glasbrook Field	1,000
Penydarren BGC	Penydarren	The Bont Playing Fields	1,000
Pontardawe Town	Pontardawe	Parc Ynysderw	1,000
Pontyclun	Pontyclun	Ivor Park	1,000
Ton Pentre	Ton Pentre	Ynys Park	2,000
Treharris Athletic	Trelewis	Parc Taff Bargoed	1,000
West End	Llandarcy	Llandarcy Academy of Sport	1,000
Ynyshir Albions	Porth	Dinas Park	1,200
Ynysygerwn	Llandarcy	Llandarcy Academy of Sport	1,000

Source: Ardal SW Ground Information

== Season overview ==
On 28 July 2020, the Football Association of Wales announced that this league would be named Ardal SW and would be sponsored by Floodlighting and Electrical Services. Ardal SE & Ardal SW divisions will make up the Ardal Southern region of tier 3 in the men's Welsh domestic game.
Since anti-COVID-19 restrictions were put in place by FAW, clubs could have trained in groups of 15 and contact training was allowed at all levels of football. However, competitive and exhibition matches were still not allowed to take place.

=== League table ===
Pos	Team	Pld	W	D	L	GF	GA	GD	Pts	Promotion, qualification or relegation
1	AFC Llwydcoed	0	0	0	0	0	0	0	0	Promoted to Cymru South
2	AFC Porth	0	0	0	0	0	0	0	0	Qualified for the Ardal Southern Play-Off
3	Caerau (Ely)	0	0	0	0	0	0	0	0	
4	Cardiff Draconians	0	0	0	0	0	0	0	0	
5	Cwmamman United	0	0	0	0	0	0	0	0	
6	Dinas Powys	0	0	0	0	0	0	0	0	
7	Garden Village	0	0	0	0	0	0	0	0	
8	Penrhiwceiber Rangers	0	0	0	0	0	0	0	0	
9	Penydarren BGC	0	0	0	0	0	0	0	0	
10	Pontardawe Town	0	0	0	0	0	0	0	0	
11	Pontyclun	0	0	0	0	0	0	0	0	
12	Ton Pentre	0	0	0	0	0	0	0	0	
13	Treharris Athletic	0	0	0	0	0	0	0	0	
14	West End	0	0	0	0	0	0	0	0	Relegated to Tier 4 Leagues
15	Ynyshir Albions	0	0	0	0	0	0	0	0	Relegated to Tier 4 Leagues
16	Ynysygerwn	0	0	0	0	0	0	0	0	Relegated to Tier 4 Leagues

Source: Ardal SW
Rules for classification: 1) Points; 2) Goal difference; 3) Goals scored; 4) Matches won; 5) Play-off.

== Results ==
Home \ Away	LWY	PTH	CRU	CDD	CWM	DIP	GAV	PNR	PNY	PNT	PTY	TOP	TRH	WST	YNA	YNS
AFC Llwydcoed	—															
AFC Porth		—														
Caerau (Ely)			—													
Cardiff Draconians				—												
Cwmamman United					—											
Dinas Powys						—										
Garden Village							—									
Penrhiwceiber Rangers								—								
Penydarren BGC									—							
Pontardawe Town										—						
Pontyclun											—					
Ton Pentre												—				
Treharris Athletic													—			
West End														—		
Ynyshir Albions															—	
Ynysygerwn																—

Source: Ardal SW Match Fixtures
Legend: Blue = home team win; Yellow = draw; Red = away team win.
