= Taff Ely & Rhymney Valley Alliance League =

- Founded: 2001
- Country: Wales
- Number of clubs: 29
- Level on pyramid: 7–8
- Promotion to: South Wales Premier League
- Domestic cup(s): Bernard Martin Cup; Greyhound Cup
- Current champions: AFC Bargoed (2025–26)
- Current: 2025–26

The Taff Ely & Rhymney Valley (TERV) is a football league covering the Taff-Ely and Rhymney Valley in South Wales. The leagues are at the seventh and eighth levels of the Welsh football league system.

== Divisions ==
The league is currently composed of two divisions.

=== Member clubs 2025–26 ===
==== Premier Division ====
Team	Location	Stadium
AFC Bargoed	Bargoed	Bargoed Park
Cascade YC	Penpedairheol	Pen-y-Bryn Playing Fields
Church Village	Upper Boat	Upper Boat
Cilfynydd	Upper Boat	Upper Boat
Gelligaer	Gelligaer	Gelligaer Playing Fields
Graig	Pontypridd	Ynysangharad Park
Hopkinstown	Hopkinstown	Great Western Field
Llanbradach	Llanbradach	Llanbradach Park
Pontypridd	Pontypridd	Taff Vale Park
Rhydyfelin	Rhydyfelin	The Dog Track Ground
Rhydyfelin Non-Political	Upper Boat	Upper Boat
Springfield United (withdrew February 2026)	Tir-y-Berth	Tir-y-Berth Football Pitch
Talbot Green	Talbot Green	Talbot Park
Ynysybwl	Ynysybwl	Ynysybwl Recreation Ground

==== Division One ====
Team	Location	Stadium
AFC Bargoed (reserves)	Bargoed	Bargoed Park
Aber Valley (reserves)	Abertridwr	Abertridwr Park
Caerphilly Athletic (reserves)	Caerphilly	Ysgol Gyfun Cwm Rhymni Y Gwyndy Campus
Cilfynydd (reserves)	Upper Boat	Upper Boat
Cwm Welfare (reserves)	Beddau	Mount Pleasant Park
Cwrt Rawlin (reserves)	Caerphilly	Owain Glyndŵr Playing Fields
Llanbradach (reserves)	Llanbradach	Llanbradach Park
Llantwit Fardre (reserves)	Llantwit Fardre	Tonteg Park
Nelson Cavaliers (reserves)	Nelson	The Wern Park
Pontyclun (reserves)	Pontyclun	Ivor Park
Pontypridd (reserves)	Pontypridd	Taff Vale Park
Rhydyfelin (reserves)	Rhydyfelin	The Dog Track Ground
Rhydyfelin Non-Political (reserves)	Upper Boat	Upper Boat
Talbot Green (reserves)	Talbot Green	Talbot Park
Treforest (development)	Treforest	White Tips Stadium
Treforest (reserves)	Treforest	White Tips Stadium

== Promotion and relegation ==
Promotion from the Premier Division is possible to the lowest tier of the South Wales Premier League, with the champion of the league playing the other tier 7 champions from the South Wales regional leagues via play-off games to determine promotion.

Since 2025 the league has been made up of two divisions - a Premier Division for first teams, and a Division One for reserve teams. Before then both first and reserve teams could play in the same divisions, though reserve teams were banned from the Premier Division.

== Champions (Premier Division) ==
Season	Team	Promoted	Ref.
2001-02	unknown	—	—
2002-03	Aber Valley YMCA	Promoted to SW Amateur League	
2003-04	Caerphilly Town	—	
2004-05	unknown	—	—
2005-06	unknown	—	—
2006-07	Ynysybwl?	—	
2007-08	AFC Talbot Green	Promoted to SW Amateur League	
2008-09	Penyrheol	—	
2009-10	unknown	—	—
2010-11	Pontlottyn	—	
2011-12	Pontlottyn	Promoted to SW Senior League	
2012-13	Penrhos FC	—	
2013-14	Dynamo Aber	Promoted to SW Amateur League	
2014-15	Llanbradach	Promoted to SW Alliance League	
2015-16	Ynysybwl Athletic	—	
2016-17	Ynysybwl Athletic	—	
2017-18	Nelson Cavaliers	—	
2018-19	Ynysybwl Athletic	—	—
2019-20	Nelson Cavaliers	Promoted to SW Alliance League	
2020-21	Cancelled due to Covid-19	—	—
2021-22	Church Village	—	—
2022-23	Cwrt Rawlin	Promoted to SW Alliance League via play-offs	—
2023-24	Talbot Green	Promoted to SW Premier League	—
2024-25	Rhydyfelin	—	—
2025-26	AFC Bargoed	—	—

== Cup Competitions ==
All teams entered in to both Premier and Division One compete in two domestic cup competitions each season, the Bernard Martin Cup and Greyhound Cup.
