= Ynysybwl Athletic A.F.C. =

Former association football club in Wales

Ynysybwl Football Club
- Full name: Ynysybwl Football Club
- Founded: unknown as Ynysybwl; 2010s as Ynysybwl Athletic; 2021 as Ynysybwl
- Dissolved: 1992 forming Pontypridd Town; 2019
- Ground: Ynysangharad Park
- League: TERV Premier
- 2025–26: TERV Premier, 11th of 11
Home colours

Ynysybwl F.C. is a Welsh football club from the village of Ynysybwl in Cwm Clydach in Wales and forms part of the community of Ynysybwl and Coed-y-cwm. They play in the TERV Premier.

The club played for 25 seasons in the Welsh Football League, before in the early 1990s merging with Pontypridd. After reforming in the 2010s as Ynysybwl Athletic, the club played in the Taff Ely & Rhymney Valley Alliance League and won three league titles before folding in 2019.

The club reformed again in 2021, returning to the Taff Ely & Rhymney Valley Alliance League.

== History ==
An association football club in Ynysybwl was active as early as November 1895. For the 1910–11 season Ynysybwl were members of the Glamorgan League Division Three. By 1913 there were three football clubs in the village, of those it was Christchurch Crusaders described as the best.

There is evidence of the club playing in the Welsh Football League in the 1920s and again for two seasons in the post-war period. They rejoined the league in the 1967–68 season and over the next twenty years fluctuated between the second and third tiers of the Welsh League. Promotion to the top flight was secured in 1989 and in 1991 the club merged with Pontypridd Social Club to become Pontypridd-Ynysybwl. A year later, Ynysybwl was removed entirely from the club's identity as Pontypridd Town were formed.

The club reformed in the 2010s and played in the Taff Ely & Rhymney Valley Alliance League. Their first season in Division One in 2014–15 saw them finish fourth with the following season they moved up to the Premier Division, winning the first of their three titles in four years in that division (the fourth year they finished on equal points with the winners, losing out for the title only on goal difference.) At the end of the 2018–19 season the club again won the title, but lost to Maesteg Park in the South Wales Alliance League promotion play-off final. Later that summer the club withdrew from the 2019–20 season.

In 2021 the club was reformed as Ynysybwl FC, and won the Taff Ely & Rhymney Valley Alliance League Division One in their first season.

== Honours ==
- Welsh Football League Division Two (Tier 3 of the Welsh Football pyramid) – Champions: 1968–69
- Welsh Football League Division One (Tier 3 of the Welsh Football pyramid) - Runners-Up: 1988–89
- Taff Ely & Rhymney Valley Alliance League Premier League – Champions: 2015–16; 2016–17; 2018–19
- Taff Ely & Rhymney Valley Alliance League Premier League – Runners-Up: 2017–18
- Taff Ely & Rhymney Valley Alliance League Division One – Champions: 2021–22

== Welsh Football League history ==
Information sourced from the Football Club History Database for Ynysybwl Athletic and Pontypridd-Ynysybwl, and the Welsh Soccer Archive.

Season	Pyramid Tier	League	Final position
1920–21	2	Welsh Football League Division Two	16th
1925–26	2	Welsh Football League Division Two Section B	5th
1945–46	2	Welsh Football League Division Two East	10th
1946–47	2	Welsh Football League Division Two East	17th
1967–68 (Note: From the 1964–65 season Division 1 was renamed 'Premier Division', Division 2 East and West were replaced by 'Division One' and 'Division Two' (effectively Division Two and Division Three).)	3	Welsh Football League Division Two	4th
1968–69	3	Welsh Football League Division Two	1st – Champions (promoted)
1968–69	2	Welsh Football League Division One	7th
1969–70	2	Welsh Football League Division One	11th
1970–71	2	Welsh Football League Division One	11th
1971–72	2	Welsh Football League Division One	6th
1972–73	2	Welsh Football League Division One	16th
1973–74	2	Welsh Football League Division One	10th
1974–75	2	Welsh Football League Division One	18th (relegated)
1975–76	3	Welsh Football League Division Two	14th
1976–77	3	Welsh Football League Division Two	6th
1977–78	3	Welsh Football League Division Two	19th
1978–79	3	Welsh Football League Division Two	20th
1979–80	3	Welsh Football League Division Two	20th
1980–81	3	Welsh Football League Division Two	17th
1981–82	3	Welsh Football League Division Two	15th
1982–83	3	Welsh Football League Division Two	12th
1983–84 (Note: In this season The Premier Division (Division One) was renamed 'National Division'. The 2nd tier division was renamed 'Premier Division' with the 3rd tier division named 'Division One'.)	3	Welsh Football League Division One	11th
1984–85	3	Welsh Football League Division One	10th
1985–86	3	Welsh Football League Division One	12th
1986–87	3	Welsh Football League Division One	5th
1987–88	3	Welsh Football League Division One	9th
1988–89	3	Welsh Football League Division One	2nd – Runners Up (promoted)
1989–90	2	Welsh Football League Premier Division	5th
1990–91	2	Welsh Football League Division One	11th
1991–92 (Note: In this season the club was renamed Pontypridd-Ynysybwl F.C.)	2	Welsh Football League Division One	6th
