= 2022–23 Adran Trophy =

Tournament details
- Country: Wales

Final positions
- Champions: Cardiff Met
- Runners-up: Cardiff City

The 2022–23 Adran Trophy (also known as Genero Adran Trophy for sponsorship reasons) was the 9th edition of the Adran Trophy (formerly known as the Premier League Cup), a knock-out cup competition for women's association football teams in Wales.

== Round of 16 ==
Home team	Result	Away team
21 November 2022
Swansea City	1–2	Llandudno
Wrexham	7–1	Abergavenny
Briton Ferry Llansawel	1–3	Cardiff City FC
Pontypridd Town	1–0	Swansea University
Rhyl	0–5	Cardiff Met
Cardiff Wanderers	2–3	Aberystwyth Town
Cascade	0–5	The New Saints
Barry Town United	2–3	Connah's Quay Nomads

== Quarterfinals ==
Home team	Result	Away team
16 January 2023
Cardiff City FC	10–0	Llandudno
Cardiff Met	6–0	Connah's Quay Nomads
Aberystwyth Town	2–0	Wrexham
The New Saints	2–0	Pontypridd United

== Semi-finals ==
Home team	Result	Away team
13 February 2022
Cardiff Met	3–1	Aberystwyth Town
Cardiff City Women	3–1	The New Saints

== Final ==
13 March 2022
Final

Cardiff Met	3–1	Cardiff City
Murray 14' (pen.), 24'; Preece		Walsh 67'

SDM Glass Stadium, Bridgend
