= Cascade YC =

- Full name: Cascade Youth Club Football Club
- Nickname: The Cascades
- Ground: Penybryn Playing Fields
- League: TERV Premier
- 2024–25: TERV Premier, 5th of 11

Cascade YC Football Club (Welsh: Clwb Pêl-droed CI Penpedairheol) is a Welsh association football club based in the village of Penpedairheol (also known as Cascade), situated in the valleys of Caerphilly County Borough, Wales. Their men's team currently competes in the TERV Premier.

They also have a women's team, who currently play in the Adran South. In the 2020–21 season they played in the Welsh Premier Women's League but were relegated due to a league restructure.

== History ==
=== Formation ===
The club variably claims a founding date of 1967

=== Awards and recognition ===
In 2003, the club had achieved a bronze status and was the first youth club in the Caerphilly County Borough to do so. The club was also recognised by the Caerphilly County Borough, and in 2002 and 2003, the club won the Caerphilly County Borough's Club of the Year award. They won the Bernard Martin Cup in 2025.

=== Cup competitions ===
The team competed in the qualifying stage of the Welsh Cup in 2023–24 and 2024–25, and were eliminated from all qualifying stages, including the 2025–26 Welsh Cup qualifying stage, with their first match being played on 26 July 2025.

Cascade have been entered into the Dragon Signs Amateur Trophy for the 2025–26 season where they will face Tongwynlais in the first qualifying stage on 2 August.

=== Results in cup competitions ===
- Only results with sources should go into the box.

Season	Cup	Performance	Final opponent	Score	Ref.
2021-22	TERV Bernard Martin Cup	First Round	AFC Bargoed	3-4	
2021-22	TERV Greyhound Cup	Semi-Finals	Cefn Hengoed	1-2	
2022-23	TERV Bernard Martin Cup	Second Round	Mason Arms	1-4	
2022-23	TERV Greyhound Cup	Second Round	Cwrt Rawlin	0-3	
2023-24	Welsh Cup	1st Qualifying Stage	Treherbert BGC	3-6	
2023-24	TERV Bernard Martin Cup	Semi-Finals	Pontypridd	1-3	
2023-24	TERV Greyhound Cup	Quarter-Finals	Llantwit Fardre Reserves	3-3 (PEN 3-4)	
2024-25	Welsh Cup	2nd Qualifying Stage	Abertillery Bluebirds F.C.	2-3	
2024-25	TERV Bernard Martin Cup	Champions	Rhydyfelin	3-1	
2024-25	TERV Greyhound Cup	Second Round	Llantwit Fardre Reserves	1-1 (PEN 1-2)	
2025-26	Welsh Cup	1st Qualifying Stage	Bryncoch	2-2 (PEN 4-6)	
2025-26	Dragon Signs Amateur Trophy	1st Qualifying Stage	Tongwynlais	2–2 (PEN 4–5)	
2025-26	Hugh James SWFA Senior Cup	Third Round	AFC Bargoed	1–3	

== Honours ==
Cascade have only ever won one trophy to date, according to available media. They won their first trophy on 31 May 2025, when they beat fellow TERV Premier team, Rhydyfelin 3-1 in the Bernard Martin Cup final (not to be confused with Rhydyfelin Non Pol, whom they beat in the semi-final).

- TERV Bernard Martin Cup: 2024–25

== Rivalry ==
Cascade YC share their main rivalry with AFC Bargoed.

=== Rivalry record ===
As of 25 April 2026

- Results since the 2021-22 season

==== Rivalry with AFC Bargoed ====
Matches played	Cascade win	Draw	Bargoed win	Reference
13	2	2	9	

=== Performance against Bargoed ===
Performance by Cascade (%)
1. Win - 2 (15.4%)
2. Draw - 2 (15.4%)
3. Loss - 9 (69.2%)

=== History ===
Cascade and Bargoed are local rivals. They both play in the TERV Premier. Bargoed have more victories against Cascade since the 2021-22 season.
