= Abergavenny Town F.C. =

Association football club in Wales

Coordinates: 51°49′45″N 3°1′16″W

Abergavenny Town
- Full name: Abergavenny Town Football Club
- Nicknames: The Pennies, The Butchers
- Founded: 2014
- Ground: Pen-Y-Pound Stadium
- Manager: Steve Davies
- League: Ardal SE League
- 2025–26: Ardal SE League, 9th of 16
Home colours	Away colours

Abergavenny Town Football Club is a Welsh association football club based in the town of Abergavenny, Monmouthshire, The team play in the Ardal SE League.

The club was founded in June 2014 after local side Govilon changed their name, eleven months after the former club Abergavenny Thursdays folded, citing a lack of players as the reason.

== History ==
The new club was entered into the 5th Tier of the Welsh football pyramid, the Gwent County League First Division for the 2014–15 season. They finished the season as champions of the division after going the entire league campaign unbeaten. This earned the club a place in Tier 4 of the Welsh Football League.

Success continued during the 2015–16 season as the club won promotion to the 3rd Tier, after finishing second in the league. The club also won the FAW trophy following a 1–0 victory over Sully Sports.

The 2016–17 saw Abergavenny finish 11th in the 3rd Tier of the Welsh football pyramid and the end of the season saw long time servant and Manager Steve “Butch” Morgan leave the club after 20 years of involvement at Govilon and Abergavenny.

Season 2017–18 saw the club promote reserve team player/manager Ben Bannon to first team manager. Bannon led the team to a 10th-place finish in the league.

The club narrowly missed out on the promotion positions in 2018–19, finishing 5th, just 2 points below 3rd place Caerau (Ely) A.F.C. They remained in Tier 3 for the third year running.

Abergavenny's 2019–20 season in Tier 3 (the 2019-20 Welsh Football League Division One) was cut short by the COVID-19 pandemic. After the Football Association of Wales decided on a points per game basis to conclude the season, Abergavenny finished 13th. In June 2020 they were awarded a Tier 3 license by the FAW, as part of the FAW restructuring of the Welsh Leagues and joined the new Ardal Leagues structure in the South East Division. After the 2020–21 season was cancelled due to Covid restrictions, the club went on to become the inaugural league champions in the 2021–22 season and gained promotion to the Cymru South for the 2022–23 season.

== Pen-Y-Pound Stadium ==
Football has been played at Pen-Y-Pound since around the 1930s. Stadium development, including building a 250-seat stand and club house, was achieved by Thursday's first management committee led by local businessman Vince Sullivan. Unfortunately the stand hasn't been used since the League of Wales days in the early 1990s but the club are trying to get the stand reopened and used in the future.

In 1963 Pen-Y-Pound was used as a helicopter landing site for John Lennon. The Beatles were playing in the Town and Lennon had been in London making an appearance on the BBC television show Juke Box Jury. He landed in Abergavenny's Penypound football ground at 9.50pm, and was driven straight to the Town Hall.

The ground has hosted a couple of Welsh Youth international matches during the years.

== Abergavenny Women ==
Abergavenny Women F.C. was formed in 2011, and played in the Welsh Premier Women's League from 2012 to 2021. In the 2013–14 season they finished second. Until 2016, the team was part of PILCS A.F.C. and was based in Pontypool.

In the shortened 2020/21 season they finished 4th. The FAW reformed the league as the Adran Premier for the 2021/22 season, and imposed new requirements on clubs in the Premier league. As a result, Abergavenny lost their Tier One license and were placed in the new tier two league, Adran South.

In the 2021–22 season they won the league, gained their license, and were promoted to the Premier League. The 2022–23 season was a difficult one for them. They forfeited two matches in January 2023, being unable to field a side for one match, and lost 16 of their fixtures, coming in last in the league. They were fined £2,000 for a number of other issues. At the end of the season, facing financial challenges and relegation back to Adran South, the club folded.

== Honours ==
- Gwent County League Division 1 Champions – 2014–15
- Welsh Football League Division 3 Runners Up - 2015–16
- Ardal SE – Champions: 2021–22
- FAW Trophy Winners - 2015-15
