= Adran Leagues =

Women's football league in Wales

The Adran Leagues (for sponsorship reasons called the Genero Adran Leagues) is the senior women's football league in Wales. Founded in 2009 as the Welsh Women's League, it rebranded in 2021 as the Adran Leagues. It consist of three divisions – the top tier is the Adran Premier, and the second tier is split geographically into Adran North and Adran South conferences.

The Adran Leagues runs an annual competition for all clubs, known as the Adran Trophy.

== League competition ==
=== Adran Premier ===
As of 2024, the Adran Premier consists of eight teams. Each year one is relegated and one is promoted from the second tier. The winners of Adran North and Adran South conferences have a playoff to determine who is promoted, if that team qualifies for a tier one license.

During the first three years of the league's existence, the Premier league was also split into North and South conferences, with a final match determining the overall league champion.

=== Second tier ===
Adran Leagues
- Promotion to: Adran Premier
- Website: Official website
- Current: 2024–25 Second-Tier Adran Leagues

Adran North and South each consist of eight teams. A play-off between the winners of each conference determines the overall league champion, who is promoted to the Adran Premier. Similarly, the winners of the North Wales Women’s League and the South Wales Women's & Girls' League are promoted into Adran North and Adran South, respectively, replacing the lowest-ranked team or filling a vacancy in the table.

- In 2021–22, Abergavenny Women won the Adran South conference and promotion to the Premier League. Neither of the top two teams in Adran North had applied for a Tier One license, so there was no play-off match.
- In 2022–23, Wrexham Women won the play-off against Briton Ferry and were promoted.
- In 2023–24, Briton Ferry Llansawel A.F.C. Ladies won the play-off against Llandudno and were promoted.
- In 2024–25, Pontypridd United won the play-off against Connah’s Quay Nomads and were promoted.

==== Adran North ====
In 2021–22, Llandudno won the conference but had not applied for a Tier One license and so there was no play-off for promotion.

In 2022–23, there were only seven teams in the conference. Wrexham Women won the conference and promotion. Abergavenny were relegated to Adran North after losing the Premier league, but had been unable to field a team for two games that season and folded rather than returning to the second tier. Bangor won the North Wales Women’s League and was promoted to Adran North. NFA was also promoted into the conference to make a full complement of eight teams.

For the 2026–27 season, the teams in the conference are:

- Bangor City 1876
- Berriew
- Connah's Quay Nomads
- Flint Town United Ladies
- Y Felinheli
- Llandudno
- Llanfair United
- Wrexhan Foresters

==== Adran South ====
At the start of the 2021–22 season, Abergavenny Women were relegated to Adran South after they lost their tier one license. They won the conference and promotion that season.

In 2022–23, Merthyr Town was relegated to the South Wales Women's & Girls' League and Pontardawe Town was promoted into Adran South. Briton Ferry won the conference.

For the 2026–27 season, the teams in the conference are:

- Cambrian United
- Carmarthen Town
- Cascade YC
- Cwmbran Celtic
- Llanrumney United
- Penybont
- Pontypridd United
- Pure Swansea

Taffs Well were supposed to compete in the 2026–27 season but withdrew just over a week before the start of the season. They were replaced by Cambrian United.

== Adran Trophy ==
Adran Trophy
- Founded: 2013; 13 years ago
- Region: Wales
- Current champions: Wrexham
- Most championships: Cardiff Met. Ladies F.C. (5 titles)
- Website: faw.cymru/adran-leagues/adran-trophy/
- 2026–27 Adran Trophy

The annual league competition, first held in 2014, was initially called the Welsh Premier League Cup. In 2021 it was rebranded to the Adran Trophy.

The competition is run with 24 participating clubs, including all current members of the Premier, North, and South leagues, with the possibility of additional wildcard entries to fill out the total number of clubs to 24.

Past winners
| Season | Winner | Refs |
|---|---|---|
| 2013–14 | Cardiff Met. Ladies F.C. | |
| 2014–15 | PILCS | |
| 2015–16 | Swansea City Ladies F.C. | |
| 2016–17 | Cardiff Met. Ladies | |
| 2017–18 | Cyncoed Ladies F.C. | |
| 2018–19 | Cardiff Met. Ladies | |
| 2019–20 | Final cancelled due to the COVID-19 pandemic | |
| 2020–21 | Swansea City Ladies | |
| 2021–22 | Cardiff Met. Ladies | |
| 2022–23 | Cardiff Met. Ladies | |
| 2023–24 | Cardiff City | |
| 2024–25 | The New Saints | |
| 2025–26 | Wrexham | |
| 2026–27 | to be decided | |
