= Bargoed A.F.C. =

Former football club based in Bargoed

Bargoed
- Full name: Bargoed and District Association Football Club

Bargoed A.F.C. was a Welsh football club based in Bargoed, Caerphilly County Borough. They played in the Welsh Football League during the 1910s and 1920s, as well as the FA Cup.

== History ==
Bargoed entered the FA Cup in the 1914–15 season, losing in the first qualifying round to Mid-Rhondda. After World War I they entered the FA Cup for the next three seasons.

=== Later clubs ===
Later in the 1920s a club named Bargoed Athletic played in the Welsh Football League. After World War II Bargoed United joined the Welsh League, where they would stay until 1955.

AFC Bargoed played in the South Wales Amateur League until its merger with the South Wales Senior League in 2015, and continued on in the South Wales Alliance League until 2019. From 2007 to 2011 the club was known as AFC Bargoed Redz. As of 2025, AFC Bargoed currently play in the Taff Ely & Rhymney Valley Alliance League.
