= 2024–25 Adran Premier =

Welsh women's football league season

Adran Premier
- Season: 2024–25
- Dates: 15 September 2024 – 13 April 2025
- Champions: Cardiff City Women
- Relegated: Cardiff Met
- Champions League: Cardiff City Women
- Matches: 80
- All statistics correct as of 6 April 2025.

The 2024–25 season of the Adran Premier, also known as Genero Adran Premier for sponsorship reasons, is the 16th season, 4th since the establishment of the current format, of the top-level women's football league in Wales.

The general schedule of the 2024–25 edition has been published on 16 May 2024, with the regular season running from 15 September 2024 to 2 February 2025 and the championship conference and plate conference scheduled between 2 March 2025 and 13 April 2024. The exact fixtures of the regular season were further specified on 2 August 2024.

Cardiff City are the defending champions, having won their second title in a row, and third overall, in the 2023–24 season.

== Tiebreakers for league ranking ==
The following criteria are applied to determine the order of the teams in all rounds of the league:

1. The total number of points;
2. Goal difference in all league matches;
3. Number of goals scored in all league matches;
4. Total number of points obtained in head-to-head matches;
5. Number of goals scored in head-to-head matches;
6. Number of away goals scored in head-to-head matches;
7. Total number of wins in all league matches;
8. Total number of away wins in all league matches;
9. Lower disciplinary points total, based on yellow and red cards only;

If two or more teams are still tied after all the above criteria are applied, a play-off match or tournament will be organised.

== Teams ==
Locations of teams in the 2024–25 Adran Premier.

Team	Home city	Home ground	Capacity	2023–24 finish
Aberystwyth Town	Aberystwyth	Park Avenue	5,000	4th
Barry Town United	Barry	Jenner Park Stadium	2,650	7th
Briton Ferry Llansawel	Briton Ferry	Old Road Ground	2,000	1st (Adran South)
Cardiff City	Cardiff	Cardiff International Sports Stadium	4,953	1st
Cardiff Met	Cardiff	Cardiff Met Cyncoed Campus	1,620	6th
Swansea City	Neath	Llandarcy Academy of Sport	2,000	2nd
The New Saints FC	Oswestry	Park Hall	3,000	5th
Wrexham	Wrexham	The Rock	3,000	3rd

=== Team changes ===
Entering league	Exiting league
Promoted from 2023 to 2024 Adran South	Relegated to 2024–25 Adran South
Briton Ferry Llansawel	Pontypridd United

== Regular season ==
=== League table ===
Pos	Team	Pld	W	D	L	GF	GA	GD	Pts	Qualification
1	Cardiff City	14	11	1	2	35	15	+20	34	Advances to championship conference
2	Briton Ferry Llansawel	14	8	5	1	28	11	+17	29	Advances to championship conference
3	The New Saints FC	14	8	3	3	33	13	+20	27	Advances to championship conference
4	Wrexham	14	7	1	6	28	22	+6	22	Advances to championship conference
5	Swansea City	14	6	3	5	21	18	+3	21	Participates in plate conference
6	Barry Town United	14	4	5	5	22	25	−3	17	Participates in plate conference
7	Aberystwyth Town	14	1	2	11	8	40	−32	5	Participates in plate conference
8	Cardiff Met	14	0	2	12	9	40	−31	2	Participates in plate conference

Updated to match(es) played on 28 February 2025. Source: FAW.cymru
Rules for classification: Tiebreakers

=== Results ===
Home \ Away	ABE	BAR	BRI	CAC	CAM	SWA	TNS	WRE
Aberystwyth Town		1–1	0–4	2–4	1–0	0–4	0–1	1–3
Barry Town United	4–0		0–0	1–3	3–2	2–2	0–5	1–0
Briton Ferry Llansawel	1–0	3–1		3–1	5–0	2–0	2–2	3–0
Cardiff City	2–0	3–0	2–2		3–1	1–0	2–0	4–1
Cardiff Met	0–0	1–5	1–2	1–4		1–2	1–2	1–1
Swansea City	3–1	0–0	0–0	1–0	4–0		0–5	2–3
The New Saints FC	6–1	1–1	1–1	3–4	5–0	1–0		1–0
Wrexham	7–1	4–3	3–0	0–2	3–0	2–3	1–0	

Updated to match(es) played on 28 February 2025. Source: FAW.cymru
Legend: Blue = home team win; Yellow = draw; Red = away team win.

== Championship conference ==
=== Conference table ===
Pos	Team	Pld	W	D	L	GF	GA	GD	Pts	Qualification
1	Cardiff City (C)	20	15	1	4	49	26	+23	46	Qualification for the Champions League first qualifying round
2	Briton Ferry Llansawel	20	10	6	4	38	21	+17	36	
3	The New Saints FC	20	10	3	7	41	25	+16	33	
4	Wrexham	20	10	2	8	40	32	+8	32	

Updated to match(es) played on 13 April 2025. Source: FAW.cymru
Rules for classification: Tiebreakers
(C) Champions

=== Results ===
Home \ Away	CAC	BRI	TNS	WRE
Cardiff City		3–2	3–1	1–3
Briton Ferry Llansawel	0–2		1–2	2–2
The New Saints FC	2–3	1–2		1–0
Wrexham	4–2	1–3	3–1	

Updated to match(es) played on 14 April 2025. Source: FAW.cymru
Legend: Blue = home team win; Yellow = draw; Red = away team win.

== Plate conference ==
=== Conference table ===
Pos	Team	Pld	W	D	L	GF	GA	GD	Pts	Relegation
1	Swansea City	20	11	4	5	35	21	+14	37	
2	Barry Town United	20	6	6	8	27	33	−6	24	
3	Aberystwyth Town	20	4	2	14	17	52	−35	14	
4	Cardiff Met (R)	20	1	2	17	14	49	−35	5	Relegation to 2025–26 Adran South

Updated to match(es) played on 13 April 2025. Source: FAW.cymru
Rules for classification: Tiebreakers
(R) Relegated

=== Results ===
Home \ Away	SWA	BAR	ABE	CAM
Swansea City		0–0	4–1	2–0
Barry Town United	0–3		1–3	0–2
Aberystwyth Town	1–3	0–2		2–1
Cardiff Met	1–2	0–2	1–2	

Updated to match(es) played on 13 April 2025. Source: FAW.cymru
Legend: Blue = home team win; Yellow = draw; Red = away team win.

== Top scorers ==
Rank	Player	Club	Goals
1	(Wales) Ffion Price	Cardiff City	12
2	(Wales) Ava Suckley	Wrexham	11
3	(England) Chantelle Teare	The New Saints	10
4	(England) Abbie Iddenden	Wrexham	9
5	(England) Fiona Barry	Cardiff City	8

Updated to match(es) played on 6 April 2025. Source:Cymru Football
