= Pontypridd A.F.C. (2018) =

Association football club in Wales

Pontypridd AFC
- Full name: Pontypridd Association Football Club
- Nickname: The Black Sheep
- Founded: 2018
- Ground: Taff Vale Park
- League: TERV Premier
- 2024–25: TERV Division One, 2nd of 8 (promoted)
- Website: https://pontypriddfc.com
Home colours

Pontypridd F.C. is an amateur Welsh football team based in Pontypridd, formed in 2018 and inspired by the former professional club Pontypridd A.F.C. which existed between 1911 and 1926. The club was reformed in May 2018 by former members of the Pontypridd Town reserve team and plays in the TERV Premier.

== History ==
At the end of the 2017–18 season the players and coaches of Pontypridd Town reserves decided to form their own club based in the town. There were several reasons for the split, including frustrations at being unable to progress further up the Welsh football pyramid as a reserve team, lack of opportunities for the players to progress within the Pontypridd Town set-up and a desire to keep a football club representing Pontypridd in the town following Pontypridd Town's move to Cardiff (and later Aberdare).

The club currently (2024–25) plays in the Taff Ely Rhymney Valley League.

== Colours ==
The club wears the same black and white stripes as the previous club, albeit for 2024–25 in a narrower design.

== Ground ==
The club originally played at the Maritime Recreation Ground, a 3G pitch on the site of the former Pontypridd/Maritime Colliery. In 2020 they moved to Ynysangharad War Memorial Park.

The club currently plays all home matches at nearby Taff Vale Park, after a move in October 2025.

== League record ==
Season	Pyramid tier	League	Final position
2018-19	9	Taff Ely Rhymney Valley Football League Division One	6th
2021-22	7	Taff Ely Rhymney Valley Football League Premier Division	8th
2022-23	7	Taff Ely Rhymney Valley Football League Premier Division	11th
2023-24	7	Taff Ely Rhymney Valley Football League Premier Division	10th (relegated)
2024-25	8	Taff Ely Rhymney Valley Football League Division One	2nd (promoted)
