= 2019–20 Welsh Football League Division One =

Welsh Football League Division One
- Season: 2019–20
- Dates: 16 August 2019 – 4 April 2020
- Champions: Trefelin B.G.C.
- Promoted: Trefelin B.G.C., Port Talbot Town F.C. and Risca United F.C.

The Welsh Football League Division One 2019–20 season is the final season of this football league in South Wales. It is due to be replaced by the FAW League One for 2020–21. It is Tier 3 of the Welsh League Pyramid in South Wales.

After the season was cut short by the Coronavirus-19 pandemic the FAW confirmed its promotion and relegation decision on 16 June 2020.

The top 3 teams in the 2019–20 season have been promoted to the Cymru South. Which teams are due to make up the new FAW League One for the 2020–21 season are yet to be decided by the Football Association of Wales. A decision is expected in July 2020.

== Member clubs for the final 2019–20 season ==
Locations of teams in the 2019–20 Welsh Football League Division One season
- Aberbargoed Buds
- Abergavenny Town
- AFC Llwydcoed
- Bridgend Street
- Caldicot Town
- Croesyceiliog
- Dinas Powys
- Garden Village
- Goytre
- Monmouth Town
- Penydarren BGC
- Pontardawe Town
- Port Talbot Town
- Risca United
- Ton Pentre
- Trefelin BGC

=== League table ===
Pos	Team	Pld	W	D	L	GF	GA	GD	Pts	Promotion or relegation
1	Trefelin B.G.C. (P)	20	17	3	0	0	0	0	54	Promotion to Cymru South
2	Port Talbot Town F.C. (P)	18	10	5	3	0	0	0	35	Promotion to Cymru South
3	Risca United F.C. (P)	16	10	3	3	0	0	0	33	Promotion to Cymru South
4	Goytre A.F.C.	18	9	5	4	0	0	0	32	
5	Garden Village A.F.C.	20	8	5	7	0	0	0	29	
6	Caldicot Town F.C.	18	8	2	8	0	0	0	26	
7	Penydarren B.G.C.	13	7	3	3	0	0	0	24	
8	Ton Pentre F.C.	19	6	4	9	0	0	0	22	
9	Bridgend Street A.F.C.	15	6	3	6	0	0	0	21	
10	Pontardawe Town F.C.	16	5	4	7	0	0	0	19	
11	Abergavenny Town F.C.	20	5	3	12	0	0	0	18	
12	Aberbargoed Buds F.C.	15	4	4	7	0	0	0	16	
13	Monmouth Town F.C.	17	4	2	11	0	0	0	14	
14	A.F.C. Llwydcoed	16	3	5	8	0	0	0	14	
15	Croesyceiliog A.F.C.	13	3	4	6	0	0	0	13	
16	Dinas Powys F.C. (R)	18	2	3	13	0	0	0	9	Relegation to Tier 4

Updated to match(es) played on 7 March 2020. Source:
Rules for classification: 1) Points; 2) Goal difference; 3) Goals scored; 4) Matches won; 5) Play-off.
(P) Promoted; (R) Relegated
